= Boring (The Young Ones) =

- The Young Ones episode
- Episode no.: Series 1 Episode 3
- Directed by: Geoff Posner
- Written by: Ben Elton; Rik Mayall; Lise Mayer
- Original air date: 23 November 1982

Guest appearances
- Madness; Mark Arden; Jim Barclay; Ruth Burnett; Jacqueline Clarke; Paola Dionisotti; Nick Dunning; Stephen Frost; Paul Gale; Peter Greene

Episode chronology
← Previous "Oil"	Next → "Bomb"

"Boring" is the third episode of The Young Ones, a British sitcom. It was written by Ben Elton, Rik Mayall, and Lise Mayer, and directed by Paul Jackson. It was first aired on BBC2 on 23 November 1982.

This episode is rarely repeated uncut on television because of its racial content, including two uses of "coon", one use of "sambo", and one use of "nigger". All three words are spoken in a scene by a Caucasian policeman in sunglasses unaware that his interlocutor is white until he removes them, satirising the severe racial issues that affected the police at this time. When it is shown on television, it is edited to remove these references.

== Plot ==
The quartet are bored to exasperation, despite the fact that there are roller skating vegetables in the kitchen sink. Several other remarkable and unlikely phenomena occur around them throughout the episode, entirely unnoticed by the characters, as they attempt to find something to relieve their boredom. Even a televised siege parodying the 1980 Iranian Embassy Siege that spills into their living room goes unnoticed.

A visit to the local pub, where Vyvyan meets his long-lost mother, and Rick and Neil both reveal that they don't drink, fails to provide entertainment. Madness make an appearance at the pub, renamed the Kebab and Calculator, and perform their current hit at that time, "House of Fun". At one point Neil suggests they go to lectures, but the idea is met with incredulity by his housemates. The exterior shots of the pub scene were filmed at the Westbury Park Tavern in Henleaze, Bristol.

In reference to the story of Goldilocks and the Three Bears, Goldilocks rejects the lentils that Neil has prepared (she dismisses it as "bloody hippie food"), and the Three Bears also reject the lentils and opt to "go to McDonald's" instead.

As they drift off to sleep for another night, a spaceship lands on their roof, with Neil still obliviously sitting on his windowsill.

== Characters ==
As with all episodes of The Young Ones, the main four characters are student housemates Mike (Christopher Ryan), Vyvyan (Adrian Edmondson), Rick (Rik Mayall), and Neil (Nigel Planer). Alexei Sayle stars as Billy Balowski, an eccentric taxi driver and brother of the students' landlord Jerzei.

Mark Arden and Stephen Frost play a pair of rather stupid policemen who deliver a series of gags separately from the other characters. They are then revealed to be the subject of an article on the front of The Guardian with the headline "Police I.Q. Shocker".

Also in this episode is David Rappaport, playing Ftumch the devil. This is one of his two appearances in The Young Ones, the other being as a different character in Flood.

The episode also features a performance of "House of Fun" by the band Madness. In addition, lead singer Suggs has a line of dialogue in the episode. When Rick asks if the band knows "Summer Holiday" by Cliff Richard, Suggs replies, "You hum it, I'll smash your face in!"

Actress and writer Pauline Melville makes the first of two appearances as Vyvyan's mother (the other being "Sick").
