= Sick (The Young Ones) =

- The Young Ones episode
- Episode no.: Series 2 Episode 5
- Directed by: Paul Jackson
- Written by: Ben Elton, Rik Mayall and Lise Mayer
- Original air date: 12 June 1984
- Running time: 34:38

Guest appearances
- Featuring Madness With Mark Arden, Jim Barclay, Perry Benson, Ruth Burnett, Hugh Cecil, Jean Channon, Brian Croucher, Ben Elton, Stephen Frost, Peter Greene, Ceri Jackson, Kilian McKenna, Pauline Melville, Carla Mendonça, Michael Redfern, David Rolfe, Maggie Steed, and Brian Oulton and Peggy Thorpe-Bates.

Episode chronology
← Previous "Time"	Next → "Summer Holiday"

"Sick" is the eleventh episode of British sitcom The Young Ones. It was written by Ben Elton, Rik Mayall and Lise Mayer, and directed by Paul Jackson. It was first aired on BBC2 on 12 June 1984. The episode features the song "Our House", performed by Madness, the only band to appear on the show twice.

== Plot ==
All four flatmates have caught colds and are recuperating at their home, with all but Mike complaining and making nuisances of themselves in various ways. Neil develops a severe sneezing fit that causes large amounts of mucus to spew from his nose. Mike visits a local chemist's shop to get some medicine, but is thrown out by a female employee after trying to flirt with her. Neil's sneezes trigger a series of altercations on the street outside the house that grows into a block-wide riot; the band Madness are drawn into the chaos while performing their song "Our House". Meanwhile, Vyvyan tapes Rick's laundry bag over Neil's head to contain the mucus, and later tries to cure him through acupuncture by hammering nails into his head.

During the riot, a criminal named Brian Damage Balowski escapes police custody and takes the four hostage at their home, holding them at gunpoint. Brian Damage inadvertently cures Neil's sneezes by headbutting him so that he falls backward onto one of Vyvyan's nails. The group receive a brief visit from Vyvyan's mother, who proves to be as rude and uncouth as he is. Meanwhile, Neil suddenly remembers that his parents are coming to tea that afternoon. Upon their arrival, Neil's parents are concerned about their son's decision to star on The Young Ones. They suggest that the programme should be more age-appropriate in the manner of The Good Life. However, Vyvyan is outraged by this idea and angrily tears down the show's title card when it appears.

The scene abruptly changes to the backyard, loosely parodying The Good Life, with the four fully recovered and ineptly trying to start a garden. Irritated by Neil's constant talk about seeds and growing things, Rick knocks him out with a shovel blow to the head, and later buries him under a freshly delivered load of manure fertiliser for fear of having killed him. Triplicates of Neil rise from the pile that night. While Rick is asleep in his bed, he has a nightmare about being put on trial by Vyvyan and Mike for killing Neil. As a group of girls in the courtroom offer to strip naked for Rick, his conscience scolds him for ignoring his guilt over Neil's death. As Rick tearfully wishes that he would see Neil again, all three Neils enter the house, which terrifies Rick. Vyvyan and Mike join Rick and Neil in the living room, whereupon the back wall of the house opens up to reveal a variety show stage, on which Brian Damage and Neil's parents wave and blow kisses to the audience as the show's closing credits roll.

== Characters ==
Vyvyan (Adrian Edmondson), Rick (Rik Mayall), Neil (Nigel Planer), and Mike (Christopher Ryan). Alexei Sayle starred as escaped convict Brian Damage Balowski. Brian Oulton and Peggy Thorpe-Bates appear as Neil's parents, and Pauline Melville appears as Vyvyan's mother, a role she had previously played in "Boring".
