= Nasty (The Young Ones) =

- The Young Ones episode
- Episode no.: Series 2 Episode 3
- Directed by: Paul Jackson
- Written by: Ben Elton, Rik Mayall and Lise Mayer
- Original air date: 29 May 1984
- Running time: 34:56

Guest appearances
- Featuring The Damned With Mark Arden, Helen Atkinson Wood, Chris Barrie, Paul Bradley, Arnold Brown, Vikki Chambers, Ron Cook, Dawn French, Stephen Frost, Hale and Pace, Damaris Hayman, Daniel Peacock, Barry Stanton, Andy de la Tour, Peter Wear and Terry Jones

Episode chronology
← Previous "Cash"	Next → "Time"

"Nasty" is the ninth episode of British sitcom The Young Ones. It was written by Ben Elton, Rik Mayall and Lise Mayer, and directed by Paul Jackson. It was first aired on BBC2 on 29 May 1984.

== Plot ==
The episode begins with a man playing chess against Death. After losing to the man, Death declares "Bollocks to this!" and attacks the man with his scythe. The horror movie-themed opening credits are followed by Mike, Rick, Vyvyan and Neil carrying a coffin through a local cemetery. The coffin is brought to a freshly dug grave where a passing woman asks a spade-holding Neil if he digs graves, to which Neil replies, "Yeah, they're all right." After encountering a drunken vicar and two gravediggers, the episode then takes a flashback to events leading up to the burial. It is bath night, and while Neil jumps into the muddy bathwater used in the other threes' previous baths (inadvertently finding his long-lost bicycle in the process), Rick locks himself in his room and gets on his bed for a sneaky read of Cosmopolitan - only to nearly get cut in half by Vyvyan's cleverly placed circular saw. Mike and Vyvyan spend the time trying to set up the new video recorder they have secured, in order to watch a video nasty. A scene-stealing postman then arrives to deliver a human-shaped package from the Transvaal. After falling out of the bathroom window and having his bedroom boarded up, Neil arrives downstairs wearing a dress he found in Rick's room (with Rick's name tagged in the back). Neil briefly gets the video machine to work by plugging it in, suffering a sustained electric shock in the process, and the group is shown a commercial for a women's pain reliever set in Hell.

After the video stops working once again, the package delivered earlier has opened. This turns out to be a vampire, who claims he is really just a driving instructor from Johannesburg. The vampire chases the boys but stops to use the toilet. Locked in the toilet, the vampire's driving instructor ruse fails when he incorrectly answers Vyvyan's Highway Code question about what to do when crossing a humpback bridge. When the four realise that vampires only attack virgins, it leads to them all unconvincingly denying their sexual purity. But when the vampire returns downstairs, he is hit by sunlight streaming through the window (as he still has his wristwatch set to South African time) - and he is placed inside a dual-purpose sofa-coffin. The scene flashes forward back to the graveyard, where Mike realises it is 9:30. The vampire then comes out from the coffin and reveals himself to be Harry the Bastard, an employee from Rumbelows from whom they rented the video machine. Harry announces that their deadline for returning the machine has just elapsed and they now owe him £500 in late fees. As the closing line of the episode, the entire gang at the grave site turn to the camera and say, "Wow! What a complete bastard!" The closing credits play over Death and the man from the chess match (who is now a ghost) arguing at a golf hole.

== Characters ==
As with all episodes of The Young Ones, the main four characters were student housemates Mike (Christopher Ryan); Vyvyan (Adrian Edmondson); Rick (Rik Mayall) and Neil (Nigel Planer). Alexei Sayle starred as the South African vampire/driving instructor. Monty Python alumnus Terry Jones makes a cameo as a drunken vicar and comedy duo Hale & Pace appear as a pair of gravediggers that the lads tell their story to. Arnold Brown appears as the man in the opening scene playing chess against Death. Dawn French and Helen Atkinson-Wood appear in the pain reliever commercial set in Hell.
