= Bambi (The Young Ones) =

- The Young Ones episode
- Episode no.: Series 2 Episode 1
- Directed by: Paul Jackson
- Written by: Ben Elton; Rik Mayall; Lise Mayer
- Original air date: 8 May 1984
- Running time: 34:52

Guest appearances
- Motörhead; Robbie Coltrane as Dr. Carlisle; Hugh Laurie as Lord Monty; Stephen Fry as Lord Snot; Ben Elton as Kendal Mintcake; Emma Thompson as Miss Money Sterling; Tony Robinson as Dr. Not the Nine O'Clock News; Griff Rhys Jones as Bambi Gascoigne; Mel Smith as Security Guard; Tamsin Heatley

Episode chronology
← Previous "Flood"	Next → "Cash"

"Bambi" is the seventh episode of British sitcom The Young Ones. It was written by Ben Elton, Rik Mayall and Lise Mayer, and directed by Paul Jackson. It was broadcast on BBC2 on 8 May 1984, as the first episode of the show's second series. It parodies University Challenge. This scene also showcased the two emerging sides of British comedy at the time: The Young Ones, representative of the new British 'Punk' Alternative Comedy scene, against comedians who represented the new "Oxbridge" Comedy Scene.

== Plot ==
An upset Neil bursts into the house, interrupting a story Rick is telling an uninterested Vyvyan and Mike, and describes an encounter in which a complete stranger called him smelly. Mike realises that none of the four has washed any laundry since October 1981. One of Vyvyan's dirty socks comes to life and tries to escape the house; after they destroy it, Mike insists that they visit the local launderette immediately, but Vyvyan reminds him that they have to wait until it opens the next morning.

After a night's sleep, the four rush downstairs and set out for the launderette, only to find that none of the washing machines will accept their clothing. Vyvyan tricks one machine into opening its door so he can stuff in the load, but the four then discover that they have neither any laundry detergent nor the coins needed to operate the machine. Once they return to their house, Neil suddenly remembers that they have been invited to represent Scumbag College on University Challenge that evening. Still wearing their dirty clothes, they rush to catch a train as Motörhead perform their song "Ace of Spades" in the living room.

During the train ride, Neil frantically studies some of Rick's old class notes, Rick complains about disparaging comments written in them by his classmates, and Vyvyan has Neil quiz him from a book of bizarre trivia and world records. Ignoring posted warning signs, Vyvyan puts his head out the window and accidentally decapitates himself when the train enters a tunnel. He stops the train to chase down his head, while the other three are subsequently thrown off after impatiently Rick insults the conductor. The four hitchhike to the studio and arrive two weeks later, bedraggled and filthy, and Vyvyan tries and fails to smuggle in a pig. Mike's friend, Bambi, is the host of University Challenge (and a play on host Bamber Gascoigne). He is now walking on two legs, exactly resembling a human, and he declines Rick's request to let Scumbag win.

Scumbag is pitted against the incredibly wealthy Footlights College team from Oxbridge, to whom Bambi shows blatant favouritism by accepting wrong answers and bribes. The teams are arranged physically one above the other, in a parody of the show's split-screen format. The match is complicated by Neil's desperate need to use a toilet. Enraged at not receiving easier questions, Vyvyan kicks the head of the Footlights team member above whom he is sitting, then blows up the entire team with a German stick grenade. The questions become much easier, with Vyvyan recognising them as being from his book of trivia, but Mike and Neil beat him to the buzzer every time. A trick question fools Rick into admitting that he cheated by swapping the question cards, causing the audience to boo and throw things at Scumbag. They are suddenly squashed by a giant éclair, which belongs to a medical doctor who has been observing the events of the episode as a bacterial culture under his microscope. The episode ends when the doctor later feeds it to an elephant, Jumbo, who is supposedly a horribly disfigured man.

== Cast ==
As with all episodes of The Young Ones, the main four characters were student housemates Mike (Christopher Ryan); Vyvyan (Adrian Edmondson); Rick (Rik Mayall); and Neil (Nigel Planer). The title character was portrayed by Griff Rhys Jones in a parody of real-life University Challenge presenter Bamber Gascoigne, while Jones' comedy partner Mel Smith has a cameo as a security guard. The opposing University Challenge team, from (the fictional) Footlights College, Oxbridge, comprises Lord Monty (Hugh Laurie); Lord Snot (Stephen Fry: who had himself appeared on University Challenge while a Cambridge student); Miss Money-Sterling (Emma Thompson); and Kendal Mintcake (Ben Elton). Alexei Sayle appears briefly as a train driver to deliver his trademark monologue (in this case to a lone Mexican bandido). Robbie Coltrane portrays Dr Carlisle, who has been observing the episode under a microscope. Tony Robinson portrays Dr Not-The-Nine-O'Clock-News, who brings in the elephant. The episode's musical guests, the heavy metal group Motörhead, perform their 1980 single "Ace of Spades". This was the first appearance with newly joined guitarists Würzel and Phil Campbell, and the last with drummer Phil "Philthy Animal" Taylor in his original stint.

== Reception ==
Writing for The Times in 1984, Peter Lee said the broadcast of this episode ought to cause "great rejoicing".

Writing for The Guardian in 2013, Alexei Sayle claimed that "Bambi" had a detrimental effect on the UK alternative comedy scene of the 1980s, as the guest stars were prominent members of the established Cambridge Footlights, in direct contrast to Sayle's Marxist leanings. Sayle refused to appear with the guests or the regular cast, delivering a taped monologue instead.
