= Time (The Young Ones) =

- The Young Ones episode
- Episode no.: Series 2 Episode 4
- Directed by: Paul Jackson
- Written by: Ben Elton, Rik Mayall and Lise Mayer
- Original air date: 5 June 1984
- Running time: 34:09

Guest appearances
- Featuring Amazulu With Gary Beadle, Jonathan Caplan, Robbie Coltrane, Lee Cornes, Dawn French, Gareth Hale, Helen Lederer, Paul Martin, Norman Pace, Jennifer Saunders, Julianne White

Episode chronology
← Previous "Nasty"	Next → "Sick"

"Time" is the tenth episode of British sitcom The Young Ones. It was written by Ben Elton, Rik Mayall and Lise Mayer, and directed by Paul Jackson. It was first aired on BBC2 on 5 June 1984.

== Plot ==
The episode begins with opening credits and setting which parodies the popular American soap opera Dallas. As a greedy owner of a fictional Texas oil company, Neil signs over oil wells and gives away $6 billion to the entire public. However, this philanthropy initially disappoints Rick, who portrays an American client and concurs with Neil's altruism.

Meanwhile, Neil is woken from this beautiful dream by Vyvyan, who angrily yells to the Sunday bellringers outside to be quiet while he is suffering a hangover from his mixed drinks, when he and the housemates had a wild party in their flat last Saturday night. Rick wakes up next to an unknown young woman, fully clothed. His initial shock and confusion is tempered by his realisation that he can boast about a sexual conquest to the others. But His housemates are sceptical, Vyvyan is repulsed by the notion of a woman fancying Rick and is also jealous. Neil wants details, which Rick barely manages to make up. Mike is offended as he is "supposed to be the one who gets the girls". Mike attempts to seduce the girl in question, who calls herself Helen Mucus. When she reveals that she merely fell sleep in an empty bed and she never knew that Rick was in it when she sneaked into his room during the night, the others turn on Rick, with Vyvyan delightfully accusing him of still being a virgin, sparking hefty denials from Rick. This argument escalates into an increasingly violent confrontation between Vyvyan and Rick, which spreads around the house.

Meanwhile, the radio reveals Helen is an escaped murderer, so she plans to kill the four who are too oblivious to know her true identity, beginning with Mike. He mistakes her violence as rough foreplay. The appearance of a medieval knight sends the front door crashing on top of Helen. This confuses the quartet, who soon discover the house has somehow gone through a time warp. Neil is concussed and kidnapped, along with Helen, by the knight who offers them as maidens to some Middle Ages hut keepers. Having been thrown off the knight's horse, Neil regains consciousness and starts a conversation with the villagers, but their hut blows up from a howitzer, poorly aimed by Vyvyan at Rick.

Neil is chased back to the house after being accused of sorcery, and, with Rick promising to have a T-shirt confirming his virginity printed, the four quickly check the television to see if programming has been altered by their time loop. They watch a fictional programme Medieval Torture Hour. Rick, Neil, and Mike panic about the time warp, asking what they are going to do, to which Vyvyan responds: "Oh, who cares?", which begins when the closing credit roll. During the credits, the boys settle down to a game of cards, while around them, all of the episode's characters enter the house. As a stinger, Neil gets hit on the head with a giant bone by one of the peasants, which only seems to annoy Neil.

== Characters ==
As with all episodes of The Young Ones, the main four characters were student housemates Mike (Christopher Ryan); Vyvyan (Adrian Edmondson); Rick (Rik Mayall) and Neil (Nigel Planer). Alexei Sayle starred as a medieval jester and a cheese shop customer. Jennifer Saunders plays the murderess Helen Mucus, while Helen Lederer plays the female sidekick of the jester's show and Robbie Coltrane portrays a one-eyed pirate radio DJ Captain Blood. Hale and Pace play peasants. This episode also features Paul Merton (credited under his real name, Paul Martin) as one of three yokels. It was his first television appearance. Dawn French also appears briefly as the Easter Bunny.

== Music ==
The episode features a performance by pop/reggae band Amazulu.

The Dallas parody title sequence utilises music from the closing credits of the unbroadcast original pilot edit of the first episode of The Young Ones, "Demolition."
