= Oil (The Young Ones) =

- The Young Ones episode
- Episode no.: Series 1 Episode 2
- Directed by: Paul Jackson
- Written by: Ben Elton, Rik Mayall and Lise Mayer
- Original air date: 16 November 1982

Guest appearances
- Ronnie Golden, Radical Posture

Episode chronology
← Previous "Demolition"	Next → "Boring"

"Oil" is the second episode of British sitcom The Young Ones. It was written by Ben Elton, Rik Mayall and Lise Mayer, and directed by Paul Jackson. It was first aired on BBC2 on 16 November 1982.

== Plot ==
The guys settle into their new house after the destruction of their previous abode in the show's pilot episode and allocate the bedrooms. As Rick and Vyvyan argue over one bedroom, Mike discovers Buddy Holly (Ronnie Golden) in his, having survived the plane crash on The Day the Music Died by parachuting out and smashing through the roof. He is still tangled in the parachute and hanging upside down from the ceiling, and he proceeds to sing Mike a song about the diet of insects on which he has subsisted since that day in 1959. Mike dreams of getting rich off the song, but his plan ends abruptly when Holly falls loose and hits the floor, breaking his neck. Dragging the body into the cellar, Mike discovers two elderly men lying on their backs under a bare light bulb and hallucinating that they are adrift at sea. Rick and Vyvyan give the room they have been arguing over to Neil after Vyvyan sets its bed on fire, and Mike briefly converts Rick's room into a roller disco and charges him admission to enter.

After a solo match of Murder in the Dark, Vyvyan announces that he has struck oil in the cellar, and instantly forms a coalition with Mike (whom Vyvyan calls "El Presidente") to extract and sell it. They decide to use Rick and Neil as slave labor, with Vyvyan enforcing discipline by beating the two with a cricket bat as they lie on the floor. After Neil inadvertently impales Vyvyan through the head with a pickaxe while digging for the oil, Rick tries to start a workers' revolution and organises a benefit concert in the house. The effort fails, though, as the band (fronted by Alexei Sayle in his Balowski persona) demands a large fee and Rick has not bothered to sell any tickets.

As Rick, Vyvyan and Neil are digging for oil in the cellar. The ACTUAL song playing on Rick's radio was an obscure song from 1973 called 'I'm Bustin' My Rocks (Working On The Chain Gang)' by Roy C, who was better known for his 1966 one-hit wonder, Shotgun Wedding, which was re-issued in 1972. The aforementioned song featured on a Roy C album from 1973 called 'Sex & Soul.'

During the end credits, a disoriented but conscious Vyvyan stumbles around the cellar, swinging a pickaxe at random. He ends by addressing the camera, saying that he lied about finding oil.

The episode featured a performance of "Doctor Martens' Boots" by the fictional electronic band Radical Posture, with Sayle on lead vocals.

Voice overdubs were added to the opening scene of this episode replacing original lines on DVD reissues of the series.

== Characters ==
As with all episodes of The Young Ones, the main four characters were student flatmates Mike (Christopher Ryan); Vyvyan (Adrian Edmondson); Rick (Rik Mayall) and Neil (Nigel Planer). Alexei Sayle appeared as Alexei Balowski, a protest singer and nephew of the students' landlord Jerzei.
