= Summer Holiday (The Young Ones) =

- The Young Ones episode
- Episode no.: Series 2 Episode 6
- Directed by: Paul Jackson; Ed Bye
- Written by: Ben Elton, Rik Mayall, and Lise Mayer
- Original air date: 19 June 1984

Guest appearances
- Featuring John Otway With Brian Croucher, Ben Elton, Alan Freeman, Stephen Frost, Lenny Henry, Jools Holland, Mark Lambert, Peter Laxton, Helen Lederer, Norman Lovett, Lise Mayer, Joanne Pearce, Roger Sloman.

Episode chronology
← Previous "Sick"	Next → —

"Summer Holiday" is the twelfth and final episode of the British sitcom The Young Ones. It was written by Ben Elton, Rik Mayall, and Lise Mayer, and directed by Paul Jackson and Ed Bye. It was first aired on BBC2 on 19 June 1984.

== Plot ==
Outside shot of the victimised bank

The quartet have taken their final exams and are enjoying the summer, with Rick, Mike and Vyvyan out in the garden. Neil enters the garden looking mortified after the exams ordeal, only for Neil to be called a "killjoy" by Rick. After the insults, Neil transforms into a parody of the Incredible Hulk, thrashing his roommates around the garden, only for it to be revealed that Neil was having a daydream and was standing there with his clothes all torn and ripped. With Neil wanting to go to his room for a lie down, a family have somehow moved inside. When Neil questions why they were there, the husband throws him out.

Although Vyvyan is bored and begins to want violence and destruction, first by clocking Neil and then Rick in the head with a cricket bat. Rick suggests Botticelli to relieve the boredom, but his playing style proves too tedious and Mike and Vyvyan are not very bright at knowing how to play the game properly, So Vyvyan proposes playing cricket instead. In the living room, Rick is given the role of stumps and Vyvyan is bowler to Mike's batsman. The first shot knocks out Neil as he enters the room; the second involves Vyvyan not releasing the ball and running straight for Rick, clouting him on the head. Mike suggests that Vyvyan obtain The Ashes for winning, which he promptly tries to do by setting Rick on fire. Neil reveals it is his birthday, much to the indifference of the others. The four decide to watch the television, but the channels are all closing down, infuriating Vyvyan, who kicks the television to pieces. Rick then learns of his parents' sudden and possibly suicidal death from Mike, who thought it unimportant to mention earlier.

Jerzei Balowski arrives to check on the house and its belongings. However, Jerzei evicts the four from the house after discovering several destroyed items. Jerzei then tries to rent the home to new tenants, only for God to call his bluff and literally strike him dead after Jerzei falsely claims that the flat is "great" and "the wackiest house on television". The next morning, the four are seen living homeless on the streets as John Otway performs his song "Body Talk", provoking Vyvyan to comment: "I'll bloody well make his body talk in a minute!". The four later receive their exam results from the postman, who has already read the letters and tells Rick that he "came bottom in the whole world", followed by Vyvyan, Mike, and Neil coming top out of the four.

Mike then hatches a plan to rob a bank, using water pistols and Vyvyan's Ford Anglia as their getaway vehicle. They mess up their own robbery, but unwittingly take the proceeds from a separate ongoing one, and escape to Vyvyan's car, which he had parked in front of a lamppost. Vyvyan promptly crashes it into the lamppost. Inconsolable at crashing his car, he also reveals that his hamster SPG has died, as he was sleeping on the car's radiator when the car crashed. With the police sirens in the distance, Rick leaves to find a new getaway vehicle, and returns with an AEC Routemaster double-decker bus, which they drive away to freedom. As they sing songs and plan for their future, Rick suddenly shouts: "Look out, Cliff!", as the bus crashes into a Cliff Richard concert billboard and then immediately plunges over a cliff on the other side. As the series comes to an end, the bus lands at the bottom of a quarry, and there is a pause until the lads saying their final words: "Phew, that was close!", which is followed by the bus exploding into flames during the closing credits.

== Characters ==
Mike (Christopher Ryan); Vyvyan (Adrian Edmondson); Rick (Rik Mayall) and Neil (Nigel Planer). The episode also features their landlord Jerzei Balowski (Alexei Sayle) for his only time during the second series, and for the third time in total. No explanation is given for how he survived being locked in Mike's room with man eating lions or reverted from being a homicidal axe-wielding maniac.

A postman is played by Lenny Henry, while Jools Holland and Norman Lovett cameo as bank customers. Stephen Frost also makes an appearance, playing the bank manager, while Helen Lederer appears as a bank clerk. DJ Alan Freeman plays God while sitting at a radio mixing desk, for the second time in the series.
