= Flood (The Young Ones) =

- The Young Ones episode
- Episode no.: Series 1 Episode 6
- Directed by: Paul Jackson
- Written by: Ben Elton, Rik Mayall and Lise Mayer
- Original air date: 14 December 1982

Episode chronology
← Previous "Interesting"	Next → "Bambi"

"Flood" is the sixth episode of British sitcom The Young Ones. It was written by Ben Elton, Rik Mayall and Lise Mayer, and directed by Paul Jackson. It was first aired on BBC2 on 14 December 1982 and was the final episode of the first series.

This episode was the only one of the dozen made not to feature a band performing mid-show; the lion-tamer provided the "cabaret" instead.

== Plot ==
With none of the quartet noticing a medieval execution in their back garden, there is initial tranquility in the house, with Neil randomly hitting himself in the face with a frying pan, and Vyvyan reading one of Rick's "SS Death Camp Criminal Battalion go to Monte Cassino for the Massacre" war comics, leading to an argument with Rick over the comic's content. Before Neil prepares to go on a shopping trip for "everything except Green Globules and Super Mousse", Vyvyan mentions that he had concocted a 'axe-wielding homicidal maniac' potion disguised in a Coca-Cola can, that transforms the drinker into said person, under the guise of a "cure for not being a axe-wielding homicidal maniac", to which Vyvyan mentions the enormous potential market for such an invention.

Torrential rain soon traps everyone in the house and a game of hide and seek gets underway to pass the time. The house takes on a Narnia-esque feel, with a lion tamer in Mike's bedroom and Vyvyan finding a witch in a sleigh lurking in a new world at the back of the wardrobe where he was hiding. But all that - plus the sharks at the window and the arson attack on Rick's bedroom caused by Vyvyan - becomes irrelevant as Mr. Balowski arrives, unwittingly drinks Vyvyan's potion, and goes on the hunt. As Mike, Rick and Vyvyan prepare to kill Neil for food with an electric hedge trimmer, Mr. Balowski breaks down the door to Neil's room with an axe, leading to the group trying to escape him. After tricking Mr. Balowski into entering Mike's room, which was being rented out to Bobby the Lion Tamer and his man-eating lions, (Bobby coincidentally was Robert Raven from Gerry Cottles Circus), the group notice the floodwaters are subsiding. The episode ends by showing Vyvyan's hamster, SPG, floating on a discarded McEwan's Export can on the floodwaters, showing he had survived Vyvyan's angry outburst which led to him throwing him outside. A rainbow can be seen on the horizon and SPG is carrying an olive branch in his mouth.

== Characters ==
As with all episodes of The Young Ones, the main four characters were student housemates Mike (Christopher Ryan); Vyvyan (Adrian Edmondson); Rick (Rik Mayall) and Neil (Nigel Planer). The episode also features their landlord Jerzei Balowski (Alexei Sayle), a character who was appearing for the second time during the first series, and would appear once more in total.

The cat puppet in this episode was voiced by writer Ben Elton.
