= Demolition (The Young Ones) =

- The Young Ones episode
- Episode no.: Series 1 Episode 1
- Directed by: Paul Jackson
- Written by: Ben Elton, Rik Mayall and Lise Mayer
- Original air date: 9 November 1982

Guest appearance
- Nine Below Zero

Episode chronology
← Previous —	Next → "Oil"

"Demolition" is the pilot episode for British sitcom The Young Ones. It was written by Ben Elton, Rik Mayall and Lise Mayer, and it was directed by Paul Jackson. Although made as a pilot episode, the five subsequent episodes had been commissioned and recorded by the time of broadcast, so "Demolition" was promoted to the ordinary first episode of a series and has remained as so. It was first aired on BBC2 on 9 November 1982.

== Plot ==
Four dissimilar male students studying at the fictional Scumbag College go about their day-to-day life, sharing rooms in a squalid house. Neil cooks a lentil casserole from South African lentils, that no one wants to eat, then becomes so depressed that he attempts suicide twice. He first tries to suffocate himself in a gas-filled oven but stops upon seeing how filthy it is; next he tries to hang himself, only to find that he has left too much slack in the rope. Vyvyan brings home an amputated human leg from the college morgue, planning to mount it on the bonnet of his car instead of writing an essay about it for anatomy class. Rick, who becomes extremely agitated whenever he perceives any slight against Cliff Richard, begins smashing saucers and uses Neil's guitar to attack a pair of joke-telling rats. Jerzei Balowski, the group's landlord, visits to ask that they pay the rent they owe, but Mike distracts him until he agrees to settle accounts with them later.

Vyvyan announces that the four have received a letter from the council informing them that their house is to be demolished the next day, and each one devises his own plan to fight the decision. Vyvyan tries to destroy the house himself; Neil considers hiding inside a wall cavity, then places his head in the path of a workman's sledgehammer; and Mike tries to seduce a female council representative who needs to see their rent book. Meanwhile, Rick ties himself to a large cross in front of the house and begins to read a protest poem he has written, but switches to singing a snippet from Richard's song "Living Doll" after he drops his notebook. None of their strategies is successful in deterring the council, but the demolition order becomes moot when an airplane suddenly exploded somehow, then crashes into the house and destroys it with everybody in the way.

== Characters ==
As with all episodes of The Young Ones, the main four characters were student housemates Mike (Christopher Ryan); Vyvyan (Adrian Edmondson); Rick (Rik Mayall) and Neil (Nigel Planer). However, there are several telltale signs of this being the pilot episode; the characters' individual personalities are not as fleshed out as in later episodes, Rick's outfit is different, and he and Vyvyan sport shorter haircuts. The episode also introduces their landlord Jerzei Balowski (Alexei Sayle), a character who would only appear once more during the first series and twice more in total. Sayle, however, featured in every episode of the dozen made, often as other members of the Balowski family. Ben Elton appears as the host of a teenager-oriented BBC2 show called Nozin' Aroun'; Rick kicks in the television screen upon watching it, ridiculing the on-air personnel's "hippie" traits and preference for flared trousers.

== Music ==
The opening theme music is an arrangement of the 1961 song "The Young Ones", performed by the cast. This recording was used for the opening of all six episodes of series one and four of the six episodes of series two.

The musical interlude for this episode was provided by the band Nine Below Zero, performing "11 + 11."

The original edit of the episode featured an arrangement by Peter Brewis of "The Young Ones" title song that was ultimately unused, although the music was reconfigured into the opening music of the second series episode "Time." The broadcast version of the episode features closing theme music by Brewis that would be used for most of the series' episodes.
