= Bomb (The Young Ones) =

- The Young Ones episode
- Episode no.: Series 1 Episode 4
- Directed by: Geoff Posner
- Written by: Ben Elton, Rik Mayall and Lise Mayer
- Original air date: 30 November 1982

Guest appearance
- Dexys Midnight Runners

Episode chronology
| ← Previous "Boring" | Next → "Interesting" |

"Bomb" is the fourth episode of British sitcom The Young Ones. It was written by Ben Elton, Rik Mayall and Lise Mayer, and directed by Paul Jackson. It was first aired on BBC2 on 30 November 1982. The episode notably satirises the then-current anxieties of a potential nuclear war, and features references to the Protect and Survive public information pamphlets.

== Plot ==
The episode opens with footage of a US Air Force B-1 Lancer bomber dropping a payload, revealed to be a huge red atom bomb that lands in the quartet's house but didn't detonate. Neil fails to notice the real reason for an enormous hole in the ceiling when he gets out of bed to make the breakfast, assuming that one of his flatmates had put it there somehow. Eventually Vyvyan points out that the atom bomb is perched against the refrigerator, which he noticed when he couldn't get the milk out of it earlier. The initial panic is diverted by the arrival of a sadistic television licence officer who wants blood because they haven't got licence for the telly, And Vyvyan eat the whole thing before the officer get a chance to nicked them, but soon the quartet returns to the emergency at hand.

Mike tries negotiating with Libya and other nations and organizations to make a profit out of the bomb, while Rick uses the bomb in an attempt to make threats to the British government (his efforts at sending a threatening telegram through the Post Office fail when he mistakenly walks into the DHSS after trying to call Margaret Thatcher on the telephone at home; he erroneously believes she has 400 different phone numbers in the telephone directory. However, Mike is using the phone, so Rick goes to the telephone box to find that a group of insane elderly women are destroying it). Neil, ever the pragmatist, sets out his personal survival plan: "I'm going to consult the incredibly helpful Protect and Survive manual!", and Vyvyan tries to speed up the detonation procedure. The final tick of the clock prior to the "explosion" proves to be a little disappointing, with the bomb hatching like an egg and a small aeroplane bursting out of it, flying out of the room, and circling outside the house (thus implying the bomb was merely an "egg" of the bomber).

== Characters ==
As with all episodes of The Young Ones, the main four characters were student housemates Mike (Christopher Ryan), Vyvyan (Adrian Edmondson), Rick (Rik Mayall) and Neil (Nigel Planer). Mayall and Planer also appear as two wisecracking golfers who sing before a studio audience. Alexei Sayle starred as Reggie Balowski, a wisecracking used car dealer and son of the students' landlord, Jerzei. Roger Sloman appeared as the television license officer named "Right Bleedin' Bastard."
