= Paola Dionisotti =

Italian-British actress (born 1946)

Paola Dionisotti (Italian pronunciation: [ˈpaːola di.oniˈzɔtti, - djo-]; born 1946 in Turin) is an Italian-British actress active on stage and British television since 1975.

== Early life ==
Dionisotti is the daughter of Italian literary critic Carlo Dionisotti and Marisa Pinna Pintor. She has two sisters: Anna Carlotta, a Latinist at the King's College London, and Eugenia, a librarian.

== Career ==
A character actress best known on television for recurring roles as Lady Patricia Broughall in Forever Green and Aunt Nicholls in Harbour Lights, Dionisotti also has had prominent roles in Miss Marple and Midsomer Murders. She is also known for playing Lady Waynwood in the HBO fantasy series Game of Thrones. On the stage, she is noted for her Shakespearean roles. She starred in Michael Bogdanov's 1978 Royal Shakespeare Company production of The Taming of the Shrew at the Aldwych. In 2014, she played the tavern landlady Mistress Quickly in the RSC production of Henry IV Parts One and Two.

== Partial filmography ==
Year	Title	Role
1978	The Sailor's Return	Lucy Sturmey
1982	The Young Ones: "Boring"	Queen
1982	The Young Ones: "Bomb"	DHSS Official
1983	Fords on Water	Eddie's Mother
1984	Agatha Christie's Miss Marple: "A Murder is Announced"	Miss Hinchcliffe
1998	The Tichborne Claimant	The Dowager
1998	Vigo	Marie
2000	Come and Go	Flo
2001	Intimacy	Amanda
2004	Love's Brother	Nonna
2009	Midsomer Murders: "The Great and the Good"	Mrs Stroud
2010	Doctors: "Careless Whisper"	Tricia Andrews
2010	Agatha Christie's Poirot: "Hallowe'en Party"	Mrs Goodbody
2010	My Mother's Coat	Narrator
2012	Cheerful Weather for the Wedding	Mrs Whitstable
2014	Game of Thrones: "The Mountain and the Viper"	Anya Waynwood
2016	Florence Foster Jenkins	Baroness Le Feyre

== Awards ==
- 2000: London Evening Standard Theatre Award for Best Actress for Further Than The Furthest Thing at the Royal National Theatre
