= Andy de la Tour =

English actor and screenwriter

- Born: 1948 (age 77–78); Colchester, England
- Occupations: Actor; screenwriter

Andy de la Tour (born 1948) is an English actor and screenwriter.

De la Tour has appeared in the films Plenty, Notting Hill, Roman Polanski's Oliver Twist, 44 Inch Chest, The Confessions and Rogue One: A Star Wars Story, and on the television series The Young Ones, Filthy Rich & Catflap, Bottom, Kavanagh QC and The Brief. On stage, he has appeared at the National Theatre in Harold Pinter's No Man's Land in 2001 and Alan Bennett's People in 2012. His credits as a television writer include Boon, Lovejoy, Peak Practice, The Vet, Kavanagh QC and Clem. He wrote the stage play Safe In Our Hands (winner of the LWT Plays on Stage Award).

As a stand-up comedian, he appeared in the 1980s with Rik Mayall, Ben Elton and French and Saunders. In 2012, he wrote Stand-Up or Die about his time as a stand-up comedian in New York. He appeared as George Porter in episode 13 of series 31 of Casualty "Not in Holby Anymore". On 6 June 2018 he appeared as Ted, an aging mechanic with a heart defect in BBC1's lunchtime soap Doctors.

== Personal life ==
Andy de la Tour is the brother of actress Frances de la Tour and partner of actress Susan Wooldridge.

The University of Kent holds an archive of material from de la Tour's career as part of the British Stand-Up Comedy Archive. The archive includes audiovisual recordings, promotional material, and photographs.

On 27 January 2019, he signed an open letter in The Guardian expressing opposition to the USA's handling of the political situation in Venezuela and calling for more dialogue with the president, Nicolás Maduro. In September 2025, he signed an open pledge with Film Workers for Palestine pledging not to work with Israeli film institutions "that are implicated in genocide and apartheid against the Palestinian people."

== Filmography ==
=== Film ===
Year	Title	Role	Notes
1981	Burning an Illusion	Foreman	
1983	Loose Connections	Journalist	
1983	Positions of Power	Doctor	Short film
1985	The Bride	Priest	
1985	Plenty	Randall	
1999	Notting Hill	Journalist	
1999	Captain Jack	Chandler	
2000	Pandaemonium	Andrew Crosse	
2005	Asylum	Inspector Easton	
2005	Oliver Twist	Workhouse Master	
2009	44 Inch Chest	Biggy Walpole	
2013	National Theatre Live: People	The Bishop	
2014	Don't Miss the Cup	Mr. Fitzgerald	Short film
2015	Dough	Saul Goodwyn	
2016	The Confessions	Ministro britannico	
2016	Rogue One	Hurst Romodi	

=== Television ===
Year	Title	Role	Notes
1980	Flickers	Clive	3 episodes
1980	Strangers	Gabriel	Episode: "Retribution"
1980	Juliet Bravo	Murderer	Episode: "The One That Got Away"
1982–84	The Young Ones	Pilot/Man on TV/Prisoner on Ship	3 episodes: "Demolition", "Cash", "Nasty"
1983	Bergerac	Moberley	Episode: "Prime Target"
1983	Grange Hill	Mr. Raynsford	Episode 6.12
1983	Nelly's Version	Station Porter	Television film
1984	Driving Ambition	Maxwell	Episode: "Manifold Depression"
1985	Happy Families	General	Episode: "Cassie"
1987	Filthy Rich and Catflap	Nightclub Impresario	Episode 1.5
1987	A Perfect Spy	Muspole	3 episodes
1988	King and Castle	Leonard Jenkins	Episode: "Kicks"
1988, 2016	Casualty	Bill Potter/George Porter	Episodes: "Caring", "Not in Holby Anymore"
1989	ScreenPlay	Valet	Episode: "The Act"
1990–94	Ben Elton: The Man from Auntie	Various	4 episodes
1990	Making News	Studio Director	Episode: "The Border Limo"
1991	The Men's Room	Nick	Episode 1.1
1992	Bottom	Chief Inspector Grobbelaar	Episode: "Parade"
1992	Downtown Lagos	Detective Sergeant Sheaf	2 episodes
1992	Witchcraft	Milk Float Driver	Episode 1.2
1994	The Wimbledon Poisoner	Graham Beamish	2 episodes
1998	Kavanagh QC	Michael Chlodini	Episode: "Dead Reckoning"
1999	The Scarlet Pimpernel	Marquis de St. Cyr	Episode: "The Scarlet Pimpernel"
2003	A Touch of Frost	Oscar Manning	Episode: "Close Encounters"
2004	Nighty Night	Mr. Brone	Episode 1.5
2005	The Quartermass Experiment	Chemist	Television film
2005	The Brief	Malcolm Tebbott	3 episodes
2007	The Bill	Geoffrey Gant	Episode: "Better Off Dead"
2011	Waking the Dead	Doug Symes	Episode: "Waterloo: Part 1"
2012, 2014	Holby City	Rod Evans/Roger Sullivan	Episodes: "When the Hangover Strikes", "Crush"
2013, 2018	Doctors	Martin Askey/Ted Castle	Episodes: "Floss", "Know When to Fold"
2017	Victoria	Flitch	Episode: "Comfort and Joy"
2019	Good Omens	Norman Weathered	Episode: "The Book"
2022	Blood, Sex & Royalty	Uncle Norfolk	Episode: "Somebody Wants Me Dead"
2022	Strike	Nico "Mucky" Ricci	2 episodes
2023	Star Wars: The Bad Batch	Hurst Romodi	Voice-over; episode: "The Summit"
