= Roger Sloman =

English actor

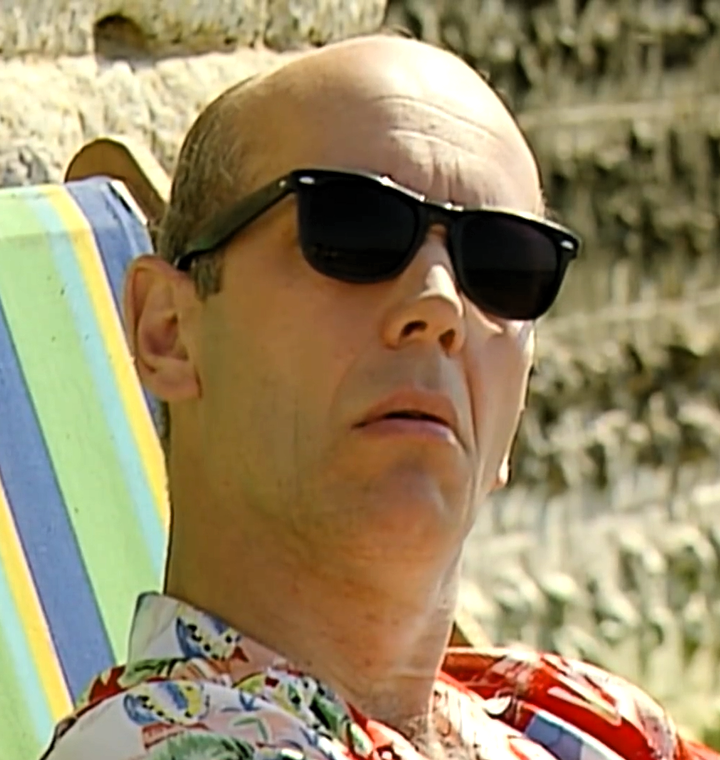
- Sloman in "Mr. Bean" (1990)
- Born: 19 May 1946 (age 80); Harlesden, Middlesex, England
- Occupation: Actor
- Television: Nuts in May (1976); A Kick Up the Eighties (1981–1984); EastEnders (1992, 2012, 2014–2016); Crossroads (2001–2003)
- Spouse: Cheryl Aldrige (m. 1980)
- Children: 3

Roger Sloman (born 19 May 1946) is an English actor.

== Early life and education ==
Sloman grew up and was educated in South East London. He trained to be a teacher and then went to East 15 acting school between 1967 and 1970.

== Career ==
He started work at the Everyman Theatre in Liverpool, followed by theatre work in Nottingham, Birmingham and Sheffield. He toured England and Scotland with the 7:84 theatre company and the Royal Shakespeare Company.

On television, Sloman is best known as Keith in Mike Leigh's Nuts in May, as well as Baldy Davitt in Ripping Yarns, Three-Fingered Pete in The Black Adder and Right Bleedin' Bastard in The Young Ones. He was Rocky Wesson in the return series of the ITV soap opera Crossroads, and the funeral director Les Coker in the BBC soap opera EastEnders. He played the abrasive games teacher Mr Dan 'Frosty' Foster in the first series of Grange Hill (1978) and he appeared in one edition of Bad Boyes (1987). In 1989, he appeared in the first episode of Press Gang as Mr. Vader. In 1991 and 1992, he played the landlord "Mr Harrison" opposite Rik Mayall and Adrian Edmondson in the Bottom episodes "Up" and "Holy". He also worked in educational television.

His film appearances include Lenin in Reds, by Warren Beatty.

Sloman has worked many times at the National Theatre in London playing, amongst others, Bardolph in Henry IV. He also appeared as Magwitch in Great Expectations at the Royal Shakespeare Company in Stratford-upon-Avon.

== Filmography ==
=== Film ===
Year	Title	Role	Notes
1981	The Monster Club	Club Secretary	
1981	Priest of Love	English Reporter	
1981	Reds	Vladimir Lenin	
1982	Captain Stirrick	Lord Kensington	
1988	Hawks	Car Park Attendant	
1992	B & B	Bob Noakes	
1992	Blue Ice	Shipping Clerk	
1996	The Cold Light of Day	Ludek Dittmayer	
1996	Loch Ness	Norwegian	
1999	Beowulf	Karl	
1999	Beautiful People	Roger Midge	
2001	Chunky Monkey	Geoffrey	
2006	The Number One Girl	Director	Direct-to-video
2007	Lady Godiva: Back in the Saddle	Frank Gilmont	
2013	National Theatre Live: The Magistrate	Mr. Wormington	
2018	Peterloo	Mr. Grout	
2020	As Dead As It Gets	Archie	
2022	Toast	Elderly Neighbour	Short film

=== Television ===
Year	Title	Role	Notes
1973	2nd House	Soft or a Girl cast member	Episode: "2nd House in Liverpool"
1975	The Sweeney	Cosby	Episode: "Trojan Bus"
1976	Crown Court	Brian Geddes	Episode: "Pigmented Patter: Part 1"
1976	Centre Play	Picket leader	Episode: "Showcase: Riding South"
1976–1982	Play for Today	Joe / Presenting Officer at Tribunal / Keith Pratt	3 episodes (including "Nuts in May")
1977	General Hospital	Arnold March	Episode: "Sons and Daughters"
1977	Supernatural	Sergeant Cosley	Episode: "Lady Sybill"
1977	The Fosdyke Saga	Josiah Fosdyke / Officer / Ruuek	—N/a
1978	Grange Hill	Mr. Foster	2 episodes
1978	Jackanory	Alf	Episode: "Princess Griselda's Birthday Gift"
1978	Hazell	George Bradley	Episode: "Hazell and the Weekend Man"
1978	Pennies from Heaven	Ted	Episode: "The Sweetest Thing"
1978	All Creatures Great and Small	Mr. Bantock	Episode: "Practice Makes Perfect"
1978	Play of the Month	Barère	Episode: "Danton's Death"
1978	Pickersgill People	DS Terry Tuohy	Episode: "Under the Moon of Love"
1979	Rumpole of the Bailey	Cliff Worsley	Episode: "Rumpole and the Fascist Beast"
1979	Lovely Couple	Jack 'Rollo' Dent	3 episodes
1979	Ripping Yarns	'Baldy' Davitt	Episode: "Golden Gordon"
1979	Shoestring	Freshfield	Episode: "Listen to Me"
1979	An Honourable Retirement	Arthur	Television film
1980	Spy!	Branko Vukelic	Episode: "The Tokyo Ring"
1980	Holding the Fort	Reg	Episode: "Jumping the Gun"
1981	The Dick Emery Show	—N/a	Episode #19.5
1981	Seven Dials Mystery	Stevens	Television film
1981	Coming Home	Ted Maddocks	6 episodes
1981	The Chinese Detective	Roger Horrabin	Episode: "Ice and Dust"
1981	The Gentle Touch	John Knight	Episode: "The Hit"
1981	Theatre Box	Dr Snead	Episode: "You Must Believe All This"
1981–1984	A Kick Up the Eighties	Various roles	10 episodes
1982	Shine on Harvey Moon	Clifford	Episode: "The Rough with the Smooth"
1982	Minder	Silver	Episode: "Dreamhouse"
1982	Kevin Turvey: The Man Behind the Green Door	Park Keeper	Television film
1982	Bird of Prey	Harry Tomkins	3 episodes
1982, 1984	The Young Ones	Henry / Guard on TV / Right Bleeding Bastard	Episodes: "Bomb" and "Summer Holiday"
1983	Blackadder	Three Fingered Pete	Episode: "The Black Seal"
1983	Heartattack Hotel	Harry Clench	Television film
1983, 1984	Up the Elephant and Round the Castle	Councillor Bertram Allnutt	2 episodes
1983–1989	Dramarama	Mr Visor / Dad / Inspector Brown	3 episodes
1984	Starstrider	Starstrider	—N/a
1984	Duty Free	Kev Wilson	Episode: "Snap"
1985	Newstime	Ernie	Television film
1985	Max Headroom	Murray	Television film
1985	Affairs of the Heart	Bank manager	Episode #1.3
1985	The Lenny Henry Show		Episode #2.3
1985	Terry and June	Police Sergeant	Episode: "Mistaken Identity"
1985	Mrs Capper's Birthday	David	Television film
1986	The Comic Strip	Mr Pinder	Episode: "Private Enterprise"
1986	We'll Think of Something	Dennis	6 episodes
1986	Henry's Leg	Det Sgt. Runcie	Episode #1.5
1987	Hardwicke House	Mr Mackintosh	only 2 episodes broadcast
1987	Bad Boyes	Man in the Precinct	Episode: "Money"
1987	All at No 20	Police Sergeant	Episode: "The Prowler"
1988	No. 73	Ted Perkins	Episode #1.3
1988	Turn on to T-Bag	Grimes	Episode: "The African Queen"
1988	Casting Off	Everyone else	Episode: "Jumper Company"
1988–1989	Spin Off	Hilary Rolls	28 episodes
1989	Press Gang	Mr Vader	Episode: "Page One"
1989	Snakes and Ladders	Mr Lambie	4 episodes
1989	City Lights	Roger	Episode: "The Go Between"
1990	T-Bag	P. C. Clod	Episode: "Elementary, My Dear What-Not"
1990–1991	El C.I.D.	Roper	2 episodes
1990–1992	Mr. Bean	The Heart Attack Man / The Blind Man	2 episodes
1991	About Face	Mr Roebuck	Episode: "Sleeping Sickness"
1991	Doctor at the Top	Lionel Snell	6 episodes
1991	Stay Lucky	Gerry	Episode: "A Roman Empire"
1991	Bergerac	Inspector Victor Deffand	7 episodes
1991–1992	Bottom	Mr Harrison	2 episodes
1992	Lovejoy	Ted	Episode: "Angel Trousers"
1992	Boon	Raymond Pearce	Episode: "The Sharp End"
1992	The Life and Times of Henry Pratt	Neville Chamberlain	Episode #1.2
1992	The Young Indiana Jones Chronicles	Vladimir Lenin	Episode: "Petrograd, July 1917"
1992	Rab C. Nesbitt	Ronald	Episode: "Home"
1992	EastEnders	DS Jackson	3 episodes (see also 2012)
1993	Grace & Favour	Inspector	Episode: "The Gun"
1993	The Inspector Alleyn Mysteries	PC Perkins	Episode: "The Nursing Home Murder"
1994	The Brittas Empire	Pete	Episode: "The Christening"
1994	The Tomorrow People	Inspector Platt	5 episodes
1994	Mike and Angelo	Sydney Pinner	Episode: "Trust Me, I'm a Doctor!"
1994	Moving Story	Workman	Episode: "A Piece of Cake"
1994	Wycliffe	Gerald Prout	Episode: "The Four Jacks"
1994	The Bill	Larry Dawes	Episode: "Blackout"
1995	Cracker	Mr Barnes	2 episodes
1995	Crown Prosecutor	Maslowska	4 episodes
1995	Time After Time	Charlie Conway	Episode: "On the Run"
1996	The Treasure Seekers	Wiggins	Television film
1996, 2004	Heartbeat	Sandy / Inspector Les Hackett	2 episodes
1997	Goodnight Sweetheart	George	Episode: "Out of Town"
1997	The Missing Postman	Ron Springer	Television film
1997	Sunnyside Farm	Inspector Dawkins	Episode: "God Has Smiled Down on Me"
1997	Family Affairs	William Cockerill	9 episodes
1997	Richard II	Lord Ross	Television film
1998	Roger Roger	Mr Marshall	Episode: "There Are No Minicabs in Heaven"
1999	Peak Practice	Mr Potts	Episode: "Take Her Back"
2000	The Vicar of Dibley	Mr Badcock	Episode: "Summer"
2000	Midsomer Murders	Ralph Bailey	Episode: "Beyond the Grave"
2000	The 10th Kingdom	Kissing Town Sheriff	Episode #1.7
2000	I Saw You	Mr Frost	Television film
2000	My Family	Police Officer	Episode: "Farewell to Alarms"
2001	The Cazalets	Mr Hines	Episode #1.5
2001–2003	Crossroads	Rocky Wesson	6 episodes
2003	Grass	Derke	2 episodes
2004	Family Business	Norman	Episode #1.6
2005, 2009	Holby City	Gordon Harcombe / Lewis Cooper	2 episodes
2007	Thieves Like Us	Charlie	2 episodes
2008	Foyle's War	Ernie Pond	Episode: "Broken Souls"
2009	Doctors	Ted Hopkins	Episode: "First Love Last Love"
2009	Small Island	Mr Todd	2 episodes
2009	The Fairy Queen	Starveling	Television film
2011	Shameless	Trevor	Episode: "Together in Heaven"
2011	How TV Ruined Your Life	Apprentice-style Boss	Episode: "Aspiration"
2012, 2014–2016	EastEnders	Les Coker	173 episodes
2013	Doc Martin	Wild Bill	Episode: "Departure"
2014	Inside No. 9	Bill	Episode: "The Understudy"
2015	Children in Need	Les Coker	Episode dated 13 November 2015
2017	Man Down	Ted	Episode: "The School Trip"
2018	Still Open All Hours	George	Episode: "Christmas Special"
2021	Breeders	Bob	Episode: "No Connection"
2022-2024	Mandy	Multiple roles	Three episodes
2024	The Cleaner	Frank	Episode: "The Committee"
2025	How Are You? It's Alan (Partridge)	Trevor	Episode 4
