= Filthy Rich & Catflap =

British sitcom

- Series title card
- Created by: Ben Elton
- Starring: Nigel Planer; Rik Mayall; Adrian Edmondson
- Country of origin: United Kingdom
- Original language: English
- No. of series: 1
- No. of episodes: 6

Production
- Running time: 35 minutes (approximate)

Original release
- Network: BBC2
- Release: 7 January – 11 February 1987

Filthy Rich & Catflap is a BBC sitcom produced in 1986 and broadcast in 1987. The series featured former The Young Ones co-stars Nigel Planer, Rik Mayall and Adrian Edmondson as its three titular characters. It was written by Ben Elton (with additional material credited to Mayall), and produced and directed by Paul Jackson, with film sequences directed by Ed Bye. The show's music was written by Peter Brewis. One series consisting of six half-hour episodes was produced. Despite the continuity announcer saying that the show would return the following year, only one series was ever made due to a fall-out between Mayall and Elton over creative control.

The series enjoyed a resurgence of interest in 2004 when it was officially released on DVD by independent DVD production company Playback. The VHS and DVD versions were cut for musical rights. Cuts included Richie singing "Where Is Love?", "Morning Has Broken", and "Consider Yourself"; and Eddie singing "Roxanne", "You've Got to Pick a Pocket or Two", and "Message in a Bottle". A 25th-anniversary DVD was released in 2012.

== Characters ==
- Ralph Filthy (Nigel Planer): Richie's showbiz agent. He is sleazy and sickly and has, to quote writer Elton, "the morals of a dog caught short on a croquet lawn" (a line he would re-use as the tag line for his 1989 novel Stark). Quote: "Boys. It's not often I get excited but right now I feel like I've been locked in an off-licence". His speech is peppered with Polari and he refers to Richie as "Daughter"; his lapel also features a blue rose, a symbol of a quest for the impossible.
- Gertrude Richard "Richie" Rich (Rik Mayall): a half-witted perennially "resting" (out of work) comedian/TV presenter whose most prominent work to date includes links on TVS. Despite this, he considers himself a "veritable superstar" and has paranoid delusions about everyone he meets wanting to either cash in on his fame or assassinate him. Hence, he hires a bodyguard.
- Edward Didgeridoo "Eddie" Catflap (Adrian Edmondson): Richie's faithless minder; permanently drunk, disloyal and violent. Occasionally, Catflap holds up the pretence of being Richie's best friend, although this is usually for personal gain.

== Summary ==
During the run of the series Richie kills several milkmen, Eddie blackmails Richie with a paternity suit scam, Ralph gets sent to prison and hanged, Richie is blackmailed by The Nolans, they spoof newspaper tycoon Rupert Murdoch and feature bodyguards wearing Federation Stormtrooper uniforms that previously featured in the sci-fi show Blake's 7. Richie appeared as a guest on a panel game called Ooer!! Sounds a Bit Rude!, which bore more than a passing resemblance to the BBC quiz show Blankety Blank (which itself is mentioned several times throughout the show). Richie finally becomes famous by slandering everyone in showbiz and becoming the only person censors deem clean enough to host every show on television (precisely everybody, from the "A-list" names down to the entire cast of Grange Hill). This leads to a song-and-dance routine from Richie, celebrating the fact that, in his words, he has "made it!".

As well as the Nolans, other people appearing as "themselves" included Midge Ure and Anne Diamond (then an anchor woman for breakfast TV station TV-am). The show also featured cameos by Barbara Windsor, Lynda Bellingham and Jools Holland. Contemporaries from the alternative comedy scene who also appeared include Stephen Fry, Hugh Laurie, Helen Lederer, Gareth Hale, Norman Pace, Arthur Smith, Mel Smith, Chris Barrie, Lee Cornes, David Baddiel, Andy de la Tour, John Bird and Harry Enfield. Many of these guests had previously appeared in The Young Ones.

== Episodes ==
All episodes directed by Ed Bye and Paul Jackson. All episodes written by Ben Elton, with additional material by Rik Mayall.

No.	Title	Original release date
1	"Dead Milkmen"	7 January 1987
Richie has a paternity suit on his hands, while also killing several milkmen in the process.
2	"Game Show"	14 January 1987
After a disastrous appearance on Ooer! Sounds a Bit Rude!, Richie gets blackmailed by The Nolans over a series of compromising photographs.
3	"Dinner Party"	21 January 1987
Richie and Eddie plan a dinner party to celebrate Richie's 10 years in show business.
4	"A Death in the Family"	28 January 1987
After losing the rights of his game show idea to BBC executives, Richie takes advantage of his terminally ill father to get back in the limelight.
5	"Breakfast Television"	4 February 1987
Filthy gets Richie a guest spot on TV-am reading celebrity gossip. Eddie and Richie celebrate by going on an all-night bender across Britain.
6	"Smear Campaign"	11 February 1987
After being put on trial and blacklisted for drunkenly exposing themselves on TV in the previous episode, the trio start a smear campaign against everyone else in entertainment.
