= Starstrider =

- Country of origin: United Kingdom
- Original language: English
- No. of seasons: 2
- No. of episodes: 18

Production
- Running time: 22 minutes

Original release
- Network: ITV
- Release: 26 July 1984 – 1 November 1985

Starstrider is a children's quiz show that was produced by Granada Television and aired on ITV in 1984 and 1985 and ran for 2 series. The host, Starstrider, a space being from the planet Ulphrates III on the search for intelligence, was played in Series 1 by Roger Sloman and in Series 2 by Jim Carter. Future Doctor Who actor Sylvester McCoy co-hosted both series, playing Starstrider's hapless assistant Wart. Both the host and co-host would greet the teams each week with the words, "Hello and welcome" and similarly they would end the show saying, "Goodbye and farewell".

Each week 3 teams of 4 youngsters from schools around the country played over 5 rounds. The victor school was awarded encyclopaedias and Galactic Federation membership badges.

== Round 1 ==
The teams were asked very difficult questions and 3 members of each team had a series of reference books to look up the answers. The captain was wearing headphones so they can only hear their teammates. The team would give the answer through the headphones. Once they had the answer the captain would press the buzzer and give the answer. If they were correct they scored some points, whereas if they were wrong the other 2 teams continued to search for the correct answer.

== Round 2 ==
This was basically a 'finger on the buzzer' round were the team captains were asked questions and whoever buzzed in and gave a correct answer scored the points. An incorrect answer meant the question was offered to the other teams.

This was replaced in series 2 by a round where a team member was blindfolded and guided through an intergalactic assault course by the other team members.

== Round 3 ==
This round had 1 member of each team riding on a rodeo style item (called the Grunderhunter) as used on the fairground while answering questions to score points for their teams.

In series 2 this was relegated to Round 4, as in that series a new round was introduced where the teams had to identify a famous person or landmark in a distorted image which revealed a small piece every 5 seconds. After 15 seconds, the host would read a clue to the teams.

The scoring was if a team guessed correctly in 5 seconds they would score 20 points, 15 points after 10 seconds, 10 points after 15 seconds and finally 5 points if the whole image was revealed.

== Round 4 ==
This was a round called the 'Light Maze' in which a team member was blindfolded and was guided through the maze by the other team members, the maze had red squares and white squares on the floor and if they stepped on a white square they scored 10 points for their team but if they stepped on a red square they lost 10 points.

This was replaced in series 2 by what was Round 3 in series 1.

== Round 5 ==
The final round was another fingers on the buzzer round where the team captains were yet again asked General Knowledge questions but this time the round lasted 2 minutes and the team with the most points at the end of the round were declared the winners.

== Trivia ==
In Series 2 the presenters entered the studio through a laserlight tunnel which you see in nightclubs and also in that series the scores were shown using a laserlight.

There were not any prizes as such on the show but the teams did take home a Starstrider goody bag, including a pin badge, a sweatshirt and a mug.

Both series of Starstrider were repeated on Granada Plus in 1997. Louise Ings and Terri Horner completed the three legged moon rock race faster than any other contestants and remained undefeated champions until the end of the series. They retain the title to this day.

A brief clip of the programme was featured on the 30 Years of CITV documentary, which aired on 29 December 2012 on ITV.

== Transmission guide ==
Series	Start date	End date	Episodes
1	26 July 1984	20 September 1984	9
2	6 September 1985	1 November 1985	9

== Reception ==
The author Tim Worthington wrote, "Starstrider clearly aspired to be mentioned in the same breath as The Adventure Game and Captain Zep – Space Detective, but it made the mistake of simply replacing the originality and interactivity of both with a handful of suitably outlandish if not altogether convincing alien names."
