= Lazarus and Dingwall =

- Genre: Sitcom
- Starring: Mark Arden; Stephen Frost
- Theme music composer: Simon Brint
- Country of origin: United Kingdom
- Original language: English
- No. of series: 1
- No. of episodes: 6

Production
- Running time: 22 minutes

Original release
- Network: BBC2
- Release: 1 February – 8 March 1991

Lazarus and Dingwall is a short-lived British sitcom television series, featuring Mark Arden and Stephen Frost. It aired on BBC2 from 1 February 1991 to 8 March 1991, and was a spoof of police dramas.
