= The Young Ones (TV series) =

British sitcom (1982–1984)

- Genre: Sitcom; Farce; Slapstick
- Written by: Ben Elton; Rik Mayall; Lise Mayer; Additional material: Alexei Sayle
- Directed by: Paul Jackson; Geoff Posner; Ed Bye
- Starring: Adrian Edmondson; Rik Mayall; Nigel Planer; Christopher Ryan; Alexei Sayle
- Opening theme: "The Young Ones" written by Sid Tepper and Roy C. Bennett performed by the cast
- Country of origin: United Kingdom
- Original language: English
- No. of series: 2
- No. of episodes: 12

Production
- Producer: Paul Jackson
- Running time: approx. 35 minutes
- Production company: BBC Television

Original release
- Network: BBC2
- Release: 9 November 1982 – 19 June 1984

The Young Ones is a British sitcom written by Rik Mayall, Ben Elton, and Lise Mayer, starring Adrian Edmondson, Mayall, Nigel Planer, Christopher Ryan, and Alexei Sayle, and broadcast on BBC2 for two series, first shown in 1982 and 1984. The show focused on the lives of four dissimilar students and their landlord's family on different plots that often included anarchic, offbeat, surreal humour. The show often included slapstick gags, visual humour and surreal jokes sometimes acted out by puppets, with each episode also featuring a notable selection of guest stars and musical numbers from various performers.

The Young Ones helped bring alternative comedy to British television in the 1980s and made household names of its writers and performers. The show became a notable icon of 1980s British popular culture, and it received its own game and a home-media release while becoming the first non-music-related programme to appear on MTV in the United States in 1985. The show was voted number 31 in the BBC's Best Sitcom poll in 2004.

== History ==
In the early 1980s, much of the programme's cast performed on London's comedy club circuit, gaining significant popularity at The Comedy Store. Alexei Sayle was the prominent act, drawing attention as the manic, aggressive compere; Adrian Edmondson and Rik Mayall worked together in the troupe 20th Century Coyote and later became the double act The Dangerous Brothers; and Nigel Planer worked in the double act "The Outer Limits" alongside Peter Richardson. All principal members later opted to make their own club as The Comedy Store became popular, and they formed The Comic Strip in the Raymond Revuebar club in Soho with French and Saunders and Arnold Brown. The new club proved immensely popular amongst London's comedy venues and brought the group to the attention of Jeremy Isaacs, head of the new Channel 4.

Richardson opted to bring the group to television in a project entitled The Comic Strip Presents... and began negotiations with the new channel to secure a deal for a series of six self-contained half-hour films, in which the group would perform as comedy actors rather than stand-up performers. Channel 4 agreed to the deal and aired the programme on the channel's opening night on 2 November 1982. In response to this, the BBC opted to recruit the group for its own comedy projects, and it began negotiations with Edmondson, Mayall, Richardson, Planer and Sayle to star in a sitcom that would operate on a similar broadcast arrangement, under the title of The Young Ones, which alludes to and subverts the song of the same name, written by Sid Tepper and Roy C. Bennett and performed by Cliff Richard and The Shadows, which had become a No. 1 UK hit single in 1962. The group agreed to join the project and work proceeded on the sitcom, with Mayall co-writing the scripts with his then girlfriend Lise Mayer, and Ben Elton (who had attended the University of Manchester with Mayall and Edmondson). Paul Jackson was installed as a producer, but his presence led to him clashing with Richardson, forcing the latter to abandon the project. As a result, his replacement was Christopher Ryan, the only member of the group who was not a stand-up comedian. According to Jackson, the finished project was met with complete disbelief by the BBC, but the recent arrival of Channel 4 led the broadcaster to air what had been created a week after its opening night, on 9 November.

To help make it stand out, the group opted to combine traditional sitcom style with violent slapstick, non-sequitur plot turns, and surrealism. These older styles were mixed with the working and lower-middle class attitudes of the growing 1980s alternative comedy boom, in which all the principal performers except Ryan had been involved. In addition, it was also decided that every episode, with the exception of one, would feature a live performance by a band, including Madness, Motörhead, and The Damned. This was a device used to qualify the series for a larger budget, as variety shows attracted higher fees than comedy at the time. Episodes were generally produced to be over 35 minutes long, though were edited to half-hour when later repeated on the BBC or satellite channels.

== Premise ==
The programme focuses on the lives of four undergraduate students who share a house in squalid condition (with the fictitious address of 15 Credibility Street), while studying at the fictional Scumbag College, London.

The content of the episodes could be classified as a comedy of manners, because of its take on British culture, political climate and social backgrounds during the 1980s. A particular example of this is the second series' use of "flash frames", in each episode, to mock the public's fear of subliminal messages in television and music. The Young Ones was more notable for its use of violent slapstick, which Edmondson and Mayall had been using in their double-act routines, the use of surreal elements such as puppets playing the role of talking animals or objects (in a similar manner to The Goodies), use of lengthy cutaways with no relation to the episode's plot, and frequent breaches of the fourth wall for comedic efforts, either to break a punchline to a joke or make a plot point obvious; in several occasions, Sayle used this element to break from his character and address the audience in his real-life Liverpudlian accent.

Rik Mayall once jokingly said that the household was effectively a nuclear family, with Mike as the father, Neil as the mother, Vyvyan as the rebellious son, and Rick (with a pig-tail) as the daughter.

=== Cast ===
The Young Ones had a regular cast of five:

- Adrian Edmondson as Vyvyan "Vyv" Basterd, a punk rock fan and medical student; psychopathic, sociopathic, sadistic, and misanthropic. Vyv was mostly violent and unruly, respecting Mike and tending to pick on his fellow students Rick and Neil, primarily focusing on antagonising the former to the point that they are virtually inseparable. Vyvyan owned both a talking Glaswegian hamster named Special Patrol Group ("SPG" for short), who is subjected to Vyvyan's extreme violence, and a yellow Ford Anglia with red flames painted along the sides and "Vyv" written across the back window.
- Rik Mayall as Rick, studying sociology and/or domestic sciences (depending on the episode); hypocritical, radical, attention-seeking, and a self-proclaimed anarchist. Rick is mostly critical towards the others, often insulting Neil but also occasionally Vyvyan (despite Vyvyan's violent retaliation to criticism). He proclaimed himself as a vegetarian and an avid fan of Cliff Richard, while constantly adapting himself to different political beliefs, depending on how they will benefit him in a particular situation, despite displaying little understanding of them. According to Ben Elton, Mayall's character was influenced by the "try-hard wanna-be Leftie" typically found on university campuses.
- Nigel Planer as Neil Pye, a Peace Studies student; a morose, pessimistic hippie with pacifist leanings. Neil often wound up having to do all the chores around the house, while the other three students barely acknowledged his presence unless they could blame him for something going wrong.
- Christopher Ryan as Mike the Cool Person, an unscrupulous student; cool, well-dressed, and generally respected. Mike was the straight man and nominal leader of the group. He often conducted profitable business to benefit himself to the detriment of others, but also to keep the others calm during unforeseen issues or situations. It was implied that he held on to his student status through blackmailing the university's senior staff.
- Alexei Sayle as various eccentric supporting characters, mostly the students' landlord Jerzei (Jeremy) Balowski and his family. Jerzei himself was a faux-Russian in that he mainly used a Russian accent to sound "more sophisticated".

Alongside the main cast, the programme also featured a variety of guest appearances, including comedians, actors, and singers, who each took on the role of a supporting character in an episode's plot or cutaway elements. Notable guests on the programme included Ben Elton, Dawn French, Jennifer Saunders, Hale and Pace, Stephen Fry, Hugh Laurie, Mark Arden, Stephen Frost, Jools Holland, Mel Smith, Griff Rhys Jones, Anthony Sharp, Terry Jones, Chris Barrie, Helen Lederer, Keith Allen, Paul Merton, Paul Bradley, Pauline Melville, Tamsin Heatley, Ronnie Golden, Roger Sloman, Lee Cornes, Helen Atkinson Wood, Norman Lovett, Lenny Henry, David Rappaport, Robbie Coltrane, Tony Robinson, Andy De La Tour, and Emma Thompson.

== International broadcast ==
In the United States, The Young Ones started airing on MTV (edited for content) on 5 June 1985. The show also ran on PBS, USA Network's Night Flight, Comedy Central in 1994, and BBC America in the early 2000s.

In New Zealand, the show premiered late at night on 23 August 1985, after TVNZ purchased the broadcast rights.

In the Netherlands, the show was aired in 1985 by public broadcaster VPRO. The show also ran on public broadcaster BNN in 2002.

In the Basque Country, public broadcaster ETB1 began airing the show in 1985 in Basque language with the name Gazteak (The Young Ones) with great success among Basque younger audiences.

In Catalonia, public broadcaster TV3 began airing the show in February 1986 on a Sunday evening slot. The show became very popular and got several re-runs in successive years. In 2016, Nigel Planer appeared in a show involving foreign travellers visiting Catalonia. One of the characteristics of the Catalan dubbing is that Vyvyan speaks with a thick Catalan rural accent, totally opposed to his urban environment in the series.

In Galicia, it was shown on regional channel TVG with great success among younger audiences.

In Sweden it was called Hemma värst and was first broadcast in October 1985 by the public broadcaster Sveriges Television in its original English language with Swedish subtitles.

== Music ==
The series' opening theme song featured the cast singing Cliff Richard and The Shadows's UK No. 1 song "The Young Ones" (1961), the title song from the film of the same name. Throughout the series there are many references to Richard, as Mayall's character is a devoted fan.

The theme over the end credits was written by Peter Brewis, who also created the incidental music on many episodes.

In 1984, after the second series, Planer (in character as Neil) reached No. 2 in the UK charts with a version of Traffic's "Hole in My Shoe". The accompanying Neil's Heavy Concept Album, a loose collection of songs and spoken comedy, included appearances by The Young Ones alumni Dawn French and Stephen Fry.

In 1986 the cast sang "Living Doll" with Cliff Richard and Hank Marvin for Comic Relief. The song, a reworking of his 1959 hit, reached the top of the UK, Australian, and New Zealand Charts.

Eleven of the twelve episodes had a musical guest performing in the house or street. By including the groups, the show qualified as variety rather than light entertainment by the BBC and was allocated a bigger budget than a sitcom. Groups that appeared included Amazulu, Ronnie Golden, Dexys Midnight Runners, Motörhead, The Damned, Nine Below Zero, Rip Rig + Panic, Ken Bishops Nice Twelve, Radical Posture, John Otway and Madness, who appeared in two episodes. The one episode that featured no musical act still fulfilled the variety criteria by including a lion tamer whose presence also directly contributed to the plot.

Some of these performances were omitted from DVD release for copyright reasons. Some musical acts were also edited out for similar reasons on some satellite reruns. On the 2007 DVD release, all the music acts are restored uncut.

== The fifth housemate ==
In the first six episodes of the series, a person whose face is covered by hair appears in the background of some scenes, such as to the left when Neil gets hit by Vyvyan with a kettle in "Bomb". In the episode "Demolition", the person appears slumped against the back wall when Rick is watching TV. These rumours of a mysterious fifth housemate have been the subject of fan speculation on the internet.

In 2016, journalist Peter Farquhar sent members of the cast and crew email enquiries about this unnamed character. Writer Ben Elton replied, saying "I have no idea what you are talking about I'm afraid..." By contrast, one of the directors of the series, Geoff Posner, said that he and Paul Jackson "thought it would be fun to have some ghostly figure in the background of some scenes that was never explained or talked about..."

During an event at the Bristol Slapstick Festival 2018, Adrian Edmondson was asked about the fifth housemate during an audience question session, and named the person playing the 'fifth housemate' as his university friend Mark Dewison. Mark also played a speaking role as Neil's friend (also called 'Neil') during the series one episode "Interesting". He emerges from Vyvyan's full vacuum cleaner bag and ends up being shoved into the fridge by Rick. However, Dewison and the fifth housemate appear together in the same shot towards the end of the episode. In a documentary, How the Young Ones Changed Comedy, that aired in 2018 on Gold, series co-writer Lise Mayer said she believed the housemate had arrived for a party at the student house at some point in the past, and had never left.

== Filming locations ==
Although the series was set in north London, many external scenes were filmed in Bristol, namely the suburb of Bishopston, where the student house is situated at the top of Codrington Road. Other locations include the Fascist Pig bank, the launderette and the army careers office, all around the corner on Gloucester Road. The pub in which Vyvyan's mum works, the Kebab and Calculator in the series, was the Cock of the North (since renamed the Westbury Park Tavern) in Northumbria Drive, Bristol. A brief scene in a pharmacy was filmed outside GK Chemists, later taken over by Lloyds Pharmacy, in St Johns Lane, Bedminster. The shop was renamed "OK Chemists" for the scene, in which Mike goes to buy cough medicine, but orders £180 worth of Durex condoms instead—"Force of habit".

== Reception ==
As of 2024, Rotten Tomatoes reports five positive reviews. The series was also praised by Ian Hislop.

== Legacy ==
The end of the series was not the last appearance of The Young Ones. For the British charity television appeal Comic Relief, the four recorded a song and video for Cliff Richard's Living Doll, accompanied by Richard and Shadows guitarist Hank B. Marvin. Alexei Sayle was not involved, as he felt collaborating with Richard was against the alternative ethos of the show, but had already achieved chart success in 1984 with "'Ullo John! Gotta New Motor?".

In 1984, Planer released an album of music and skits in character as Neil, entitled Neil's Heavy Concept Album. Musical direction was by Canterbury scene keyboardist Dave Stewart. It featured Stewart's alums Barbara Gaskin, Jakko Jakszyk, Pip Pyle, Gavin Harrison, Jimmy Hastings and Rick Biddulph. "Hole in My Shoe", a single taken from the LP, reached number 2. Soulwax used "Hello Vegetables" to kick off their Radio Soulwax mix "Introversy."

The program became a cult hit in the United States after MTV began broadcasting edited versions of the episodes during the summer of 1985. Conan O'Brien cited the show as one of his influences during a Q&A at the Oxford Union.

At the 1986 Comic Relief stage shows, The Young Ones performed "Living Doll" live (following a short skit which involved Rick doing a comic song about showing his underwear and bodily parts, before being ejected from the group by Mike, and Vyvyan supposedly having backstage sex with Kate Bush with Neil as his contraceptive). The skit climaxed with Neil claiming Cliff Richard could not perform with them as he was "doing time" (the musical Time was premiering the following week) and John Craven had been booked as a replacement, only for Cliff to then appear. However he was only available to appear on the second night of the run, with Bob Geldof replacing him on the other two nights.

On one occasion, Edmondson, Mayall and Planer as their "Young Ones" characters did a parody of the song "My Generation" by The Who.

Mayall, Planer, and Edmondson reunited in 1986 for the Elton-written Filthy Rich & Catflap. The series had many of the same characteristics as The Young Ones as did Mayall and Edmondson's next sitcom Bottom. Ryan, for his part, was regularly recruited to play roles on associated series (such as Happy Families, Bottom and Absolutely Fabulous). Mayall, Edmondson and Planer have also appeared in episodes of Blackadder.

Both series were repeated consecutively over twelve weeks in early 1985, but went unrepeated for four years, when the second series was shown on BBC2. In the mid-1990s all twelve episodes of The Young Ones were shown on BBC2 in a 30-minute revised format, missing scenes and dialogue. The series was also shown on digital channel UK Gold throughout the 1990s. A mix of both the edited and unedited versions was shown in the 2000s on UKTV G2 and Paramount Comedy 1.

DVD releases were initially very basic: Only the US "Every Stoopid Episode" edition featured excerpts from existing documentaries, and no extra footage was included. Musical references proved difficult to clear so "The Sounds of Silence" (one line) and "Subterranean Homesick Blues" were excised from the US editions. A new DVD release of all episodes ("Extra Stoopid Edition") was launched in November 2007, containing new documentaries and two commentary tracks. This edition restores the line from "The Sounds of Silence" and "Subterranean Homesick Blues". The music video "Living Doll" featuring Cliff Richard has not been included on any edition, and neither is the live performance done for comic relief in 1986.

== American pilot episode ==
A pilot episode was filmed of an American version of The Young Ones, titled Oh, No! Not THEM!. It featured Planer as Neil and Jackie Earle Haley, and had a claymation opening credit sequence. The Fox network did not pick up the series. It was produced by David Mirkin.

Robert Llewellyn wrote in his book The Man in the Rubber Mask (1994):

The Young Ones was taken over the Atlantic in the mid eighties, and Nigel [Planer] was the only member of the British cast to go. He had experienced a fairly hideous time, worried sick that he was going to have to stay there for six years with a group of people he hated who managed to make The Young Ones into a sort of grubby Benny Hill Show. He was hugely relieved when the pilot was a flop and he was released from his contract.

== Episodes ==
When originally broadcast, episodes were shown on BBC2 Tuesdays at 9 pm.

=== Series 1 (1982) ===
No.	Title	Musical performance	Original air date	Directed by
1	Demolition	Nine Below Zero performing "11+11"	9 November 1982	Paul Jackson
2	Oil	Ronnie Golden performing "Coo Coo Daddy Long Legs"; Radical Posture (with Alexei Sayle) performing "Dr. Martens Boots"	16 November 1982	Paul Jackson
3	Boring	Madness performing "House of Fun"	23 November 1982	Geoff Posner
4	Bomb	Dexys Midnight Runners performing "Jackie Wilson Said"	30 November 1982	Geoff Posner
5	Interesting	Rip Rig + Panic (with Andrea Oliver) performing "You're My Kind of Climate"	7 December 1982	Paul Jackson
6	Flood	A lion tamer performs to the song "The Lion Sleeps Tonight" by Tight Fit	14 December 1982	Paul Jackson

=== Series 2 (1984) ===
No.	Title	Musical performance	Original air date	Directed by
1	Bambi	Motörhead performing "Ace of Spades"	8 May 1984	Paul Jackson
2	Cash	Ken Bishop's Nice Twelve performing "Subterranean Homesick Blues"; Alexei Sayle performing "Stupid Noises"	15 May 1984	Paul Jackson
3	Nasty	The Damned performing "Nasty"	29 May 1984	Paul Jackson
4	Time	Amazulu performing "Moonlight Romance"	5 June 1984	Paul Jackson
5	Sick	Madness performing "Our House"	12 June 1984	Paul Jackson
6	Summer Holiday	John Otway performing "Body Talk"	19 June 1984	Paul Jackson & Ed Bye

== Repeats ==
The series achieved a larger audience through 1980s repeat screenings than it did on first run. Repeats of the programme in the 1990s, when the series was considerably older and less topical, fared less well. As Bambi was also screened during a BBC1 Comic Relief evening (not included below), it was the most-repeated episode, with six repeat screenings from 1985 to 1999. The repeat details of the series up to 2000 were as follows:

Date	Episode	Viewers (millions)	Chart (BBC2 Top Ten)
5 May 1983	Demolition	N/A	Did Not Chart
12 May 1983	Oil	2.50	10
19 May 1983	Bomb	3.90	6
26 May 1983	Boring	N/A	Did Not Chart
2 June 1983	Interesting	3.60	4
9 June 1983	Flood	N/A	Did Not Chart
18 March 1985	Demolition	5.90	1
25 March 1985	Oil	5.65	3
1 April 1985	Bomb	5.35	5
15 April 1985	Boring	5.70	7
22 April 1985	Interesting	6.50	6
13 May 1985	Flood	4.80	1
29 April 1985	Bambi	4.30	2
20 May 1985	Cash	6.05	1
10 June 1985	Nasty	5.90	3
17 June 1985	Sick	6.0	2
24 June 1985	Time	N/A	N/A
1 July 1985	Summer Holiday	6.45	3
29 April 1989	Time	5.40	3.
29 August 1989	Bambi	N/A	N/A
5 September 1989	Cash	4.94	2
12 September 1989	Nasty	4.94	2
19 September 1989	Sick	4.8	2
26 September 1989	Summer Holiday	N/A	N/A
20 August 1995	Demolition	2.66	9*
16 September 1995	Oil		
23 September 1995	Boring		
30 September 1995	Bomb		
16 November 1995	Interesting		
23 November 1995	Flood		
30 November 1995	Bambi		
7 December 1995	Cash		
14 December 1995	Nasty		
21 December 1995	Sick		
30 December 1995	Time		
25 July 1997	Sick	N/A	Did not chart
4 September 1998	Bambi	3.16	5
1 January 1999	Demolition	2.93	21
29 January 1999	Oil	2.95	10
15 January 1999	Boring	N/A	Did not chart in Top 30
22 January 1999	Bomb	2.49	30
29 January 1999	Interesting	2.93	21
5 February 1999	Flood	N/A	Did not chart in Top 30
12 February 1999	Bambi	2.53	24
19 February 1999	Cash	2.55	25
26 February 1999	Nasty	2.55	23
5 March 1999	Time	2.86	23
19 March 1999	Sick	2.33	23
26 March 1999	Summer Holiday	2.34	23

- Joint chart placing.

== Home media ==
Both series of The Young Ones have both been released on DVD individually and in a special edition boxset in both regions 2 and 4. Region 1 has two boxsets, one with certain sequences removed due to licensing issues, the other uncut. The entire series is also available for download on iTunes. The series was released on Blu-ray on 28 November 2022 in region B.

DVD Title	No. of Discs	Year	Episodes	DVD release		
DVD Title	No. of Discs	Year	Episodes	Region 1	Region 2	Region 4
Complete Series 1	1	1982	6	—	5 August 2002	29 August 2002
Complete Series 2	1	1984	6	—	18 August 2003	1 October 2003
Complete Series 1 & 2 "Every Stoopid Episode"	3	1982 & 1984	12	17 September 2002	—	—
Complete Series 1 & 2 "Extra Stoopid Edition"	3	1982 & 1984	12	13 November 2007	29 October 2007	7 November 2007

The original VHS releases were in a set of 4, each tape containing 3 episodes. The Series 1 and 2 DVDs are rated 15 and three of the VHS releases were rated PG. There were also complete series 1 and complete series 2 VHS releases. In March 2022 the series was added to BBC iPlayer. The episodes are the 30-minute '90s edits.

== Video game ==
The Young Ones is a 1986 video game based on the British comedy television series of the same name.

The game takes place in the students' home. The player can choose to play as Mike, Neil, Vyvyan or Rick to explore the house and enter different rooms. The other characters become computer-controlled players. All characters can move around the house, pick up and drop objects, as well as break and fix things. The characters often talk, giving the player clues as to what the character is intended to do. The aim of the game is to try and move out of the house with all the character's belongings in the shortest time possible. This is not so easy, because these possessions are typically not in their preferred condition, or are hidden around the house, and players need various tools to get to them. The other characters will move around the house, behaving in-character, occasionally moving around or further damaging the possessions—making the task harder.

The game was published by Orpheus Software, based in Hatley St George in Bedfordshire. The Young Ones characters were licensed from the owners of the BBC TV series, Rik Mayall, Ben Elton and Lise Mayer.

Due to difficulty in licensing the original series music from the BBC, an alternative music sound track was commissioned to sound similar to the original theme. Over 10,000 copies of the game were sold, mainly through Boots stores, Woolworths, and independent computer stores. Due to obscure bugs in the software, it was impossible to solve the game, although few users realised this at the time. Orpheus ceased trading before the problems could be remedied.

== Other media ==
- Ben Elton, Rik Mayall and Lise Mayer (1984). Bachelor Boys: The Young Ones Book. Sphere Books ltd. ISBN 978-0-7221-5765-7.
- Nigel Planer and Terence Blacker (1984). Neil's Book of the Dead. HarperCollins Distribution Services. ISBN 978-0-9075-1642-2.
