= Mark Arden =

British comedian and actor (born 1956)

- Born: Mark David Darwin Arden; 31 July 1956 (age 69); Newbury, Berkshire, England
- Occupations: Actor, comedian
- Years active: 1977–present

Mark David Darwin Arden (born 31 July 1956) is a British comedian and actor, best known for his television appearances. During the 1980s, he was one half of comic double act 'The Oblivion Boys', alongside Stephen Frost.

Arden was born in Newbury, Berkshire. He and Frost came to prominence in the late 1970s alternative comedy boom, and became recognisable to a national audience with regular spots on Saturday Live. In the early 1980s, they were instrumental in the forming of the long-running north London comedy show News Revue, and shortly afterwards began appearing as a pair in episodes of series such as The Black Adder and The Young Ones; they are perhaps most remembered for a series of commercials for Carling Black Label lager, one of which involved Arden and Frost appearing in the nude. Arden continued to perform with Frost in comedy clubs, although he did not follow his partner into the genre of improvisation. Nevertheless, he featured as the chauffeur Johnny Blackpool (a paranoid ex-soldier) in the partially-improv 1994 comedy film There's No Business..., opposite Raw Sex (Simon Brint and Rowland Rivron).

Arden had a role as Roland 'Vaseline' Cartwright in London's Burning, appearing in the original pilot film and the first two series; he has also had roles in such comedies as Blackadder II and Bottom. He and Frost also played the title roles in the surrealist police sitcom Lazarus and Dingwall. Later, Arden appeared in the 1992 film Carry On Columbus and in the 1990s series Harry Enfield and Chums. In October 1996 he played Jansson in an episode of the 6th series of Heartbeat (Snapped).

Arden also has had a theatre career, appearing in Willis Hall's play The Long, the Short and the Tall in the West End. He also played the inspector in An Inspector Calls at the Garrick Theatre, Pop in the musical We Will Rock You at London's Dominion Theatre, and in Fings Ain't Wot They Used T'Be at the Theatre Royal Stratford East.

Arden's television career continued in 2002 with The Estate Agents. In 2018, he appeared in several episodes of Endeavour.
