= Lise Mayer =

American TV and film writer (born 1959)

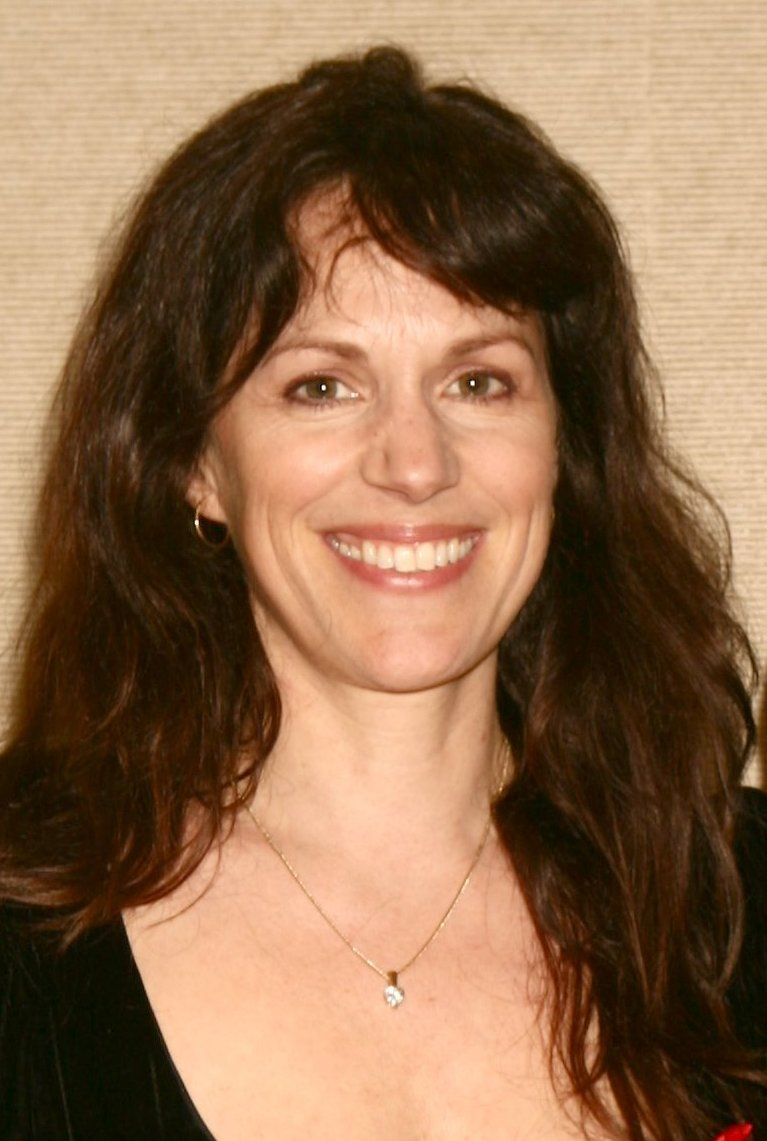
- Mayer at the Lighthouse Gala auction in aid of the Terrence Higgins Trust in March 2007
- Born: 29 November 1959 (age 66); Chicago, Illinois, U.S.
- Occupation: Screenwriter
- Years active: 1981–present
- Partner(s): Rik Mayall; Angus Deayton (1991–2015)
- Children: 1
- Father: David Mayer
- Relatives: Catherine Mayer (sister)

Lise Mayer (born 29 November 1959) is an American television and film writer. She was creator and co-writer, alongside Rik Mayall and Ben Elton, of the BBC comedy series The Young Ones.

== Background and work ==
Mayer was born in Chicago, Illinois, to David and Anne Mayer. She met Rik Mayall when she was at school in Manchester and Mayall came to study drama at Manchester University, where her father, David Mayer, was a professor. Her mother is a theatre publicist. In addition to The Young Ones, she has written for television programmes including The Last Resort, Paramount City, London Underground, The Fast Show, Saturday Zoo and Casualty, and produced Denis Leary's No Cure For Cancer.

She was a writer/consultant for the film The Borrowers, and co-writer of Suite 16, Paper Marriage, Flushed Away and The Matchmaker. Books include Bachelor Boys: The Young Ones Book, People I Have Shot (with ITN cameraman Sebastian Rich), The Utterly Merry Comic Relief Christmas Book, Go to Bed With Jonathan Ross, Amassed Hysteria and In Search of Happiness (with Angus Deayton). She is an activist and filmmaker for the advocacy group The Citizens. She was a script editor and scene leader for You Me Bum Bum Train 2024-2025.

== Personal life ==
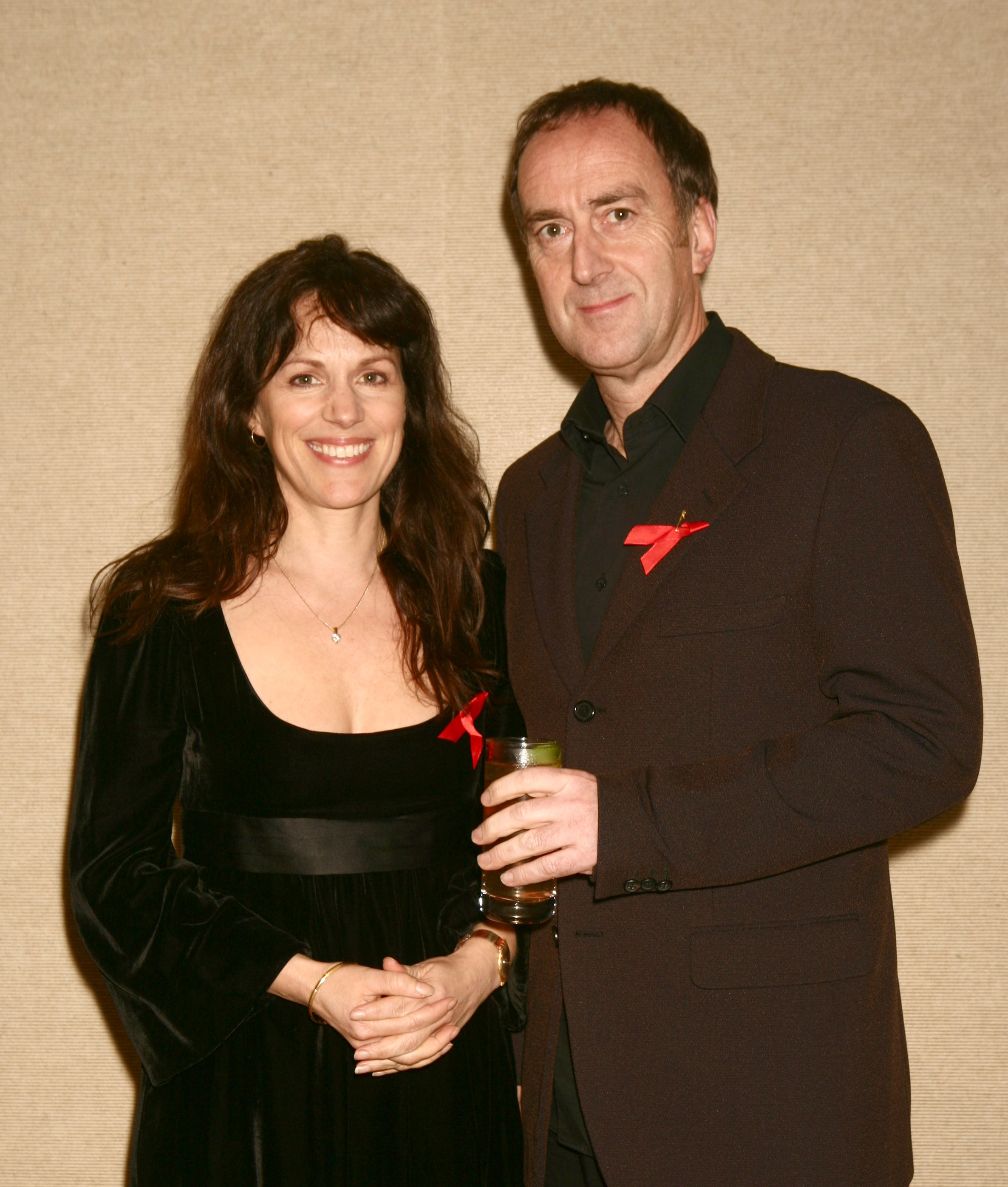
Mayer and her then-partner Angus Deayton in 2007

Until 1985, Mayer was in a relationship with Rik Mayall, including the period when they co-wrote The Young Ones. She has a son with comedian and television presenter Angus Deayton, with whom she was in a relationship from 1991 to 2015. Her sister, Catherine Mayer, co-founded the Women's Equality Party with Sandi Toksvig.
