= Paul Jackson (producer) =

English television director, producer and executive

- Born: Kevin Paul Jackson; 2 October 1947 (age 79); London, England
- Other name: K. Paul Jackson
- Education: University of Exeter
- Occupations: Producer; director; executive
- Notable work: The Two Ronnies; The Young Ones; Red Dwarf

Kevin Paul Jackson (born 2 October 1947), credited as Paul Jackson; sometimes as K. Paul Jackson, is an English television director, producer and executive, known for his production roles within the BBC, ITV, and previously, Carlton and Granada. His most famous television work includes The Two Ronnies and The Young Ones, and as the original producer for the sci-fi sitcom Red Dwarf. In 2006, Jackson was named Director of Comedy and Entertainment at ITV.

== Early life ==
Jackson was born in London in 1947, the son of BBC Light Entertainment Producer T. Leslie Jackson, whose credits included the 1950s series This Is Your Life and What's My Line. He graduated from the University of Exeter in 1970.

== Career ==
=== BBC ===
Jackson began his career with the BBC, joining it in 1971 as an assistant floor manager. Over the next 11 years he was promoted, becoming a director, producer and eventually executive producer, working on a range of the best-known shows of the time - the Larry Grayson incarnation of The Generation Game, Blankety Blank, Top of the Pops and the last series of Steptoe and Son all feature among his credits. However, it is for a quartet of programmes that he is particularly known: The Two Ronnies (which he produced and directed, and for which he won three BAFTA nominations); Three of a Kind (the show featured Tracey Ullman and Lenny Henry and was a winner of the BAFTA award for best entertainment show and a Rose of Montreux); The Young Ones (winner of a BAFTA for best comedy); and Carrott's Lib, a series transmitted live.

He also produced and directed Ben Elton's first solo TV project, Happy Families, with Jennifer Saunders, Adrian Edmondson, Hugh Laurie and Stephen Fry amongst others and the follow-up series to The Young Ones, Filthy Rich & Catflap.

=== Freelance career ===
In 1982, Jackson left the BBC and went freelance, producing The Cannon and Ball Show for LWT and two series of Girls on Top (starring Tracey Ullman, Dawn French, Jennifer Saunders and Ruby Wax) for Central Television. Eighteen months later, he set up Paul Jackson Productions, one of the newly created independent producers made possible by the arrival of Channel Four. The company made Coming Next, a sketch show with Hale and Pace and Chris Barrie as well as several other series. One series gave Ruby Wax her first solo outing, Don't Miss Wax, which was produced for Channel Four. At this time Jackson was a member of the council of IPPA, a forerunner of Pact, the body which established terms for trade between independent producers and the BBC and other broadcasters.

PJP was eventually taken over by Noel Gay Television, a company chaired by the British entertainment executive, Bill Cotton. Jackson served as the managing director and the company produced Red Dwarf, the long-running and internationally successful comedy series, the pilot episode of Bottom (Rik Mayall and Adrian Edmondson) and, working with LWT, the hugely influential Channel Four variety show, Saturday Live. Saturday Live featured such comedy stars as Lenny Henry, Pamela Stephenson, Michael Barrymore, Peter Cook and Barry Humphries and brought to prominence talents such as Ben Elton (as a performer), Fry and Laurie, Harry Enfield and Julian Clary. The company also held the contract to provide all entertainment programming for the short lived UK satellite service, British Satellite Broadcasting and produced shows featuring then unknown names such as Armando Iannucci, Steve Coogan, Lee Evans and Jack Dee, as well as The Happening, a precursor to the long-running BBC show Later... with Jools Holland. In 1988 Jackson also co-produced the Oscar-winning short film, The Appointments of Dennis Jennings, starring Steven Wright and Rowan Atkinson.

=== Carlton Television ===
In 1991, Jackson was a member of the five-man team which prepared Carlton Television's successful bid for the London weekday franchise in the franchise round of that year. He served as a director of programmes for the bid, and was made managing director of the company the night it went on air on 1 January 1993. He later became managing director of Carlton Television Productions, but after the company's merger with Central Television in 1994 Jackson felt this model was at odds with the independent production model on which Carlton had been built and he left barely a year later.

=== Return to BBC ===
In 1996 Jackson was appointed head of BBC Entertainment, overseeing the combined output of all the BBC's television, radio and online content, the only time one person had responsibility for all three areas; and was subsequently promoted to Controller of BBC Entertainment. His time running the department saw the arrival on screen of comedies such as People Like Us, The Royle Family, Marion and Geoff and The Office. He also introduced Ant & Dec to prime time television, with their series Friends Like These. Jackson also oversaw the return of the Parkinson series for its second long and successful run at the heart of the BBC's Saturday night schedule.

=== Granada Television ===
In 2000 Jackson became the CEO of Granada's Australian operations. He turned an underperforming joint venture with local broadcaster Network 7 into a successful independent producer which remains successful. In 2005, after a brief period back in the UK, he went to Los Angeles to take control of the five separate entities that were now all owned by the newly merged ITV. Jackson was CEO and President of Granada USA and executive produced many hit shows including the Gordon Ramsay vehicle Hell's Kitchen for Fox, Hit Me, Baby, One More Time for NBC (both shows making the number one spot in the US ratings during their first season) and Game Show Marathon for CBS as well as Nanny 911 also for Fox, and numerous cable shows for networks including MTV, VH1, WE and A+E.

=== ITV ===
In 2006, Jackson returned to the UK as Director of Comedy and Entertainment for the ITV network, intending to return comedy back to the ITV schedule. As well as cementing Harry Hill's TV Burp into the heart of the network's Saturday nights, Benidorm, Headcases, Ladies of Letters and No Heroics were all commissioned by Jackson's new team, alongside one off comedy films starring talent such as Catherine Tate, Shane Richie, Timothy Spall, Julia McKenzie and Anton Rodgers as well as writers such as Caroline Aherne, Richard Herring and Irvine Welsh.

Britain's Got Talent, which secured the decade's highest audience for an entertainment show, was also commissioned during this period. At the end of 2008, after three years at ITV, Jackson returned to making shows. He became CEO of Eyeworks UK, a London-based entertainment producer. In their first year they produced two films featuring Nadya Suleman including The Octomom, and a series for Channel Five starring Justin Lee Collins.

== Other interests ==
Jackson was the founding chairman of the charity Comic Relief and chairman of its parent organisation, Charity Projects. He remained as chairman for twelve years before following Jane Tewson, one of the founding partners, to Pilotlight, a new venture where he also chaired the board of trustees. Subsequently, he served as trustee of the UK volunteering charity, Timebank, acting as chairman from 2000 to 2002 and from 2006 to the present day. While Jackson was in Australia he served as a trustee of Pilotlight Australia. He has at various times been a board member of The International Emmys, The Aspen Comedy Festival, Frappa and the Entertainment Master Class, as well as serving on the board of Natpe during his time in Los Angeles. From 1994 to 1996 Jackson was the chairman of the Royal Television Society and for four years from 2006, chaired their Craft and Design awards. He is currently on the board of the Riverside Theatre Trust and is a Fellow of the Royal Television Society and the Institute of Directors.

The University of Exeter awarded him an Honorary Doctor of Letters in 2004. He held the post of visiting professor in the School of English at the institution for five years. He has for the last ten years been a frequent broadcaster on BBC Radio 4, including five series of his talk show, In Conversation With.... Four series of Britain In A Box and various one offs such as LA Stories, the companion piece Soho Stories, The Sit Down Comedian and The Godfathers of Comedy.
