= Christopher Ryan =

British actor (born 1950)

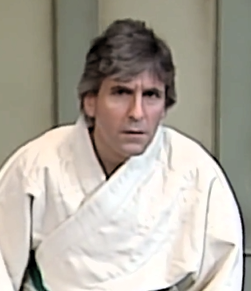
- Ryan in "Back to School Mr. Bean" (1994)
- Born: Christopher Papazoglou; 25 January 1950 (age 76); Bayswater, London, England
- Education: East 15 Acting School
- Occupation: Actor • Singer
- Years active: 1971–present

Christopher Papazoglou (born 25 January 1950), known professionally as Christopher Ryan, is a British actor and singer. He is known for his sitcom roles including Mike The Cool Person in The Young Ones, Dave Hedgehog in Bottom, Edina Monsoon's ex-husband Marshall Turtle in the BBC sitcom Absolutely Fabulous and Tony Driscoll in Only Fools and Horses and its spin-off The Green Green Grass. He has appeared in Doctor Who in the alien roles of Kiv in The Trial of a Time Lord (1986) and Sontaran General Staal (2008, 2010).

== Early life ==
Ryan was born Christopher Papazoglou on 25 January 1950 in Bayswater, London, to an English mother and a Greek father. It is not clear if he spent some time in a children's home in Hutton, Essex, during his childhood. He trained at East 15 Acting School from 1968 to 1971, then began his professional acting career with Glasgow Citizens' Theatre.

== Career ==
=== The Young Ones ===
Ryan was the only Young Ones cast member who was not already well known in British comedy circles, the other principal parts being taken by The Comic Strip members Rik Mayall, Adrian Edmondson, Nigel Planer, and Alexei Sayle. He was a last-minute replacement for Peter Richardson, for whom the "straight man" role of "Mike The Cool Person" was originally intended.

In 1986, Ryan reunited with the rest of the cast for the comedic charity single and music video for Cliff Richard's song "Living Doll", with Richard himself, for Comic Relief.

=== Later career ===
In 1987, he starred in the short-lived BBC sitcom A Small Problem. He played Lucky in Samuel Beckett's Waiting for Godot at the Queen's Theatre in the West End in 1991, alongside Mayall and Edmondson. He later played Dave Hedgehog in Bottom, and Marshall Turtle, one of Edina's unloved ex-husbands, on Absolutely Fabulous. He has also appeared in two major sitcoms: he played one of the Driscoll brothers in an episode of Only Fools And Horses and spin-off The Green Green Grass, a pair of identical twin builders in the One Foot in the Grave episode "Hole in the Sky", and a plumber in the episode "The Valley of Fear". He appeared in Back to School Mr. Bean, My Family and Saxondale. He joined up again with Jennifer Saunders for two episodes of The Life and Times of Vivienne Vyle.

In 1986, he appeared in the science fiction series Doctor Who as the alien creature Lord Kiv in the serial The Trial of a Time Lord, and as one of the rose-painting playing cards in the 1999 TV version of Alice in Wonderland. In 2008, he again guest-starred in Doctor Who in the episodes "The Sontaran Stratagem" and "The Poison Sky", as the Sontaran leader "General Staal", and in the 2010 episode "The Pandorica Opens", playing another Sontaran character, "Commander Stark". In 2012 he appeared in the role of Marshall in Episode 3 "Olympics" of the Absolutely Fabulous 20th-anniversary specials.

Although so far his film appearances have been few, he has played small roles in Santa Claus: The Movie (1985) playing Vout the elf, and in the film Dirty Weekend (1993), directed by Michael Winner playing a character credited as Small One.

Ryan starred as Baron Hardup in the pantomime of Cinderella at the Theatre Royal, Norwich from 17 December 2013 to 19 January 2014.

== Filmography ==
=== Film ===
Year	Title	Role	Notes
1985	Santa Claus: The Movie	Vout	
1993	Dirty Weekend	Small One	
1997	Absolutely Fabulous: Absolutely Not!	Marshall	Direct-to-video
2009	Dead Man Running	Bookie at the Dogs	Uncredited
2012	City Slacker	Frank	
2016	Absolutely Fabulous: The Movie	Marshall	
2019	Sil and the Devil Seeds of Arodor	Kiv	Direct-to-video

=== Television ===
Year	Title	Role	Notes
1978	Target	Jock	Episode: "A Good and Faithful Woman"
1979	Angels	Harry	Episodes 5.13 & 5.15
1979	Premiere	Clive	Episode: "Deasey"
1980	Fox	East	Episode: "Stick or Twist"
1981	BBC2 Playhouse	Tony	Episode: "Days at the Beach"
1981	Play for Today	Hound Dog	Episode: "A Turn for the Worse"
1981	The Olympian Way	Mickey Farr	Episode: "Slim Chance"
1982–1984	The Young Ones	Mike The Cool Person	
1984	The Tempest, Act IV	Ferdinand	TV movie
1985	Inside Out	Tommy	Episodes 1.1, 1.2 & 1.3
1985	Summer Season	Twerp	Episode: "Rachel and the Roarettes"
1985	The Lenny Henry Show	N/A	Episode 2.2
1985	Happy Families	Mell	Episode: "Cassie"
1986	Doctor Who	Kiv	Episode: Mindwarp
1987	A Small Problem	Howard	
1989	Only Fools and Horses	Tony Driscoll	Episode: "Little Problems"
1989	The Russ Abbot Show	N/A	Episode 4.12
1990, 1995	One Foot in the Grave	Plumber; McKendrick Twins	Episodes: "The Valley of Fear" "Hole in the Sky"
1991–1995	Bottom	Dave Hedgehog	Episodes: "Accident" "Parade" "Holy" "Terror" "Dough"
1992	The New Statesman	Ioannis Douvalopoulos	Episode: "Speaking in Tongues"
1992–2012	Absolutely Fabulous	Marshall	Credited as Chris Ryan
1993	Maigret	Basie	Episode: "Maigret and the Maid"
1993	Newman and Baddiel in Pieces	N/A	Episode: "Guilty"
1994	Requiem Apache	Club Barman	TV movie Credited as Chris Ryan
1994	Mr. Bean	Karate Student	Episode: "Back to School Mr. Bean"; Credited as Chris Ryan
1995	Health and Efficiency	Peter Hudson	Episode: "The Old Dope Peddler"
1997	Melissa	Les Maurice	TV mini-series
1998	Mike and Angelo	Brad Schnauzer	Episode: "Out of the Wardrobe"
1999	Alice in Wonderland	Royal Gardener 3	TV movie Credited as Chris Ryan
2001, 2003	My Family	Mr. Hilliard; Rod Baxter	Episodes: "Parisian Beauty" "Canary Cage"
2002	Fun at the Funeral Parlour	Rocky	Episode: "Dog Dago Afternoon"
2005–2006, 2009	The Green Green Grass	Tony Driscoll	Episodes: "One Flew Over the Cuckoo Clock" "Brothers and Sisters" "Home Brew"
2006	SpongeBob SquarePants	Professor Percy	Episode: "Chimps Ahoy"; Uncredited
2007	Saxondale	Ticket Inspector	Episode 2.5
2007	The Life and Times of Vivienne Vyle	Miriam	Episodes 1.2 & 1.6
2008, 2010	Doctor Who	General Staal; Commander Stark	Episodes: "The Sontaran Stratagem" "The Poison Sky" "The Pandorica Opens"
2013	It's Kevin	The Great Spagboletti	Episode #1.4

=== Audio drama ===
Year	Title	Role	Notes
2016	Doctor Who: Classic Doctors, New Monsters	General Stenk/Flitch	"The Sontaran Ordeal"
2018	Ravenous	Macy	"How to Make a Killing in Time Travel"
2018	Jeremiah Bourne in Time	Pete	
2018	Lady Christina	Grunt/Handley	2 stories
2019, 2020	The Paternoster Gang	Stonn	2 stories
2024	Doctor Who: Sontarans vs Rutans	Vrell / Trax	2 episodes

=== Video games ===
Year	Title	Role
2011	Black Mirror III	Additional Voices

=== Music videos ===
Year	Title	Role	Artist/Writer
1986	"Living Doll"	Mike	Cliff Richard

== Theatre ==
Year	Title	Role	Location	Ref.
1977	The Devil Is an Ass	Pug	Royal National Theatre	
1977	Measure for Measure	Abhorson	Royal National Theatre	
1978	The Cure for Love	Charlie Fox	Churchill Theatre	
1979	Bleak House	Conversation Kenge; Trooper George; Various	Royal Court Theatre	
1980	A Flea in Her Ear	N/A	Thorndike Theatre	
1984	Of Mice and Men	Curley	Mermaid Theatre	
1987	A Midsummer Night's Dream	Puck	Regent's Park Open Air Theatre	
1988	Kiss Me, Kate	Joe Ambrosio	Royal Shakespeare Company	
1990	Valued Friends	Stewart	Hampstead Theatre	
1991	Waiting for Godot	Lucky	Queen's Theatre	
1993	On the Ledge	Martin	Royal National Theatre/Nottingham Playhouse	
2003	His Girl Friday	McCue	Olivier Theatre	
2009	Arsenic and Old Lace	Dr. Einstein	Salisbury Playhouse	
2013	Cinderella	Baron Hardup	Theatre Royal, Norwich	
2015	Jeeves and Wooster in Perfect Nonsense	Seppings	Theatre Royal, Nottingham	
