= Rik Mayall =

English comedian (1958–2014)

- Mayall in 1999
- Born: Richard Michael Mayall; 7 March 1958; Harlow, Essex, England
- Died: 9 June 2014 (aged 56); Barnes, London, England
- Resting place: Pasture Farm, East Allington, Devon
- Education: King's School, Worcester; University of Manchester
- Occupations: Comedian; actor; writer
- Spouse: Barbara Robbin (m. 1985)
- Children: 3

Comedy career
- Years active: 1978–2014
- Medium: Film, stand-up, television
- Genres: Alternative comedy, dark comedy, character comedy, physical comedy, surreal humour

Richard Michael Mayall (/ˈmeɪɔːl/; 7 March 1958 – 9 June 2014) was an English comedian, actor and writer. He formed a close partnership with Adrian Edmondson while they were students at Manchester University, and was a pioneer of alternative comedy in the 1980s.

Mayall starred in numerous successful comedy series throughout his career, including The Young Ones (1982–1984), The Comic Strip Presents... (1983–2012), Filthy Rich & Catflap (1987), The New Statesman (1987–1994), Bottom (1991–1995), and Believe Nothing (2002). He starred in the comedy films Drop Dead Fred (1991) and Guest House Paradiso (1999). Mayall won a Primetime Emmy Award for his voiceover performance as Mr. Toad in TVC London's 1996 animated movie The Willows in Winter (a sequel to TVC's 1995 production of The Wind in the Willows, in which Mayall also played Toad). His comedic style, defined by the over-the-top, grotesque and deeply unsympathethic characters he portrayed, was described as energetic "post-punk".

Mayall died of a heart attack at his home in London on 9 June 2014 at the age of 56.

== Early life ==
The second of four children, Richard Michael Mayall was born on 7 March 1958 at 98 Pittmans Field, Harlow, Essex, to Gillian (née Harrild; 1930–2018) and John Mayall (1925–2011). He had an older brother, Anthony, and two younger sisters, Libby and Kate. When Mayall was three years old, he and his parents—who taught drama—moved to Droitwich Spa, Worcestershire, where he spent the rest of his childhood and performed in his parents' plays.

He attended King's School, Worcester, to which he won a free scholarship. He failed most of his O-levels and scraped through A-levels. In 1975, Mayall went to the Victoria University of Manchester (now known as the University of Manchester) to study drama. He claimed that he failed to get a degree, or that he did not even turn up to his finals, but in reality he graduated with lower second-class honours in 1978. It was there that he met his future comedy partner Ade Edmondson; Ben Elton, a fellow student; and Lise Mayer, with whom he later co-wrote The Young Ones.

== Career ==
=== Young Ones and The Comic Strip ===
Edmondson and Mayall gained their reputation at The Comedy Store, from 1980. Apart from performing in their double act, 20th Century Coyote, Mayall developed solo routines, using characters such as Kevin Turvey and a pompous anarchist poet named Rick. This led to Edmondson and Mayall, along with compere of the Comedy Store Alexei Sayle and other up-and-coming comedians, including Nigel Planer, Peter Richardson, French and Saunders, Arnold Brown, and Pete Richens setting up their own comedy club called The Comic Strip in the Raymond Revuebar, a strip club in Soho. Mayall's Kevin Turvey character gained a regular slot in A Kick Up the Eighties, first broadcast in 1981. He appeared as "Rest Home" Ricky in Richard O'Brien's Shock Treatment, a sequel to The Rocky Horror Picture Show. He played Dentonvale's resident attendant as the love interest to Nell Campbell's Nurse Ansalong.

Mayall's television appearances as Kevin Turvey led to a mockumentary based on the character titled Kevin Turvey – The Man Behind The Green Door, broadcast in 1982. The previous year, he appeared in a bit role in An American Werewolf in London. His stage partnership with Edmondson continued, with them often appearing together as "The Dangerous Brothers", hapless daredevils whose hyper-violent antics foreshadowed their characters in Bottom. Channel 4 offered the Comic Strip group six short films, which became The Comic Strip Presents..., debuting on 2 November 1982. The series, which continued sporadically for many years, saw Mayall play a wide variety of roles. It was known for anti-establishment humour and for parodies such as Bad News on Tour, a spoof "rockumentary" starring Mayall, Richardson, Edmondson and Planer as a heavy metal band.

At the time The Comic Strip Presents... was negotiated, the BBC took an interest in The Young Ones, a sitcom written by Mayall and his then-girlfriend Lise Mayer, in the same anarchic vein as Comic Strip. Ben Elton joined the writers. The series was commissioned and first broadcast in 1982, shortly after Comic Strip. Mayall played Rick, a pompous sociology student and Cliff Richard devotee. Mayall maintained his double-act with Edmondson, who starred as violent heavy punk metal medical student Vyvyan. Nigel Planer (as hippie Neil) and Christopher Ryan (as "Mike the cool person") also starred, with additional material written and performed by Alexei Sayle.

The first series was successful, and a second was screened in 1984. The show owed a comic debt to Spike Milligan, but Milligan disapproved of Mayall's style of performance. Milligan once wrote: "Rik Mayall is putrid – absolutely vile. He thinks nose-picking is funny and farting and all that. He is the arsehole of British comedy."

In 1986, Mayall played the private detective in the video of "Peter Gunn" by Art of Noise featuring Duane Eddy.

=== Becoming a household name ===
Mayall continued to work on The Comic Strip films. He returned to stand-up comedy, performing on Saturday Live—a British version of the American Saturday Night Live—first broadcast in 1985. He and Edmondson had a regular section as "The Dangerous Brothers", their earlier stage act. In 1985, Mayall debuted another comic creation. He had appeared in the final episode of the first series of Blackadder (1983) as "Mad Gerald". He returned to play Lord Flashheart in the Blackadder II episode titled "Bells". A descendant of this character, Squadron Commander Flashheart, was in the Blackadder Goes Forth episode "Private Plane". In the same episode, he was reunited with Edmondson, who played German flying ace Baron von Richthofen the "Red Baron", in a scene where he comes to rescue Captain Blackadder from the Germans. A decade later, Mayall also appeared in Blackadder: Back & Forth as Robin Hood.

In 1986, Mayall joined Nigel Planer, Edmondson and Elton to star as Richie Rich in Filthy Rich & Catflap, which was billed as a follow-up to The Young Ones. The idea of Filthy Rich & Catflap was a reaction to comments made by Jimmy Tarbuck about The Young Ones. The series' primary focus was to highlight the "has been" status of light entertainment. While Mayall received positive critical reviews, viewing figures were poor and the series was never repeated on the BBC. In later years, release on video, DVD and repeats on UK TV found a following. Mayall suggested that the series did not last because he was uncomfortable acting in an Elton project, when they had been co-writers on The Young Ones.

In the same year, Mayall had a No. 1 hit in the UK Singles Chart, when he and his co-stars from The Young Ones teamed with Cliff Richard to record "Living Doll" for the inaugural Comic Relief campaign. Mayall played Rick one last time in the Comic Relief stage-show and supported the Comic Relief cause for the rest of his life. 1987 saw Mayall co-star with Edmondson in one episode of the ITV sitcom Hardwicke House, although adverse reaction from press and viewers saw ITV withdraw the series after two episodes, leaving their appearance unbroadcast. He appeared on the children's television series Jackanory. His crazed portrayal of Roald Dahl's George's Marvellous Medicine proved memorable. However, the BBC received complaints "with viewers claiming both story and presentation to be both dangerous and offensive".

Interested in pivoting away from roles similar to The Young Ones, Mayall approached writers Laurence Marks and Maurice Gran, inquiring if they wanted to use him for a new project of theirs. By 1987, Mayall would play fictional Conservative politician Alan Beresford B'Stard MP in Marks and Gran's sitcom, The New Statesman. The character was a satirical mockery of Tory politicians from the era. The programme ran for four series—incorporating two BBC specials—between 1987 and 1994, and was successful both critically and in the ratings. In a similar vein to his appearance on Jackanory, in 1989, Mayall starred in a series of bit shows for ITV called Grim Tales, in which he narrated Grimm Brothers fairy tales while puppets acted the stories.

=== 1990s ===
Mayall starred alongside Phoebe Cates in 1991's Drop Dead Fred as the eponymous character, a troublesome imaginary friend who reappears from a woman's childhood. It received negative reviews upon release and was a modest commercial success. It has gone on to become a cult classic. He appeared alongside Crispin Glover and Tatum O'Neal in the 1991 film Little Noises in a supporting role, filmed in New Jersey, during Mayall's stay in the United States amid production of Drop Dead Fred.

In 1991, Edmondson and Mayall co-starred in the West End production of Samuel Beckett's Waiting for Godot at the Queen's Theatre, with Mayall playing Vladimir, Edmondson as Estragon and Christopher Ryan as Lucky. Here they came up with the idea for Bottom, which they said was a cruder cousin to Waiting for Godot. Bottom was commissioned by the BBC and three series were shown between 1991 and 1995. Mayall appeared in Bottom as Richard "Richie" Richard alongside Edmondson's Eddie Elizabeth Hitler. The series featured slapstick violence taken to new extremes, and gained a strong cult following. In the early 1990s, Mayall starred in humorous adverts for Nintendo games and consoles. With money from the ads, he bought his house in London which he called "Nintendo Towers".

In 1993, following the second series, Mayall and Edmondson decided to take a stage-show version of the series on a national tour, Bottom: Live. It was a commercial success, filling large venues. Four additional stage shows were embarked upon in 1995, 1997, 2001 and 2003, each meeting with great success. The violent nature of these shows saw both Edmondson and Mayall ending up in hospital at various points. A film version, Guest House Paradiso was released in 1999. A fourth TV series was also written but not commissioned by the BBC.

Mayall provided the voice of the character Froglip, the prince of the goblins, in the 1991 animated film The Princess and the Goblin. In 1993, he appeared in Rik Mayall Presents, six individual comedy dramas (Micky Love / Briefest Encounter / Dancing Queen / The Big One / Dirty Old Town / Clair de Lune). Mayall's performances won him a Best Comedy Performer award at that year's British Comedy Awards, and a second series of three was broadcast in early 1995. He provided the voice for Little Sod in Simon Brett's How to Be a Little Sod, written in 1991 and adapted as ten consecutive episodes broadcast by the BBC in 1995. In the early 1990s, he auditioned for the roles of Banzai, Zazu, and Timon in The Lion King (1994); he was asked to audition by lyricist Tim Rice but the role of Zazu went to Rowan Atkinson.

In 1995, Mayall featured in a production of Simon Gray's play Cell Mates alongside Stephen Fry. The play received poor reviews, with many critics panning Fry's performance especially. Not long into the run, Fry had a nervous breakdown and fled to Belgium, where he remained for several days, eventually leading the play to close early. Gray published a diary that same year entitled "Fat Chance" detailing the incident, recalling Fry's departure left Mayall "distraught, in tears of grief, tears of anger" as he continued to perform with Fry's understudy until the play's premature cancellation. In 2007, Mayall said of the incident: "You don't leave the trenches ... selfishness is one thing, being a cunt is another. I mustn't start that war again." Edmondson would mine the Cell Mates event for comedic effect during their Bottom stage tours, such as during Bottom Live: The Big Number Two Tour, where, after Mayall had given mocking gestures to the audience and insulted their town, Edmondson would quip, "Have you finished yet? It's just I'm beginning to understand why Stephen Fry fucked off." Towards the end of the Cell Mates run, Mayall revealed a replica gun—a prop from the play—to a passer-by in the street. Mayall was cautioned over the incident and later conceded that this was "incredibly stupid, even by my standards".

In 1998, Mayall was involved in a serious quad bike accident. The pair wrote the first draft of their feature film Guest House Paradiso while Mayall was still hospitalised. They planned to co-direct, but Edmondson took on the duties himself. Mayall returned to work doing voice-overs. His first post-accident acting job was in the 1998 Jonathan Creek Christmas special, as DI Gideon Pryke, a role he reprised in 2013. Jonathan Creek also featured Adrian Edmondson in a recurring role, though the two did not appear in any episodes together.

From 1999, Mayall was the voice of the black-headed seagull Kehaar, in the first and second series of the animated television programme, Watership Down. In the late 1990s Mayall was featured in a number of adverts for Virgin Trains.

=== 2000s ===
In 2000, Mayall voiced around half of the characters for the video game Hogs of War. Also that year, Mayall appeared in the Great Performances production of Jesus Christ Superstar as King Herod. He joked in the "making of" documentary, which was included on the DVD release, that "the real reason why millions of people want to come and see this is because I'm in it! Me and Jesus!" In 2001, Mayall acted as Lt Daniel Blaney in the episode "The White Knight Stratagem" from the series Murder Rooms: The Mysteries of the Real Sherlock Holmes. In 2002, Mayall teamed up with Marks and Gran once more when he starred as Professor Adonis Cnut in the ITV sitcom, Believe Nothing. The sitcom failed to repeat the success of The New Statesman and lasted for only one series.

Mayall was originally cast as Peeves the Poltergeist in the first film adaptation of the Harry Potter book series, Harry Potter and the Philosopher's Stone. He had filmed his part for the role, but was cut in post-production due to director Chris Columbus and producer David Heyman being unsatisfied with the character's design. Columbus called his decision to exclude Mayall "one of [his] biggest regrets" and campaigned for Warner Bros. to release a director's cut that would include Mayall's performance during the film's twentieth anniversary in 2021. Mayall was not made aware of his cut until the film premiere. Mayall, when interviewed about the film following its release, mentioned how, during filming, the children in the cast were unable to suppress their giggles when he was filming and would frequently corpse. He derisively called it a "crap film."

Following 2003's Bottom: Live tour, Bottom 5: Weapons Grade Y-Fronts, Mayall stated that he and Edmondson returned with another tour.

In 2004 Mayall had a starring cameo role playing the record boss in the video short "ABBA: Our Last Video Ever".

Mayall voiced Edwin in the BBC show Shoebox Zoo. In September 2005, he released an 'in-character' semi-fictionalised autobiography titled Bigger than Hitler – Better than Christ (ISBN 0-00-720727-1). At the same time, he starred in a new series for ITV, All About George. In 2006, Mayall reprised the role of Alan B'Stard in the play The New Statesman 2006: Blair B'stard Project, written by Marks and Gran. By this time B'Stard had left the floundering Conservatives and become a Labour MP. In 2007, following a successful two-month run in London's West End at the Trafalgar Studios, a heavily re-written version toured theatres nationwide, with Marks and Gran constantly updating the script to keep it topical. Mayall succumbed to chronic fatigue and flu in May 2007 and withdrew from the show. Alan B'Stard was played by his understudy, Mike Sherman during his hiatus.

Mayall was cast in Evil Calls: The Raven (2008). For Evil Calls, Mayall's role as Winston the Butler was shot in 2002, when the film was titled Alone in the Dark. The film was not completed until 2008, and was released under its new Evil Calls title to distance it from the Alone in the Dark video game film.

Mayall provided the voice of the Andrex puppy in the TV commercials for Andrex toilet paper, and had a voice part in the Domestos cleaning product adverts. He performed the voice of King Arthur in the children's television cartoon series King Arthur's Disasters, alongside Matt Lucas who plays Merlin, Morwenna Banks as Guinevere, and Phil Cornwell as Sir Lancelot. Mayall had a recurring role in the Channel Five remake of the lighthearted drama series Minder. He provided the voice of Cufflingk in the 2005 animated film Valiant.

In September 2009, Mayall played a supporting role in the television programme Midsomer Murders as David Roper, a recovering party animal and tenuous friend of the families in and around Chettham Park House.

=== 2010–2014 ===
In April 2010, Motivation Records released Mayall's football anthem "Noble England" for the 2010 FIFA World Cup which he recorded with producer Dave Loughran at Brick Lane Studios in London. The release, on 26 April, was designed to coincide with St George's Day and the baptism of Shakespeare. On the track, Mayall performs an adapted speech from Shakespeare's Henry V. In June 2010, the BBC Match of the Day compilation CD (2010 Edition) was released by Sony/Universal featuring "Noble England". After Mayall's death in 2014, a campaign led by Jon Morter began to get "Noble England" to No. 1 during the 2014 FIFA World Cup. It rapidly climbed the charts in the United Kingdom and reached No. 7.

In September 2010, an audiobook, narrated by Mayall, Cutey and the Sofaguard was released by Digital Download. The book was written by Chris Wade and released by Wisdom Twins Books. In the same month, Mayall played the voice of Roy's Dad and recorded five episodes of animation. In November 2010, Mayall provided narrative for five different characters for CDs accompanying children's books published by Clickety Books. The books aid speech and language development by bombarding the child with troublesome sound targets. He recorded introductions and narratives for the titles.

On 5 March 2011, Mayall appeared on Let's Dance for Comic Relief in which he came on stage and attacked Ade Edmondson with a frying pan during his performance of The Dying Swan ballet. Edmondson mentioned backstage that it was the first time in eight years they had done something like that together and claimed Mayall had left with a small bump on his head. It would be the last time the duo performed together in public.

In April 2011, Mayall again revived the character of Alan B'Stard to make an appearance in a satirical television advertisement for the No2AV campaign prior to the 2011 voting reform referendum in the UK. The character is shown being elected under the alternative vote system, then using his newly gained position of power to renege on his campaign promises. In his personal life, Rik Mayall did not support the alternative vote. In May 2011 Mayall became the eponymous 'Bombardier' in a TV advertising campaign for Bombardier Bitter in the UK. The adverts landed broadcaster Dave in trouble with Ofcom when they were found to breach the Ofcom code for linking alcohol with sexual attractiveness or success.

On 23 August 2012, the BBC announced that Edmondson and Mayall's characters of Richie and Eddie would be returning in 2013 in Hooligan's Island, a television adaptation of their 1997 tour of the same name. However, on 15 October 2012, Edmondson announced during an interview with BBC radio presenter Mark Powlett that the project was cancelled prior to production as he wished to pursue other interests.

In September 2012, Mayall starred in The Last Hurrah, a six-episode, full-cast audio series that he also co-wrote with Craig Green and Dominic Vince. In November, Mayall narrated several children's books on the Me Books app, such as The Getaway and Banana! by children's illustrator and author Ed Vere.

In October 2013, he appeared in the Channel 4 sitcom Man Down, playing the father of Greg Davies's protagonist—despite being only ten years older. Davies, a longtime fan of Mayall's since seeing The Young Ones as a child, had Mayall pegged as a fantasy pick to play his fictional father, saying: "During the development of Man Down, it was a running joke that 'obviously' he would play my dad. The part, inspired by my own dad's sense of mischief, was clearly one that Rik could play with his eyes closed, but I didn't think for a second he'd say yes".

On 7 May 2014, Mayall made one of his last recorded performances in the form of poetry and voice-overs read on English rock band Magic Eight Ball's second album, Last Of The Old Romantics, which released on 10 November 2014. Mayall had also recorded for the alpha release of the 2014 video game LittleBigPlanet 3, voicing main antagonist Newton, after having previously worked with Max Kinnings, a writer for the game. Mayall's final television appearance was in the first episode of the second series of Crackanory, which was broadcast posthumously on 24 September 2014 on Dave.

== Personal life ==
=== Family ===
Mayall married Scottish make-up artist Barbara Robbin in 1985, and the couple had three children. The couple met in 1981 while filming A Kick Up the Eighties and embarked on a secret affair. At the time, Mayall was in a long-term relationship with Lise Mayer. Upon discovering that Robbin was pregnant, Mayall left Mayer (who was also pregnant by him at the time) while on a shopping trip with her and Ben Elton, and eloped with Robbin to Barbados. Mayer later suffered a miscarriage. In a 2002 newspaper article, Mayall said that Mayer had since forgiven him.

=== Activism ===
Mayall publicly involved himself in two political campaigns. In 2002, he dressed up as Adolf Hitler for a cinema advertisement opposing the United Kingdom abolishing the pound sterling in favour of the euro as a part of its membership of the European Union. In the United Kingdom Alternative Vote Referendum of 2011, he appeared in a television broadcast for the 'No' campaign in character as Alan B'Stard to oppose the adoption of an alternative vote electoral system for Westminster Parliamentary elections.

=== Quad bike accident ===
On 9 April 1998, Mayall was injured when he crashed a quad bike near his home in Devon. Mayall's daughter Bonnie and her cousin had asked him to take them for a ride on the bike—a Christmas gift from his wife—but he refused because of bad weather approaching, and he went out alone. Mayall remembered nothing about the accident. His wife Barbara looked out of the window and saw him lying on the ground trapped beneath the quad, which had turned over on top of him. Mayall joked that his wife believed he was fooling around and initially left him for a few minutes. He was airlifted to Plymouth's Derriford Hospital, with two haematomas and a fractured skull. During the following 96 hours, he was kept sedated to prevent movement which could cause pressure on his brain. His family was warned that he could die or have brain damage. He was in an induced coma for several days. After five days doctors felt it safe to bring him back to consciousness. In a BBC Radio 2 interview in 2000, Mayall said that when filming Guest House Paradiso, Edmondson made sure he had afternoons free to rest from filming following the accident. He was left with epilepsy as a result of the accident for which he had to take daily medication for the rest of his life.

During Mayall's hospitalisation, the Comic Strip special Four Men in a Car was broadcast for the first time. The film involves Mayall's character being hit by a car. Mayall and Edmondson joked about the event in stage versions of Bottom, Edmondson quipping "If only I'd fixed those brakes properly", Mayall referring to "quad bike flashbacks", and Mayall referring to himself: "You must know him, that tosser who fell off the quad bike." In his 2005 spoof autobiography, Mayall claims that he rose from the dead.

== Death ==
On 9 June 2014, Mayall died at his home in London, following a sudden heart attack after a morning jog; he was 56. His funeral took place on 19 June 2014, at St. George's Church in Dittisham, Devon. Among the attendees were Dawn French, Jennifer Saunders, Peter Richardson, Alan Rickman and Mayall's Young Ones co-stars Adrian Edmondson, Nigel Planer and Alexei Sayle, along with Young Ones co-writer Ben Elton. Edmondson served as a pallbearer. In accordance with his wishes, he was buried on his family estate at Pasture Farm, East Allington, Devon.

BBC Television director Danny Cohen praised him as a "truly brilliant" comedian with a unique stage presence, whose "fireball creativity" and approach to sitcom had inspired a generation of comedy stars.

== Recognition, critical opinion and legacy ==
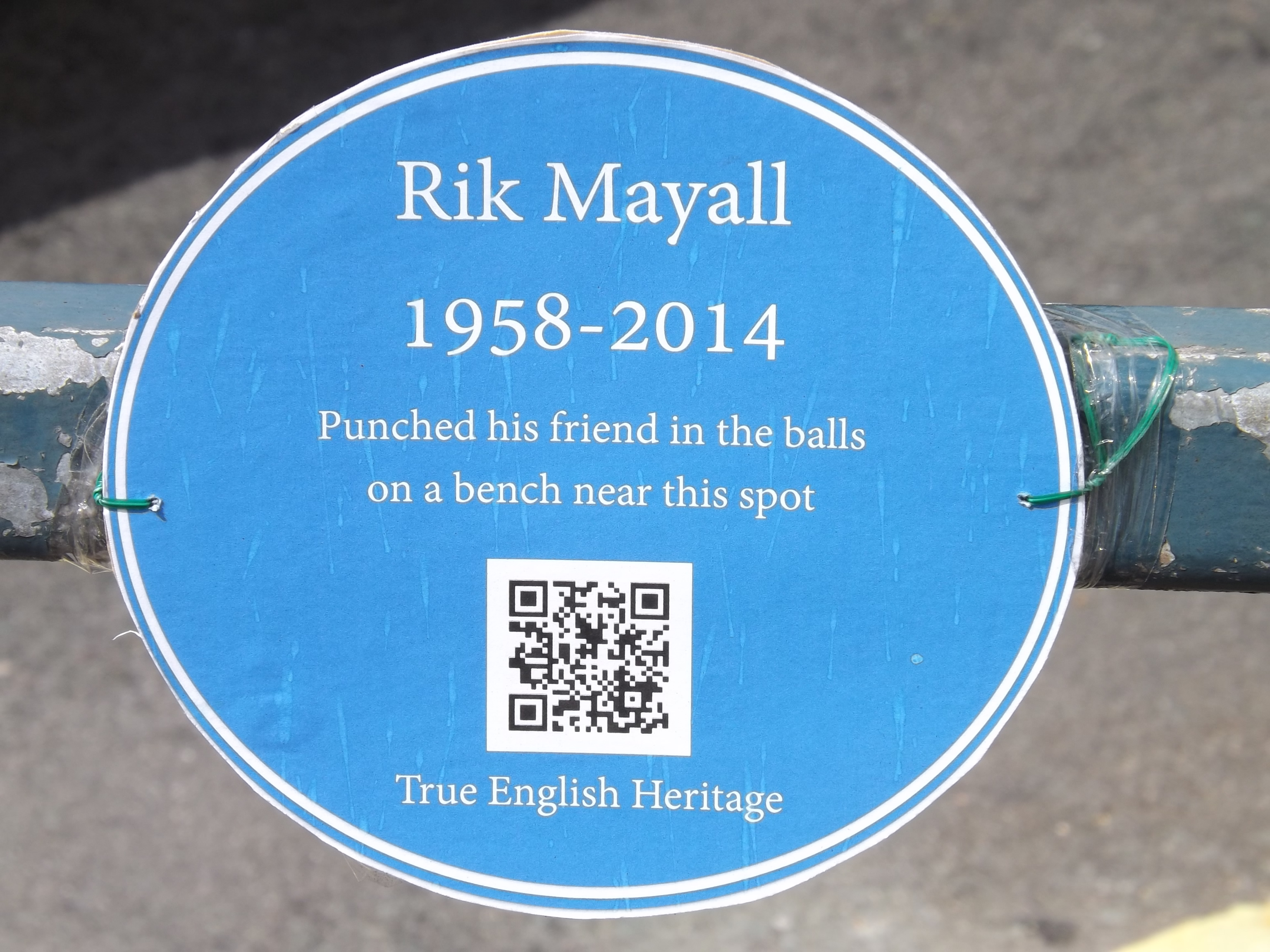
Unofficial blue plaque to Mayall in Hammersmith, London

- 2005, Channel 4 poll, Comedians' Comedian, Mayall was voted among the top 50 comedy performers of all time.
- 2008, Mayall was awarded an honorary Doctor of Letters (DLitt) from the University of Exeter. True to form, his acceptance speech contained a swear word, and reference to his indifferent performance as a student.
- 2010, Mayall was present in Blackpool in August 2010 for the ceremonial laying of the first slab in the Comedy Carpet, commemorating one of his lines from The Young Ones.
- 2010, poll, "Top 100 Stand-Up Comedians", Mayall was placed 91st.
- 2014, on his death, The Guardian described Mayall as an actor whose "onscreen performances were so full of life. His characters weren't neatly drawn sketches: they were vast mad scribbles, jammed to the margins with noise and energy". Commenting on his role in the sitcom Blackadder, it noted, "Upstaging an entire fleet of world-class comedians should have been impossible. Mayall made it look effortless", and that he had replicated this success in his other best-known shows, by becoming the "face of the show" in The Young Ones and creating an "iconic" figure in The New Statesman character, Alan B'Stard.
- 2014, as a tribute to Mayall, an unofficial blue plaque appeared in Hammersmith, London, which referenced the opening title sequence of BBC sitcom series Bottom. At the same time, an online petition was launched in an effort to persuade Hammersmith & Fulham Council to install a memorial bench on Hammersmith Broadway. On 14 November 2014, a memorial bench for Mayall was unveiled on the same spot where the bench from Bottom used to be before its removal.
- 2014, a 20-foot-high (6.1 m) mural of Mayall was created by street artist Gnasher, on the Playhouse at Mayall's birthplace in Harlow, Essex.
- 2025, 11 years following his death, his hometown of Droitwich Spa in Worcestershire held The Rik Mayall Comedy Festival featuring acts including Greg Davies, Helen Lederer, and Shaparak Khorsandi. It is planned to be an annual event.

== Filmography ==
=== Film ===
Year	Title	Role	Notes
1981	Eye of the Needle	Sailor	
1981	An American Werewolf in London	2nd Chess Player	
1981	Couples and Robbers	Morris David Boyd	
1981	Shock Treatment	"Rest Home" Ricky	
1981	The Orchard End Murder	Policeman	Uncredited
1986	Whoops Apocalypse	Specialist Catering Commander	
1987	Eat the Rich	Micky	
1987	Mr. Jolly Lives Next Door	Dreamy Time Escort	Feature film from The Comic Strip presents... series
1991	Little Noises	Mathias	
1991	Drop Dead Fred	Drop Dead Fred	
1991	The Princess and the Goblin	Prince Froglip	Voice, dubbed voice for the 1992 English-language version
1992	Carry On Columbus	The Sultan	
1993	The Thief and the Cobbler	Brigand	Voice, uncredited
1995	The Snow Queen	The Robber King	Voice
1995	The Wind in the Willows	Mr. Toad	Voice, TV movie
1996	The Willows in Winter	Mr. Toad	Voice, TV movie Primetime Emmy Award for Outstanding Voice-Over Performance
1997	Remember Me?	Ian	
1997	Bring Me the Head of Mavis Davis	Marty Starr	
1999	A Monkey's Tale	Gerard the Gormless	Voice, dubbed voice for the 2000 English-language version
1999	Guest House Paradiso	Richard Twat	Also co-writer with Ade Edmondson
2000	Blackadder: Back & Forth	Robin Hood	Short
2000	Merlin: The Return	Merlin	
2001	Kevin of the North	Carter	Alternatively titled Chilly Dogs
2002	Day of the Sirens	Domo Childs	
2003	Chaos and Cadavers	Lennox Crowly	
2003	Sindy: The Fairy Princess	Wizard Azbar	Voice
2003	Oh Marbella!	Greg Dubois	
2003	Cold Dark	Vet	
2004	Churchill: The Hollywood Years	Baxter	
2004	ABBA: Our Last Video Ever	Record Director	Video for Eurovision Song Contest 2004
2005	Valiant	Cufflingk	Voice
2007	Snow White: The Sequel	The Seven Dwarves	Voice, English dub
2010	Just for the Record	Andy Wiseman	
2011	Evil Calls: The Raven	Winston Llamata Jr	
2012	Eldorado	Chef Mario	
2012	Errors of the Human Body	Samuel Mead	
2014	One by One	Ernest	
2015	The Escape	Landlord	Posthumous release

=== Television ===
Year	Title	Role	Notes
1981	Wolcott	PC Fell	1 series
1981	A Kick Up the Eighties	Kevin Turvey	1 series
1981	Kevin Turvey: The Man Behind the Green Door	Kevin Turvey	
1982	Whoops Apocalypse	Biff	Episode: "Autumn Cannibalism"
1982	Northern Lights		Scottish Television play with Judy Parfitt and Annette Crosbie. First broadcast in May 1982
1982–1984	The Young Ones	Rick	2 series, also co-writer with Ben Elton and Lise Mayer
1983	The Black Adder	Mad Gerald	Episode: "The Black Seal"; Note: Character of "Mad Gerald" is credited as playing himself
1983–2012	The Comic Strip Presents...	Various roles	Several episodes and specials (appears in 19 of the 41 episodes)
1985	Happy Families	Priest	Episode: "Madeleine"
1986	Saturday Live	Richard Dangerous	Sketches featuring The Dangerous Brothers
1986	Blackadder II	Lord Flashheart	Episode: "Bells"
1986	Art of Noise: Peter Gunn	Private eye	Music video
1986–1995	Jackanory	Narrator	Voice, Episodes: George's Marvellous Medicine, “The Fwog Pwince: The Twuth!” & Jack and the Beanstalk (Christmas Special)
1987	First Aids	Hank	
1987	Filthy Rich & Catflap	Gertrude "Richie" Rich	1 series
1987	Hardwicke House	Lenny	Episode 5, "The Old Boys". Guest appearance.
1987–1994	The New Statesman	Alan Beresford B'Stard	4 series
1989	Blackadder Goes Forth	Squadron Leader The Lord Flashheart	Episode: "Private Plane"
1989–1991	Grim Tales	The Storyteller	2 series
1991–1995	Bottom	Richard "Richie" Richard	3 series, also co-creator with Ade Edmondson
1993–1995	Rik Mayall Presents	Various roles	Two series of three episodes
1995	The World of Peter Rabbit and Friends	Tom Thumb	Voice, Episode: "The Tale of Two Bad Mice and Johnny Town-Mouse"
1995	How to Be a Little Sod	Little Sod	Voice
1997	The Bill	Patrick Massie	Humpty Dumpty – Parts Two and Three
1997	The Canterville Ghost	Reverend Dampier	TV movie
1998	In the Red	Dominic De'Ath	
1998	Jonathan Creek	Detective Inspector Gideon Pryke	Episode: "Black Canary" (Christmas Special)
1998	Tom and Vicky	Bert/ Squidgy	26 Episodes
1998–2003	Jellikins	Narrator	Voice
1999	Watership Down	Kehaar	Voice, Series 1 and 2
2000	Jesus Christ Superstar	King Herod	Episode of Great Performances
2001	Tales of Uplift and Moral Improvement	Mrs. Ffine Carmody	One series, all 13 episodes
2001	Murder Rooms: The Dark Beginnings of Sherlock Holmes	Lt. Daniel Blaney	The White Knight Stratagem
2002	Believe Nothing	Quadruple Professor Adonis Cnut	1 series
2004	Violent Nation	Presenter	All 3 episodes (Discovery Channel)
2004–2005	Shoebox Zoo	Edwin the Eagle	Voice, 2 series
2005	All About George	George Kinsey	1 series
2005–2006	King Arthur's Disasters	King Arthur	Voice
2006	SpongeBob SquarePants	Lord Reginald	Voice, Episode: "Chimps Ahoy"
2009	Agatha Christie's Marple	Alec Nicholson	Episode: "Why Didn't They Ask Evans?"
2009	Midsomer Murders	David Roper	Episode: "The Creeper"
2011–2013	Who Let The Dogs Out?	Narrator	Voice, Series 1–3
2013	Jonathan Creek	Detective Inspector Gideon Pryke	Episode: "The Clue Of The Savant's Thumb" (Easter Special)
2013	Man Down	Richard Davies (Dad)	Season 1 and 2013 Christmas Special
2013	Damo & Ivor	Alistair	
2014	Crackanory	Story Teller	
2014	Muriel & Floyd	Fritz	Voice, Episode: "Hell in the Pump"

=== Stage ===
Year	Title	Role	Notes
1978	The Comedy of Errors	Dromio of Syracuse	Performed at the Oxford Playhouse in Oxford
1985	The Government Inspector	Ivan Khlestakov	Performed at the National Theatre in London
1988	The Common Pursuit	Nick Finchling	Performed at the Phoenix Theatre in London
1991	Waiting for Godot	Vladimir	Performed at the Queen's Theatre in London
1993	Bottom Live	Richard "Richie" Richard	Recorded at the Mayflower Theatre in Southampton
1995	Cell Mates	Blake	Performed at the Albery Theatre in the West End
1995	Bottom Live: The Big Number Two Tour	Richard "Richie" Richard	Recorded at the New Theatre in Oxford
1997	Bottom Live 3: Hooligan's Island	Richard "Richie" Richard	Recorded at the Hippodrome in Bristol
2000	A Family Affair	Henry	Performed at the Theatre Royal, Brighton
2001	Bottom Live 2001: An Arse Oddity	Richard "Richie" Richard	Recorded at the Royal Concert Hall in Nottingham
2003	Present Laughter	Gary Essendine	Performed at the Theatre Royal, Bath
2003	Bottom Live 2003: Weapons Grade Y-Fronts Tour	Richard "Richie" Richard	Recorded at the Cliffs Pavilion in Southend-on-Sea
2006–2007	The New Statesman	Alan B'Stard	Performed at Trafalgar Studios in London
2007	The New Statesman	Alan B'Stard	Performed at the Churchill Theatre, Bromley, London

=== Video games ===
Year	Title	Role	Notes
1996	Bud Tucker in Double Trouble	Dick Tate	
2000	Hogs of War	Sergeant I.P. Grimly/Narrator; Nobby; Ginger; Den; Basil; Percy; Smith; Bastille; Le Cont; Sanglier; Porc; Yehudi; Duski; Mule; Shogun; Feng Shui; Raw Fish; Herman; Herr Kut; Herr Dry; Herr Raid	Performance to be carried over to remastered version
2014	LittleBigPlanet 3	Newton	Alpha release only. Recast with Hugh Laurie due to death during development

== Books ==
- Bigger than Hitler – Better than Christ (2005) (semi-autobiographical), HarperCollins, ISBN 978-0007207282

== Audiobooks ==
Year	Title	Author(s)	Notes
1992	Grim Tales	Brothers Grimm	
1992	More Brothers Grimm Fairy Tales	Brothers Grimm	
1994	Krindlekrax	Philip Ridley	
1999	The Sound of Trumpets	John Mortimer	
2000	The Dr. Seuss Collection	Dr. Seuss	Consists of The Lorax, Dr. Seuss's ABC, How the Grinch Stole Christmas, and One Fish, Two Fish, Red Fish, Blue Fish
2006	Decline and Fall	Evelyn Waugh	
2007	High Society	Ben Elton	
2008	The Silver Spoon of Solomon Snow	Kaye Umansky	
2009	I Tell You It's Burt Reynolds	Galton and Simpson	Radio comedy for BBC Radio 2 as part of Galton and Simpson's Half Hour
2010	Cutey and the Sofaguard	Chris Wade	
2012	The Last Hurrah	Craig Green, Dominic Vince and Rik Mayall	Audio comedy series, also co-wrote scripts

== Awards and nominations ==
- 1993 – British Comedy Award for Best TV Comedy Actor – won
- 1997 – Primetime Emmy Award for Outstanding Voice-Over Performance – won
