= List of Saturday Live (British TV series) episodes =

Below is an episode list for both the British TV series Saturday Live and Friday Night Live, which were essentially the same production. The series originally aired on Channel 4 between 1985 and 1988, but it briefly returned in 1996, and there have also been a number of one-off special shows. This was a variety show transmitted live, showcasing a mix of comedy and music. For the pilot and the first three series, after the live shows aired, they were edited into shorter compilation shows, which were shown a few months after each series ended.

== Overview ==
=== Series ===
Series	Season	Slot Time	Episodes	Originally released			Director	Producers
Series	Season	Slot Time	Episodes	First released	Last released	Network	Director	Producers
Live Shows
Saturday Live	Pilot show	90 mins	1	12 January 1985		Channel 4	Paul Jackson	Paul Jackson
Saturday Live	Series 1	90 mins	10	25 January 1986	29 March 1986	Channel 4	Geoff Posner	Geoff Posner and Paul Jackson
Saturday Live	Series 2	75 mins	10	7 February 1987	11 April 1987	Channel 4	Ian Hamilton	Geoff Posner and Geoffrey Perkins
Friday Night Live	Series 1	75 mins	10	19 February 1988	29 April 1988	Channel 4	Ian Hamilton	Geoff Posner and Geoffrey Perkins
Saturday Live	Series 3	60 mins	8	1 June 1996	20 July 1996	ITV	Ian Hamilton	Ian Hamilton and Susie Dark
Highlights Shows
Best of Saturday Live	Pilot show highlights	60 mins	1	4 January 1986		ITV	Paul Jackson	Paul Jackson
Saturday Almost Live	Series 1 highlights	60 mins	6	13 September 1986	18 October 1986	Channel 4	Geoff Posner	Geoff Posner and Paul Jackson
Saturday Almost Live	Series 2 highlights	60 mins	8	3 October 1987	21 November 1987	Channel 4	Ian Hamilton	Geoff Posner and Geoffrey Perkins
Friday Night Almost Live	Series 1 highlights	60 mins	8	12 October 1988	30 November 1988	Channel 4	Ian Hamilton	Geoff Posner and Geoffrey Perkins

=== Specials ===
Title	Description	Slot Time	Air Date	Network	Director	Producers
Saturday Live	Re-edited show for ITV's 1986 Golden Rose of Montreux entry	45 mins	22 April 1986	Channel 4	Geoff Posner	Geoff Posner and Geoffrey Perkins
Friday Night Live Lives Again!	Comic Relief Special	60 mins	12 March 1993	BBC1	?	?
Saturday Live Again!	One-off 20th anniversary revival show	90 mins	1 December 2007	ITV	Geoff Posner	Geoff Posner and David Tyler
Friday Night Live	One-off revival for Channel 4's 40th anniversary	95 mins	21 October 2022	Channel 4	Geoff Posner	Susie Hall

== Episodes ==
Full episodes of the live shows have never subsequently been aired since their original showing, nor have they been made commercially available. Instead, individual performances have been re-edited into compilation shows aired by Channel 4 in the same year, or for DVD compilations released between 2007 and 2009.

Where known, the lists below are annotated to indicate if an individual performance later appeared in a re-edited show, or in a DVD release.

All performers and performances are listed in their original running order for each show.

=== Saturday Live (Pilot) ===
Show	Host	Air Time (with ads)	Original release date
—	Lenny Henry	90 mins	12 January 1985
Lenny Henry: Introduction and stand-up (Note: Appears in "Best of Saturday Live"); Chris Barrie: (Impression) Richie Benaud commentates on N.U.M. vs The Coal Board; Carla Mendonça, Helen Atkinson-Wood: Surrogate mother; Chris Barrie, Lenny Henry, Mel Smith: Robin Day (impression) and Fred Dread (character) musical political debate; music The Style Council: "Speak Like a Child"; Robbie Coltrane, Lenny Henry, Carla Mendonça, Christopher Ryan: (pre-filmed) Pastiche of the movie On the Waterfront; music Smiley Culture: "Cockney Translation"; Chris Barrie: (Impression) David Coleman segway; Lenny Henry: Deakus (character); Chris Barrie: (Impression) Ronald Reagan speech; French & Saunders, Raw Sex: Folk song; Chris Barrie: (Impression) Robin Day Chemical Weapons; music Slade: "Run Runaway"; 20th Century Coyote: (pre-filmed) The Dangerous Brothers – World of Danger/Towering Inferno (Note: Appears in edited show submitted by ITV for their 1986 Golden Rose of Montreux festival entry. Aired by Channel 4 22/04/1986.) (Note: Appears on DVD "The Dangerous Brothers – Dangervision"); Sid Field, Jerry Desmonde: 1946 film clip from London Town; music The Style Council, Lenny Henry: "You're The Best Thing"; Chris Barrie, Andy De La Tour: Ronald Reagan (impression) talks nuclear disarmament with Russian official; Abby Stein: American stand-up; Sandy Powell: 1931 film clip from Sandy MP; Carla Mendonça, Chris Langham: Rudy Weiss (character) interview on condom pollution; Lenny Henry, Mel Smith, Andy De La Tour: Job interview; Chris Barrie: (Impression) David Coleman with a pools forecast; music Slade: "7 Year Bitch"; Lenny Henry: Stand-up

=== Saturday Live – Series 1 ===
Show	Host	Air Time (with ads)	Original release date
1	Tracey Ullman	90 mins	25 January 1986
Tracey Ullman: Introduction; John Sparkes: Siadwel (character); music INXS: "This Time"; The Oblivion Boys: Staring contest; Tracey Ullman, Jon Glover, Mac McDonald: (pre-filmed) "The River Country" (a pastiche of the 1984 movies The River, and Country); John Bird: An unemployed defence minister (character); Tracey Ullman, Amanda Dickinson: Kay Clark (character) (Note: Appears in "Saturday Almost Live", series 1, episode 2) (Note: Appears on Network On Air DVD "Saturday Live – The Best Of Series 1"); Robin Driscoll, Rebecca Stevens, Pete McCarthy, Tony Haase, Suggs: "Rich" (soap opera parody); Pete McCarthy: News Flash; Sam Kinison: American Stand-up (Note: Appears in "Saturday Almost Live", series 1, episode 4); Pete McCarthy: Snooker; Wizardz: Fire dance; Pete McCarthy: News Flash; John Wells: (pre-filmed) A Life of Reilli; music Squeeze: "King George Street"; Tracey Ullman: Stand-up; Fry & Laurie: Chocolate Goodies (Note: Appears on Network On Air DVD "Saturday Live – Fry And Laurie, Harry Enfield And Ben Elton"); The Dangerous Brothers: (pre-filmed) Canon/Big Stunt (Note: Appears on DVD "The Dangerous Brothers – Dangervision"); Tracey Ullman: (character) "Betty Tomlinson – Two years on"; Ben Elton: Stand-up – Professional liar; music Feargal Sharkey: "You Little Thief"
2	Lenny Henry	90 mins	1 February 1986
Lenny Henry: Introduction (Note: Appears in "Saturday Almost Live", series 1, episode 6); music The Damned: Eloise; Fry & Laurie: Doubt; Carrie Snow: American stand-up; Pete McCarthy: News Flash; The Oblivion Boys: Studio hands; music Level 42: "Something About You"; music Lenny Henry: Sade parody; Robin Driscoll, Rebecca Stevens, Pete McCarthy, Tony Haase, Gary Glitter: Rich (soap opera parody); music The Mint Juleps: "Only Love Can Break Your Heart"; Lenny Henry, David Lodge, Timothy Spall, Morwenna Banks, Hugh Laurie: (pre-filmed) Notting Hills Cop (parody of Beverley Hills Cop); Stephen Frost, Lenny Henry: Apartheid; music Level 42: "Leaving Me Now"; Lenny Henry: Delbert Wilkins (character); The Dangerous Brothers, John Bird: (pre-filmed) Crocodile snogging; Lenny Henry: (impression) David Bellamy introduces Ben Elton; Ben Elton: Stand-up – Instant noodles, newspapers; Robin Driscoll, Rebecca Stevens, Pete McCarthy, Tony Haase: Commons Select Committee; music Lenny Henry, Darts, The Mint Juleps: Sam Cooke medley
3	Pamela Stephenson	90 mins	8 February 1986
Pamela Stephenson, Brian Wheeler: Outside the studio waiting for Joan Collins; music The Inspirational Choir: "Everything's Gonna Be Alright"; Pamela Stephenson: (Impression) Janet Street-Porter; music Richard Digance: Guitar and comedy songs; The Oblivion Boys: Rupert Murdoch; Pamela Stephenson: (Impression) Ian Paisley; music Paul Hardcastle, Carol Kenyon: "Don't Waste My Time"; Pamela Stephenson: (Impression) Princess Diana; Robin Driscoll, Rebecca Stevens, Pete McCarthy, Tony Haase, Tamsin Heatley, Spike Milligan, Pamela Stephenson: Rich (soap opera parody); The Dangerous Brothers: (pre-filmed) Flying zebra; Denis Healey MP: Recites a poem; The Oblivion Boys: Stage hands; Pete McCarthy: (pre-filmed) The National Theatre screws you up; music Talk Talk: "Life's What You Make It"; Pamela Stephenson: (pre-filmed impression) Sting; Fry & Laurie: Comedy Masterclass; Pamela Stephenson: Wilda Peters (character); Nigel Planer: An Actor Speaks (character); music Raw Sex, Nigel Planer: "You Don't Have to Say You Love Me"; Ben Elton: Stand-up – Getting a Decent Drink; Pamela Stephenson, Michael Redfern: (Impression) Joan Collins arrives; music The Inspirational Choir: "Let's Get Together and Feel Alright"; Pamela Stephenson: (Impression) Joan Collins start the show
4	Chris Barrie	90 mins	15 February 1986
Chris Barrie: (pre-filmed) Introduction outside the studio; Chris Barrie: (pre-filmed) Various impressions; Chris Barrie: (impression) Bob Geldof introduction; music Charlie Sexton: "Beat's So Lonely"; The Wow Show/The Oblivion Boys: Tuxedos; Kate Robbins, Chris Barrie, John Wells, John Bird, Steve Nallon: (impressions) Cilla Black, Ronald Reagan, Denis Thatcher, Mikhail Gorbachev, Margaret Thatcher – Blind Date (Note: Appears in edited show submitted by ITV for their 1986 Golden Rose of Montreux festival entry. Aired by Channel 4 22/04/1986.); music Belouis Some: "Imagination"; Chris Barrie: (Impression) Richie Benaud; Fry & Laurie: Conf. UK; music Nils Lofgren: "Secrets in the Street"; Chris Barrie, Nigel Dempster: (Impression) John Cole reports on Valentine's season with Nigel Dempster; Helen Lederer: Stand-up; music Belouis Some: "Some People"; Kate Robbins, Chris Barrie, Steve Nallon: Blind Date catch-up; Judy Tenuta: Stand-up and accordion; Chris Barrie: Old soldier (character) dictation; The Dangerous Brothers, John Bird, Morwenna Banks, Michael Redfern: (pre-filmed) Babysitting; Chris Barrie: (Impression) Ben Elton introduces Ben Elton; Ben Elton: Stand-up – Jogging; Chris Barrie: Impressions and stand-up; music Charlie Sexton: "Hold Me"
5	Michael Barrymore	90 mins	22 February 1986
Michael Barrymore: Introduction; music Colonel Abrams: "I'm Not Gonna Let You"; The Oblivion Boys: Kidnapped; Susie Blake: Rupert Bear story; Michael Barrymore: Stand-up and stunt; music Mr. Mister: "Broken Wings"; Michael Barrymore: Singing; Harry Enfield, Jon Glover, Helen Lederer: (pre-filmed) The Day After; music Johnny Hubcap and the Axles: "At the Hop"; Arnold Brown: Stand-up; Michael Barrymore: (Impression) Tommy Cooper; Harry Enfield: Stavros (character) – First appearance; Fry & Laurie: Poetry in Parkhurst; music Ruby Turner: "If You're Ready"; Margaret Smith: American stand-up; music Mr. Mister: "Kyrie"; Craig Charles: Poetry; Ben Elton: Stand-up – Double entendres; music Michael Barrymore: Stand-up and singing "We'll Meet Again"
6	Hale & Pace	90 mins	1 March 1986
Hale & Pace: The Management arrive and introduction; music Madness: "I'll Compete"; Hale & Pace: Proclamation; Harry Enfield: Stavros (character) – My daughter Donna; music Roger Daltrey: "Under a Raging Moon"; music Hale & Pace: Singing Doctors; A Whitney Brown: American stand-up; Pierre Hollins: Alfonse (character) daredevil act; Hale & Pace: Club 18-30; music The Walkers: "Hey! Don't Waste My Time"; Jeremy Hardy: Stand-up; Hale & Pace: Saint David's Day; music Madness: "The Sweetest Girl"; Hale & Pace: Billy & Johnny (characters); The Wow Show/The Oblivion Boys and Lee Cornes: E.B.T.; music Norman Pace: The world's greatest lover (character) sings pastiche of "My Way"; The Dangerous Brothers, Norman Lovett: (pre-filmed) Torture; Ben Elton: Stand-up – Girlfriend Threw Me Out; music Madness, Hale & Pace: "See You Later, Alligator" / "Let's Have a Party" / "Roll Over Beethoven"
7	Ben Elton	90 mins	8 March 1986
Ben Elton: Introduction and stand-up – Club 18-30 (Note: Appears in "Saturday Almost Live", series 1, episode 1); music Buddy Curtess and the Grasshoppers: "Real Girl"; Ben Elton, Hugh Laurie: Pop Show; Harry Enfield: Stavros (character) – Today newspaper; Ben Elton: Taxi driver; music The Blow Monkeys: "Digging Your Scene"; music Denise Black and the Kray Sisters: "Acapella" singing; Emo Philips: Stand-up; Ben Elton, Hugh Laurie: Simon Ploppy at drama school; music Hipsway: "The Honeythief"; Craig Charles: Poetry; Fry & Laurie, Emma Thompson: Hush child; Ben Elton: Stand-up – Students; Ben Elton: Metamorphosis; The Dangerous Brothers: (pre-filmed) Exploding politicians; Ben Elton, Stephen Fry: As nuns – One little thing; Jasper Carrott: Stand-up; Jasper Carrott: (pre-filmed) animation; Ben Elton: Stand-up – Double Seat; music Buddy Curtess and the Grasshoppers: "Let My Love"
8	Fascinating Aïda	90 mins	15 March 1986
Fascinating Aïda: Introduction; The Wow Show/The Oblivion Boys: Wow Fashion; Harry Enfield, John Sessions: Stavros (character) – Freddie Starr Ate My Hamster; music Kissing the Pink: "One Step"; music Fascinating Aïda: "Pretend You're German"; Craig Charles: Poetry; Fry & Laurie: A Good Night's Sleep; Rita Rudner: American Stand-up; music Somo Somo: "Masikini Ya Mola"; Emma Thompson: Stand-up (Note: Appears in "Saturday Almost Live", series 1, episode 3); The Dangerous Brothers, Jennifer Saunders: (pre-filmed) How to get off with a lady; music Fascinating Aïda: "England's Green and Pleasant Land"; Emma Thompson, Hugh Laurie: Photographs; Ben Elton: Stand-up – Brush with the bomb; music Girlschool and Gary Glitter: "I'm The Leader of the Gang" (Note: Appears in "Saturday Almost Live", series 1, episode 5)
9	Peter Cook	90 mins	22 March 1986
Peter Cook, John Wells: (Impression) Ferdinand Marcos; music The Communards: "Disenchanted"; The Oblivion Boys: Pot Snooker; Kate Robbins: (Impression) Sarah, Duchess of York; Peter Cook, John Bird: Lord Stockton (character); music Twisted Sister: "I Am (I'm Me)"; Peter Cook, John Fortune: E. L. Wisty (character) – Interesting things; Harry Enfield: Stavros (character) – Video Box; music Hitlist: "Into the Fire"; Louie Anderson: Stand-up; music Twisted Sister: "Leader of the Pack"; French & Saunders, Raw Sex: Studio direction; Peter Cook, John Bird: Workmen in Kubla Khan; music The Communards, The Oblivion Boys: "La Dolarosa"; Fry & Laurie: Flight to Tokyo; Peter Cook: (pre-filmed) (impression) James Last's Britain; Ben Elton: Stand-up – The budget; music Peter Cook: (Impression) James Last's orchestra
10	Steven Wright	90 mins	29 March 1986
music Fine Young Cannibals: "Suspicious Minds"; Ben Elton: Good news intro; Steven Wright: Stand-up; The Dangerous Brothers, Fry & Laurie: Dangervision/Flower Arranging; John Wells, John Bird: Show lawyers at end of series; music The Moody Blues: "Your Wildest Dreams"; Gary Glitter, The Dangerous Brothers: What rock n roll is coming to; music Kate Robbins, Jessica Martin: A song with the EastEnders theme music; Steven Wright: Stand-up; Craig Charles: Poetry; Fry & Laurie: At The Theatre; music Fine Young Cannibals: "Blue"; Fry & Laurie, Stephen Frost, Ken Livingstone: Monopoly; Kate Robbins: (Impression) Cilla Black; music The Moody Blues: "Nights in White Satin"; The Dangerous Brothers: Dangervision – blowing up a wall; Robbie Coltrane, Miranda Richardson, Harry Ditson, Steve Steen, Carey Wilson: (pre-filmed) Pastiche of the movie The Third Man; Harry Enfield: Stavros (character) – Make the sexy bonks with me; The Oblivion Boys: A bit of a fracas; Steven Wright: Stand-up; The Dangerous Brothers: Dangervision – Remove genitals; Ben Elton: Stand-up – Sexist Comedy; Spike Milligan: Postcard from Caspar Weinberger; music The Inspirational Choir: "Jesus Dropped the Charges"

=== Saturday Live (Golden Rose of Montreux 1986 entry) ===
Re-edited show for ITV's 1986 Golden Rose of Montreux entry. Material used is mostly from S1E06, but also taking the Dangerous Brothers sketch from the pilot show, and the Blind Date sketch from S1E04.

Show	Host	Air Time (with ads)	Original release date
—	Hale & Pace	45mins.	22 April 1986
Hale & Pace: The Management arrive and introduction; music Madness: "I'll Compete"; Hale & Pace: Proclamation; 20th Century Coyote: (pre-filmed) The Dangerous Brothers – World of Danger/Towering Inferno; music Hale & Pace: "Singing Doctors"; music Roger Daltrey: "Under a Raging Moon"; Hale & Pace: Billy & Johnny (characters); music The Walkers: "Hey! Don't Waste My Time"; Kate Robbins, Chris Barrie, John Wells, John Bird, Steve Nallon: (impressions) Cilla Black, Ronald Reagan, Denis Thatcher, Mikhail Gorbachev, Margaret Thatcher – Blind Date; music Madness, Hale & Pace: "See You Later, Alligator" / "Let's Have a Party" / "Roll Over Beethoven"

=== Saturday Live – Series 2 ===
Show	Host	Air Time (with ads)	Original release date
1	Ben Elton	75 mins	7 February 1987
Ben Elton: Intro and stand-up – Jools Holland F word + politics (Note: Appears in "Saturday Almost Live", series 1, episode 1) (Note: Appears on Network On Air DVD "Saturday Live – The Best Of Series 2"); music The Communards: "You Are My World"; Fry & Laurie: Take your clothes off (Note: Appears on Network On Air DVD "Saturday Live – Fry And Laurie, Harry Enfield And Ben Elton"); Harry Enfield: Stavros (character) – Bladdy thick or sumthink; music Meat Loaf: "Blind Before I Stop"; music Timbuk3: "The Future's So Bright, I Gotta Wear Shades"; Phil Cornwell: Impressions; Meat Loaf, Stephen Fry: Lost in translation; Julian Clary: Joan Collins Fan Club; Ben Elton, Stephen Fry: Hospital/Last Words; music The Communards: "Heavens Above"; Charles Fleischer: American stand-up; Hugh Laurie, Harry Enfield, Meat Loaf: Driving lesson; Ben Elton: Stand-up – Tampon ads; music Meat Loaf: "Rock 'n' Roll Mercenaries"
2	Ben Elton	75 mins	14 February 1987
Ben Elton: Intro and stand-up – Mark Thatcher’s wedding (Note: Appears in "Saturday Almost Live", series 1, episode 2); music Klymaxx: "Sexy"; Spitting Image: Margaret and Denis Thatcher; Fry & Laurie: Spy briefing/Not too tired; Ben Elton: Stand-up – Young Tories; Harry Enfield: Sir Henry ventrilaquist; music Bob Geldof: "Love Like a Rocket"; Spitting Image: The Queen and Prince Philip; Simon Fanshawe: Stand-up; music Morris Minor and the Majors: "Stutter Rap"; Spitting Image: Prince Edward does stand-up; music Bob Geldof: "The Beat of the Night"; Spitting Image: An audience with Ronald Reagan; Ronnie Shakes: American stand-up; Fry & Laurie: Standing a long way away from; Ben Elton: Stand-up – Young Tories; music Klymaxx: "Man Size Love"
3	Ben Elton	75 mins	21 February 1987
Ben Elton: Intro and stand-up – Leyland and BA; music The Christians: "Forgotten Town"; Harry Enfield: Stavros (character) – Dusty Bin; Fry & Laurie: US of States; Craig Charles: Poetry; music Westworld: "Sonic Boom Boy"; Kevin Day: Stand-up (Note: Appears in "Saturday Almost Live", series 1, episode 7); Julian Clary: Joan Collins Fan Club; Ben Elton: Greenwich bi-election; music Skint Video: Comedy songs; Jan Ravens: (impression) The Queen; Fry & Laurie: Hedge sketch; Gilbert Gottfried: American stand-up; Ben Elton, Fry & Laurie: Quit smoking; Ben Elton: Stand-up – Royal wedding; music The Christians: "When the Fingers Point"
4	Ben Elton	75 mins	28 February 1987
Ben Elton: Intro and stand-up – Ronald Reagan; Rowan Atkinson, Angus Deayton, Howard Goodall: I believe (song and piano); Harry Enfield: Stavros (character) – Losing weight; Fry & Laurie: Lavatory Humour; music The Stranglers: "Shakin' Like a Leaf"; music Lone Justice: "I Found Love" (Note: Appears in "Saturday Almost Live", series 1, episode 3); Rowan Atkinson: Old man (character); Kevin McAleer: Pictures of owls; Punt & Dennis: Stand-up; Rowan Atkinson: In the audience; Harry Enfield: (impression) Oliver Reed; Paula Poundstone: Stand-up; Rowan Atkinson, Fry & Laurie: Jesus and the fisherman; Ben Elton: Audience humiliation; music The Stranglers: "No More Heroes"
5	Ben Elton	75 mins	7 March 1987
Lenny Henry: Joshua Yahlog (character) Introduction outside studio (Note: Appears in "Saturday Almost Live", series 1, episode 4); Ben Elton: Stand-up – Poor old Reagan; music Terence Trent D'Arby: "If You Let Me Stay"; Harry Enfield: Stavros (character) – Go away please; music Gary Howard: "How Big Can You Get?"; Lenny Henry: Joshua Yahlog (character) JYTV; Lenny Henry, Harry Enfield: New home in the country; Ben Elton: Stand-up – Race hatred; Fry & Laurie: Piano masterclass; Jenny Lecoat: Stand-up; Lenny Henry: (impression) Lionel Richie; Mike Macdonald: Canadian stand-up; Lenny Henry: Deakus (character); Ben Elton: Stand-up – Russian initiatives; music Level 42: "Running in the Family"
6	Ben Elton	75 mins	14 March 1987
Ben Elton: Intro and stand-up – Test tube babies; music Erasure: "It Doesn't Have to Be"; Chris Barrie: (impression) Michael Foot; Harry Enfield: Stavros (character) – I'm feeling frustrated; music The Bhundu Boys: "Hupenyu Hwangu" (Note: Appears in "Saturday Almost Live", series 1, episode 5); Fry & Laurie: Confec '87; Ben Elton, Chris Barrie: Chris does John Cole impression; Kit Hollerbach: American stand-up; Ben Elton: Stand-up – British beer; music Gary Moore: "Wild Frontier"; Chris Barrie: (impressions) James Bond auditions; Randolf The Remarkable: Fire eater extraordinaire; Hugh Laurie, Chris Barrie: Talking Rock; Ben Elton: AIDS week; music Erasure: "Victim of Love"
7	Ben Elton	75 mins	21 March 1987
Ben Elton: Intro and stand-up; music The Smithereens: "Behind the Wall of Sleep"; Harry Enfield: Stavros (character) – Evenin' all peeps; John Lenehan: Rope magic; music The Style Council: "The Cost of Loving"; music Perfectly Frank: "That Ol' Black Magic"; Fry & Laurie: Taking and driving away with; Craig Ferguson: Bing Hitler (character); music The Tommy Chase Quartet: "A Night in Tunisia"; Harry Enfield: Jeremy Blandreth (character); Barry Crimmins: American stand-up; Fry & Laurie: Size matters; Ben Elton: Stand-up – McDonald's gherkins; music The Style Council: "Heavens Above"
8	Ben Elton	75 mins	28 March 1987
Ben Elton: Intro and stand-up – Neil Kinnock and Edwina Currie; music The Pogues & The Dubliners: "The Irish Rover" (Note: Appears in "Saturday Almost Live", series 1, episode 6); Harry Enfield: Stavros (character) – Video shop; Andy De La Tour: Stand-up; music Alison Moyet: "Weak in the Presence of Beauty"; Andrew Bailey: Frederick Benson (character) with costume and make-up; Paul Merton: Stand-up; Ben Elton, Fry & Laurie, Harry Enfield: Antarctica; music The Yes/No People: "Some Things Are True"; Joy Behar: Stand-up; The Two Marks: Comedy and juggling; Ben Elton: Stand-up – Privatisation BT, motorway shops; music Alison Moyet: "Ordinary Girl"
9	Ben Elton	75 mins	4 April 1987
Ben Elton: Intro and stand-up – Drinking, sex-changes, Japanese, Russians; music Curiosity Killed the Cat: "Ordinary Day"; Harry Enfield: Stavros (character) – Wedding suit; Steve Rawlings: Fire juggler; music The Sureshots: "I'm on Fire"; Nick Hancock & Neil Mullarky: TV theme tunes; Ben Elton: Greed; Fry & Laurie, Harry Enfield, Ben Elton: Stealing Russia; Owen O'Neill: Stand-up; music Zoot and the Roots: "Sweat and Tears"; Will Durst: American stand-up; Fry & Laurie: House safety; Ben Elton: Stand-up – Hand driers, tap buttons, toilets; music Curiosity Killed the Cat: "Misfit"; (untransmitted) music Curiosity Killed the Cat: "Mile High"
10	Ben Elton	75 mins	11 April 1987
Ben Elton: Intro and stand-up – American Embassy in Russia; music The Inspirational Choir: "Jesus Is Alive"; Harry Enfield: Stavros (character) – ACME removal peeps; Rick Ducommun: Canadian stand-up (Note: Appears in "Saturday Almost Live", series 1, episode 8); music The Boys Wonder: "Shine On Me"; Ben Elton: Stand-up – Flatter squarer TVs; Fry & Laurie, Ben Elton, Harry Enfield: The Antiques Roadshow; John Sparkes: Frank Hovis (character); music Star Turn on 45 Pints: Eurovision entry; Rich Marotta, Twila Zone: Magic act; Fry & Laurie: Burgerworld; Ben Elton: Stand-up – TV obscenity; music The Inspirational Choir: "Do Not Pass Me By"; music Ben Elton, Fry & Laurie, Harry Enfield: "Thanks to You"

=== Friday Night Live – Series 1 ===
Show	Host	Air Time (with ads)	Original release date
1	Ben Elton	75 mins	19 February 1988
Ben Elton: Intro and stand-up – General election and politics (Note: Appears on Network On Air DVD "The Very Best of Friday Night Live"); music Voice of the Beehive: "I Walk the Earth" (Note: Appears in "Friday Night Almost Live", series 1, episode 1); Harry Enfield: Stavros (character) – Arsenal, General Election (Note: Appears on Network On Air DVD "Saturday Live – Fry And Laurie, Harry Enfield And Ben Elton"); Bob Mills: Stand-up; Moray Hunter & Jack Docherty: Donald & George (characters) – Michael Crawford; music Feargal Sharkey: "More Love"; Ben Elton, Stephen Fry, Jimmy Mulville, Harry Enfield: Game Show – Stupid; Josie Lawrence: Florence from Cradley (character) – Pop shows and sitcoms; Ben Elton: Blackie the donkey; Julian Clary: The Joan Collins Fan Club – Leader of the Pack; Harry Enfield: Loadsamoney (character) – The plasterer; Joe Bolster: American stand-up; Ben Elton: Stand-up – The fridge; music Feargal Sharkey: "Out of My System"
2	Ben Elton	75 mins	26 February 1988
Ben Elton: Intro and stand-up – Near misses, Jimmy Swaggart; music Hue and Cry : "Labour of Love"; Hugh Laurie: Exercises with audience; Harry Enfield: Stavros (character) – Accents; Marty Putz: Canadian comedian with props and costumes; music Breakfast Club: "Never Be the Same"; Hugh Laurie, Harry Enfield, Ben Elton: Dreamy, Horny and Farty; Ronnie Golden and Mac McDonald: Roy & Lyle (characters); Jo Brand: Slumberland mattress; music Breakfast Club: "Rico Mambo"; Hugh Laurie: (impression) Jimmy Swaggart; Moray Hunter & Jack Docherty: Donald & George (characters) – Vegetarians; Harry Enfield: Loadsamoney (character) – Earns more than Royals; Ben Elton: Clause 28; music Hue and Cry: "I Refuse"
3	Ben Elton	75 mins	4 March 1988
Ben Elton: Intro and stand-up – Yuppies and SA elections; music The Communards: "Dancing Queen"; Harry Enfield: Stavros (character) – Radio stations; music The Hooters: "Satellite"; Josie Lawrence: Florence from Cradley (character) – Sumo wrestling; The Panic Brothers: Comedy songs (Note: Appears in "Friday Night Almost Live", series 1, episode 2); Ben Elton: Stand-up – Royal Mail; Les Bubb: Gloves on head stunt; Ben Elton, Hugh Laurie: Barbers shop sketch; music The Hooters: "Johnny B"; Josie Lawrence, Hugh Laurie: Olympics interviews; Harry Enfield: Loadsamoney (character) – Fast car time travel; Ben Elton : Stand-up – Advertising; music The Communards: "Matter of Opinion"
4	Ben Elton	75 mins	11 March 1988
Ben Elton Intro and stand-up: Queen Mother; music Magnum: "Days of No Trust"; Harry Enfield: Loadsamoney (character) – In kebab shop; music The Proclaimers: "Throw the 'R' Away"; Michael Redmond: Stand-up (Note: Appears in "Friday Night Almost Live", series 1, episode 3); Arloe Barloe: Comedy in a body-suit; Ben Elton, Josie Lawrence: The Poxy; music The Madness: "I Pronounce You"; Moray Hunter & Jack Docherty: Donald & George (characters) – In the toilets; Darryl Sivad: American stand-up; music The Proclaimers: "Make My Heart Fly"; Harry Enfield: Stavros (character) – In the launderette; Ben Elton: Stand-up – Driving test; music The Madness: "Beat the Bride"
5	Ben Elton	75 mins	18 March 1988
Ben Elton: Intro and stand-up – Budget and end of Ronald Reagan (Note: Appears in "Friday Night Almost Live", series 1, episode 4); music The Primitives: "Crash"; Harry Enfield: Stavros (character) – Has the flu; music Paul Johnson: "Every Kinda People"; Lee Evans: Stand-up; Ben Elton: Stand-up – Commercials for alcohol; The Grand Theatre of Lemmings: Musical chairs; Ben Elton: Stand-up – More about alcohol; Emo Phillips: Springtime depression; music The Bodeans: "Only Love"; Jag Plah: Stand-up; Josie Lawrence: Florence from Cradley (character) – Tanning lotion; Harry Enfield: Loadsamoney (character) – Childhood; Ben Elton: Stand-up – Paranoia and fears; music Paul Johnson: "Until You Come Back to Me"
6	Ben Elton	75 mins	25 March 1988
Ben Elton Intro and stand-up: Edwina Currie (Note: Appears in "Friday Night Almost Live", series 1, episode 5); music Barrence Whitfield & The Savages: "Stop Twisting My Arm"; Harry Enfield: Stavros (character) – Grandfather; music Gillan & Glover: "Dislocated"; Robbie Coltrane: Uncle Don Corleone (character) – Children's stories; Terri Carol: Paper tearing; Judy Tenuta: Stand-up with accordion; music Barrence Whitfield & The Savages: "Rockin the Mule"; Patrick Marber: Stand-up and impressions; Moray Hunter & Jack Docherty, Robbie Coltrane: Donald & George (characters) – In the sauna; Harry Enfield: Loadsamoney (characters) – Sex life; music All About Eve: "Every Angel"; Robbie Coltrane: (character) Mini-cab operator; Ben Elton: Stand-up – Parties; music Ian Gillan & Glover: "Via Miami"
7	Ben Elton	75 mins	8 April 1988
Ben Elton: Intro and stand-up – Nuclear deterrent; music Roachford: "Family Man"; Harry Enfield: Stavros (character) – Wins the pools (Note: Appears in "Friday Night Almost Live", series 1, episode 6); music The Rhythm Sisters: "American Boys"; Josie Lawrence: Florence from Cradley (character) – Quiz Shows; Howie Mandel: American stand-up; music Eurythmics: "You Have Placed a Chill in My Heart"; Hattie Hayridge: Stand-up; Harry Enfield: Loadsamoney (character) – Football tickets; music Roachford: "Cuddly Toy"; Julian Clary: The Joan Collins Fan Club; Ben Elton: Stand-up – British Rail; music Eurythmics: "I Need a Man"; (untransmitted) music Eurythmics: "Missionary Man"
8	Ben Elton	75 mins	15 April 1988
Ben Elton: Intro and stand-up – Near misses, Mother Teresa; music The Pogues: "Fiesta"; Harry Enfield: Stavros (character) – In prison; music The Christians: "Born Again" (Note: Appears in "Friday Night Almost Live", series 1, episode 7); Moray Hunter & Jack Docherty: Donald & George (characters) – On parachutes; Jo Brand: Make-up testing on animals; Andrew Bailey, Harry Enfield: (impressions) Lenin and Stalin; John Mendoza: American stand-up; Harry Enfield: Buggerallmoney (character); Harry Enfield: (pre-filmed) Loadsamoney (character) In the country; Mark Thomas: Stand-up; music The Pogues: "Street of Sorrow"; Ben Elton Stand-up – The press if Jesus were alive; music The Christians: "Save a Soul in Every Town"
9	Ben Elton	75 mins	22 April 1988
Ben Elton: Intro and stand-up – Ron Brown, Nicholas Ridley; music Squeeze: "Hourglass"; Harry Enfield: Stavros (character) – Election; music Hothouse Flowers: "I'm Sorry"; Joe Pasquale: Magic act; Ben Elton: Stand-up – TV advertising; Sean Hughes: Stand-up; Harry Enfield: Loadsamoney (character) – More sex & violence on TV; Josie Lawrence: Florence from Cradley (character) – The Oscars; Ralf Ralf: World leaders; music Habit: "Lucy"; Harry Enfield: B&W sketch; Ben Elton: Stand-up – Difference with alternative comedy; music Squeeze: "The Prisoner"
10	Ben Elton	75 mins	29 April 1988
Ben Elton: Intro and stand-up – Thatcher and the NHS (Note: Appears in "Friday Night Almost Live", series 1, episode 8); music Was (Not Was): "Walk the Dinosaur"; Harry Enfield: Stavros (character) – Arsenal v Luton; Barry Humphries: Dame Edna (character) – In the dressing room at the Strand Theatre; Wendy Harmer: Australian stand-up; Moray Hunter & Jack Docherty: Donald & George (characters) – House of commons; music Harry Enfield: Loadsamoney (character) – "Doin' up the House"; Josie Lawrence: Florence from Cradley (character) – UFOs and Doctor Who; Harry Enfield: Buggerallmoney (character) – Destroy Loadsamoney; Les Bubb: Invisible piano; Barry Humphries: Dame Edna (character) – Stand-up; Doug Anthony Allstars: Comedy songs; Ben Elton: Stand-up – Nudist beaches; music Was (Not Was): "Out Come the Freaks"; Ben Elton: Closes the series

=== Friday Night Live Lives Again! (Comic Relief Special) ===
Shown as part of BBC's Red Nose Day telethon for Comic Relief.

Show	Host	Air Time	Original release date
—	Ben Elton	60 mins	12 March 1993
Ben Elton: Stand-up – John Major; Harry Enfield: Loadsamoney has a new job; Julian Clary: From Sydney, Australia; Newman & Baddiel: History Today; music Right Said Fred and Raw Sex: "Deeply Dippy"; Eddie Izzard: Coming out as a TV; Ben Elton, Vic Reeves, Bob Mortimer: You need a joke with a punchline Ben; Jo Brand: Stand-up – Moral decline; Chris Evans: In the snottery; music Hugh Laurie: "All We Gotta Do"; Ben Elton: Back in the shiny suit

=== Saturday Live – Series 3 ===
This series was directed by Ian Hamilton, and produced by Ian Hamilton and Susie Dark.

Show	Host	Air Time (with ads)	Original release date
1	Lee Hurst	60 mins	1 June 1996
* Details incomplete: Lee Hurst: Introduction; music Lighthouse Family: "Ocean Drive"; Harry Hill: Chicken, liver, carrots, onions!; Phil Davey: Stand-up – Joke Challenge; Sean Meo: Stand-up – Joke Challenge; Junior Simpson: Stand-up – Joke Challenge; Ian Stone: Stand-up – Joke Challenge; Lee Hurst, Phil Davey, Sean Meo, Junior Simpson, Ian Stone, Mark Smith: Junior wins the prize for the Joke Challenge.. Rhino from Gladiators; music Cathy Dennis: Simon Munnery: Urban Warrior (character); Armstrong and Miller: Strijka; Rhona Cameron: Stand-up; Mick O'Connor: Nobby Shanks (character); music Lighthouse Family:
2	Lee Hurst	60 mins	8 June 1996
* Details incomplete: Lee Hurst: Stand-up – Euro '96; music The Mike Flowers Pops: "1999"; Alistair McGowan: (impression) Graham Taylor; Simon Bligh: Stand-up; Alistair McGowan and Andy Gray: Graham Taylor (impression) and Andy talk about Euro '96; Karen Egan and Michelle Read: Women's issues; music Tears for Fears: Harry Hill: Newton Abbott; Lee Chapman and John Barnes: Football banter; Toby Rix: Musical speciality act; Alistair McGowan: Stand-up and impressions; Rich Hall: Stand-up; music The Mike Flowers Pops: "Light My Fire"
3	Lee Hurst	60 mins	15 June 1996
* Details incomplete: music Everything But The Girl: "Wrong"; Lee Hurst: Introduction; Neil Mullarkey, Tony Hawks: The Timid Twins (characters); Harry Hill: All the quiz shows; Armstrong and Miller: Strijka; Simon Munnery: Urban Warrior (character); music Crowded House: Hattie Hayridge: Barbara Windsor, Liz Dawn: music Paul Morocco, Antonio Forcione and Olé: Paul Besterman: music The Incredibly Strange Film Band: TV theme tunes
4	Lee Hurst	60 mins	22 June 1996
* Details incomplete: Lee Hurst: Introduction; Harry Hill: You'd just do anything for a piece of cheese; Leslie Ash and Caroline Quentin: music Ray Charles: "Hit the Road Jack"; Armstrong and Miller: Leslie Ash: Caroline Quentin: music Wow!: Paul Mark Elliott: Lee Cornes: Stephen Frost: Brenda Gilhooly: Gayle Tuesday (character)
5	Lee Hurst	60 mins	29 June 1996
* Details incomplete: Lee Hurst: Introduction; Harry Hill: Cappuccino coffee maker; Armstrong and Miller: music Belinda Carlisle: "In Too Deep"; music Sleeper: "Nice Guy Eddie"; Milton Jones: music Honeycrack: Sol Campbell: Stevie Starr: Regurgitation act
6	Lee Hurst	60 mins	6 July 1996
* Details incomplete: Lee Hurst: Introduction; Tony Hawks: Mission Controller; Leslie Grantham: Mission Impossible briefing for Lee; Tony Hawks, Lee Hurst: Lee runs across London; music The Divine Comedy: Something For The Weekend; Harry Hill: A rabbit-skin coat; Tim Vine: Ballcock; Terry Alderton: music Manic Street Preachers: "Everything Must Go"; music Galliano: John Thomson: Armstrong and Miller: Niall Ashdown: Tony Hawks, Lee Hurst, and Simon Pegg: Detonate our little victim
7	Lee Hurst	60 mins	13 July 1996
* Details incomplete: Lee Hurst: Introduction; Harry Hill: music Mark Morrison: Johnny Ball: Fred Housego: music Bryan Adams:
8	Lee Hurst	60 mins	20 July 1996
* Details incomplete: Lee Hurst: Introduction; Harry Hill: Armstrong and Miller: music Alison Limerick: music Dodgy: Simon Pegg: Stuart St. Paul: Jim Rosenthal: Jeff Green: Andy Parsons and Henry Naylor: music Squeeze: "This Summer"

=== Saturday Live Again! ===
One-off 2007 special.

Show	Host	Air Time	Original release date
—	Marcus Brigstocke	90 mins	1 December 2007
* Details incomplete: Marcus Brigstocke: Intro and stand-up; Jimmy Carr: Stand-up; Jo Caulfield: Stand-up; Jeremy Lion: Stand-up; Justin Edwards: Stand-up; Ben Elton: Stand-up; Jocelyn Jee Esien: Jiffy the traffic warden (character) and Myleene Klass; Pete Firman: Magic act; music Hard Fi: Television; Veniamin: The Human Slinky; Lee Mack: Stand-up; Mitchell and Webb: Greg Davies, Steve Hall, Marek Larwood: We Are Klang perform the erotic masterpiece "Emile"; music Bon Jovi:

=== Friday Night Live (Channel 4's 40th anniversary show) ===
A one-off show commissioned to celebrate 40 years of Channel 4 which began broadcasting in November 1982.

Show	Host	Air Time	Original release date
—	Ben Elton	95 mins	21 October 2022
Ben Elton, Stephen Fry, Jennifer Saunders, Ade Edmondson, Dawn French: Ben gets messages from the old gang before the show; Ben Elton: Stand-up – A great time to be doing a little bit of politics; music Mawaan Rizwan: "Are You Checking Me Out?"; Julian Clary: Stand-up – I'm very left wing; Ronni Ancona: Olivia Colman (impression) pretending to be ordinary; Rosie Jones: Stand-up; Kayvan Novak: Fonejacker (character) – Gym membership.. Talk to me; Ronni Ancona: Olivia Colman (impression) – Intermission; Leo Reich: Stand-up; Harry Enfield: Stavros (character) – Completely lost my Greek ax init; Thanyia Moore, Michael Odewale: The news you might have missed; Jo Brand: Stand-up; music Self Esteem: "Fucking Wizardry"; Martha Howe-Douglas: (impression) The Rebekah Vardy Appeal; Sam Campbell: Stand-up; music Jordan Gray: "Better Than You"; Harry Enfield: Loadsamoney (character) – Have you missed me?; Ben Elton: Stand-up – You can't say anything anymore
