= Rik and Ade =

English comedy duo

- Born: Richard Michael Mayall: 7 March 1958, Harlow, Essex, England; Adrian Charles Edmondson: 24 January 1957, Bradford, West Yorkshire, England
- Died: Richard Michael Mayall: 9 June 2014 (aged 56), Barnes, London, England
- Notable work: The Dangerous Brothers, The Comic Strip Presents... (Bad News and Mr. Jolly Lives Next Door), The Young Ones, Filthy Rich and Catflap, Bottom (Bottom Live and Guest House Paradiso)

Comedy career
- Years active: 1975–2003; 2011–2012
- Medium: Television, film, theatre, album
- Genre: Comedy

Rik and Ade were a British comic double act composed of Rik Mayall and Adrian Edmondson. They were particularly popular in the 1980s and 1990s, often specialising in slapstick.

== Collaboration ==
Mayall and Edmonson both studied drama at the Victoria University of Manchester, starting the same year; Edmonson recounts in his autobiography that they met on their first day but kept different social circles in their first year. In their second year, Mayall and Edmondson collaborated as part of the five-person comedy troupe 20th Century Coyote, which initially did variety performances at a local pub, Band on the Wall. The five performed at the Edinburgh Fringe Festival in 1977, and after this the other three members left. Following the other members' departure, Edmondson and Mayall would begin working together as a double act and socialise together closely.

They left university in 1978 before moving to different towns, initially failing to find many outlets for performance. In 1979 they moved to London and booked an independent tour for their double act, which earned them an offer of residency at a venue in Woolwich.

They became known for their stage act The Dangerous Brothers in 1981 which they performed at London's The Comedy Store. They later reprised their Dangerous Brothers performance for Channel 4's Saturday Live in 1986. Beginning with The Dangerous Brothers, Mayall and Edmondson frequently revolved their comedic acts around slapstick, with their characters often engaging in cartoonish violence with one another for comedic effect.

The two later joined the comedy group The Comic Strip, featuring fellow double acts Jennifer Saunders (who Edmondson would later marry) and Dawn French, Peter Richardson and Nigel Planer, and comedian Alexei Sayle, and starred in several projects related to it, such as the parody music group Bad News and the 1988 film Mr. Jolly Lives Next Door.

Mayall and Edmondson went on to achieve fame with the 1982 BBC2 sitcom The Young Ones, starring Mayall as Rick and Edmondson as Vyvyan Basterd, alongside Planer as Neil Pye and Christopher Ryan as Mike the Cool Person. Following the series conclusion in 1984, Mayall and Edmondson worked briefly on the 1987 BBC2 sitcom Filthy Rich and Catflap, before going on to perform on the West End in a production of Samuel Becket's Waiting for Godot in 1991. That same year they starred in the BBC2 sitcom Bottom, starring Mayall and Edmondson in the roles of Richard Richard and Eddie Hitler, respectively.

=== Dissolution of partnership ===
Bottom ran until 1995, after the BBC declined further series, but it continued offscreen with five Bottom Live stage shows, and acted as the basis for the spinoff film Guest House Paradiso, released in 1999. Following the Bottom Live 2003: Weapons Grade Y-Fronts Tour, Edmondson announced the end to their collaboration, citing age as the reason for their breakup. Mayall and Edmondson briefly reunited for Comic Relief's Let's Sing and Dance 2011 series, and to work on a revival of Bottom for the BBC, based off their third Bottom Live stage show Hooligan's Island. Due to personal conflict arising during the writing process for Hooligan's Island, the revival was cancelled in 2012, and they once again ended their collaboration.

== Death of Mayall ==
Mayall died in 2014 from a heart attack. Edmondson paid tribute to his comedic partner through various means in the succeeding years, calling Mayall a "genius" and regretting his inability to end their partnership on better terms while he was still alive.
