= List of Bottom characters =

The British sitcom Bottom first aired on BBC2 over three series from 1991 to 1995 and starred Rik Mayall and Adrian Edmondson as the two main characters, Richard Richard and Edward Elizabeth Hitler. It also featured an extensive supporting cast of recurring and minor characters.

== Eddie & Richie ==
Edward 'Eddie' Elizabeth Hitler (Adrian Edmondson) is a free-spirited and menacing alcoholic. He wears glasses akin to those of Eric Morecambe, a worn out brown suit and a white shirt with a black spotted tie. Despite having a shaven head, he sports sideburns. He also has a brown trilby hat and a tweed coat. Eddie has two other friends, losers named Spudgun and Dave Hedgehog who mostly hang out together, though Dave is also a family man. (His wife Susan is never seen, but his daughter Doreen appeared once in the episode "Terror".) While Richie does not appear to have any other friends besides Eddie, he does get along with Spudgun and Dave Hedgehog if in need of company. Eddie is also revealed to be a Queens Park Rangers fan: in the episode "Holy", he sprayed the letters 'QPR' on the wall with spray snow; and in "Dough", there are QPR banners on his bedroom wall. He has been shown to break the fourth wall a few times in the series when looking at or speaking directly to the audience. Oddly enough, some of the men in Eddie's family have girls' names, as his middle name is Elizabeth and he once referred to having a 'Great Uncle Susan' who fought "on both sides, depending on which way he was facing" during the first world war. Eddie is shown to have quite varying degrees of mechanical expertise, for instance he is able to build a fully functioning printing press within a week and a treadmill powered by a motorbike in a matter of hours, yet it takes him an entire year to set up a domestic VHS recorder.

More of Eddie's and Richie's relatives are often mentioned. Such as Richie's grandfather who was at the Battle of the Somme, while Eddie's uncle used to work in a prison, but really a prisoner peeling potatoes, sewing mailbags and doing ... "anything they told him to do". Richie's wealthy aunt Olga left him a small sum of money in her will, whilst his other aunt Mabel used to own the flat. Richie's father, Oswald Richard, was an acquaintance of Eddie. According to Richie, his father moved in mysterious circles, because he had one leg shorter than the other. Richie's sister lives near Hammersmith and apparently looks just like her brother, albeit 'with smaller jugs'. Eddie's mother was a wrestler named 'Adolf', who abandoned him when he was young, leaving him her old service revolver and a note saying 'Please look after my baby, I can't be bothered.' Given the unusual naming traditions of the Hitler family it is possible male children are given female middle names while females have male middle names. In Guest House Paradiso, he goes by the name Eddie Ndingombaba.

Richard 'Richie' Richard (Rik Mayall) is a deluded optimist and camp slob. His character is elitist and arrogant albeit manic and lacking in any social grace. Richie usually wears a white shirt he says is an original Van der Haasusen that Eddie remarks hasn't been washed since 1963. Said shirt is tucked into his Y-fronts and vintage dark green tie with tie clip, blue jeans with a belt that clearly misses most of the loops and has a light jade raincoat when outdoors. He also occasionally wears brown trousers held up with braces, a red tie and he also wears white and pink striped pyjamas.

Richie is a virgin, and Eddie stole Richie's only ever 'girlfriend', Ethel Cardew, and sometimes mocks Richie with how he had sex with her. In the episode "Digger", Richie almost has sex with a foreign countess, Lady Natasha Letitia Sarah Jane Wellesley Obstromsky Ponsonsky Smythe Smythe Smythe Smythe Smythe Oblomov Boblomov Dob, after he and Eddie join a dating agency. Natasha agrees to marry Richie, much to his shock and enthusiasm, and he is oblivious to the fact that she is marrying him because she thinks he is a millionaire and she has lost her entire fortune. Towards the end of the episode, Richie moves in to have sex with Lady Natasha, but unfortunately he becomes so nervous that he has a heart attack and is rushed to hospital. Whilst inside the ambulance, Eddie claims to have had sex with Lady Natasha. Eddie also informs Richie that it was not his heart that gave way but it was a result of his dodgy surgery to remove his kidney.

Richie possesses a domestic characteristic as he wears a blue and pink rimmed apron whenever he is doing housework such as cooking and ironing. His slow-wit makes him unsure of the decade, claiming, in the episode "Carnival", that it is both the 80s and then 70s later on with a bemused Eddie looking to the camera, after Richie mentions it is the 80s after all. Despite what has been said in some episodes, Richie quite often demonstrates strong religious beliefs; when an issue threatening him should come up one of the first things he does is pray and attempts to make a deal with God. He also believes that the dictionary was written by Jesus. In the episode "Terror" along with Spudgun (Steve O'Donnell), Dave Hedgehog (Christopher Ryan) and Eddie, Richie also prayed to the Devil in the hope of raising him so that he could get his wishes granted. However, despite Richie's negative traits, he has been shown to be genial and more generous with money than Eddie; while Eddie constantly swindles Richie out of money at every opportunity he can, when Richie wanted to form a relationship with the queen he said he would split the money between himself, the queen and Eddie. Also before a suicide attempt Richie genuinely thanked Eddie for being his friend. Throughout the series Richie displays occasional elements of anxiety such as in the episode "Break", he insists on sitting in silence staring at a clock waiting for his and Eddie's holiday to start despite their coach not being scheduled to arrive for another seven hours. In Guest House Paradiso, he goes by the name Richard Twat, which he insists is pronounced "Thwaite".

=== Character analysis ===
Despite sharing a mutual dislike, Richie and Eddie are eternally entwined together due to their basic flaws and they seem to have an unspoken care and need for each other as a result, having been friends for 25 years. Both have called each other best friends and Richie has referred to them as "the guys!" on more than one occasion. Richie tolerates Eddie's drunken behaviour and likewise Eddie tolerates Richie's pompous attitude. Eddie's alcoholism and violent nature mean that he has not been able to hold down a steady job since his very short-lived career as a 'bunny girl' back in 1978 that lasted ten minutes and it is unlikely that any landlord would grant him tenancy, even if he could afford the rent. He therefore relies heavily upon Richie's charity. On the other hand, Richie can be very presumptuous and is constantly libidinous, and without Eddie he is unlikely to ever make another friend. The two have an unspoken acceptance of their interdependence and their relationship tends to fluctuate between acting like a married couple from filling in the crossword together and a mother and son relationship with Richie putting an unconscious, drunken Eddie to bed every night. Both Richie and Eddie have died in numerous episodes, only to resurface unharmed the following episode.

Richie becomes overly excited at the prospect of anything good happening and by comparison, Eddie is quite grounded in himself at least when he is sober. There is some debate over who is the most intelligent of the two. Richie considers Eddie 'the stupid one', however, Eddie appears to have quite good general knowledge. He can play chess and spends several hours trying unsuccessfully, to teach Richie. Also Eddie appears to have a greater knowledge of popular culture and the arts than Richie, as he knows a fair amount about Napoleon and Wellington (who Richie claims invented the Chelsea Boot), and also appears well versed in the works of Vivaldi (whom Richie believes to be a football player). However, Richie is usually quick to spot the flaws in Eddie's latest schemes, such as when he noticed how terribly unconvincing his forged money looked in the episode "Dough". Also Richie can read, whereas Eddie rarely spells words correctly including his own name. Another example was the word 'scythe', when Richie pointed it out to him in the dictionary he thought it spelt the word 'zither' and he was also unaware of what a debt was. Both Richie and Eddie frequently use double-entendres either purposely as a joke or it is misinterpreted by the other.

The arguments between Richie and Eddie often lead to exaggerated and destructive fight scenes. Some have likened this to a live action cartoon. However, the boisterousness is somewhat more graphic: examples include heads slammed in and under refrigerators; hands stapled to tables; legs being chainsawed off; genitalia slammed in doors or set on fire; fingers cut off; televisions smashed over heads; darts, forks, or fingers ending up in eyes; faces shoved in camp fires; legs broken or teeth knocked out. Some of the visual effects used for these events are very realistic, whereas others are deliberately fake. All are accompanied by a variety of over-the-top sound effects. The BBFC has given the Bottom: The Complete Series DVD a classification of 15, with a violence rating of 'None'.

Both Richie and Eddie share many of the qualities that their Young Ones characters Rick and Vyvyan possess. The fights that Richie and Eddie have are not dissimilar to the ones Rick and Vyvyan have. Eddie has a violent nature that Vyvyan strongly possesses, and Richie like Rick believes himself to be more popular and intelligent than he really is. Although Vyvyan is not a heavy alcoholic like Eddie is, he appears to be the only one of the Young Ones who enjoys alcohol. His favourite drink being either vodka or babycham. Certain jokes that appeared in the Young Ones have also appeared in Bottom on a couple of occasions; for example, in the Young Ones episode "Oil", Vyvyan hit Rick in the crotch with a cricket bat to which Rick replied "Ha! Ha! Missed both my legs!" Eddie does the same thing to Richie who responds with the same line in the first and second of the Bottom Live performances. Eddie has on more than one occasion mocked Richie for being a virgin, and throughout most of the Young Ones episode "Time", Vyvyan taunted Rick for being a virgin to which Rick repeatedly denies. However, both Eddie and Vyvyan are believed to be virgins too. In the Bottom episode "Terror", Eddie believed that the Devil drinks virgins' blood, but immediately after he said this he looked worried. In the Young Ones episode "Nasty", a vampire was loose in the students' house and Vyvyan smugly stated that he was not worried because he believed that vampires only attack virgins. However, only moments after he said this he muttered under his breath that he hoped "snogging with SPG counts". Another similarity between Eddie and Vyvyan is that neither of them know who their biological fathers are. In the final Bottom Live performance, while they are travelling through their time machine, Richie suggests doing some old material and impersonates Rick. Eddie obliges to this and takes on Vyvyan's persona to which Richie joked that Eddie has not changed his material very much.

== Recurring characters ==
- Richard "Dick" Head (Lee Cornes): The landlord of the Lamb and Flag, Richie and Eddie's regular pub. Dick gets on well with neither Richie nor Eddie, because of the arguments over their tabs and payments for alcohol. He is ignorant of his own field, pronouncing the 'd' in Pernod, yet he can be sneaky at times when he takes advantage of losers Richie, Eddie and their friends. His appearances were in "Smells", "Parade" and "Dough".
- Spudgun (Steve O'Donnell): One of Eddie's slobbish and unemployable friends. His nickname comes from a trick he can do involving a potato, although according to Eddie it's not something most people would want to see.
- Dave Hedgehog (Christopher Ryan): One of Eddie's friends. While "Hedgehog" appears to be his actual surname, he also can do a trick involving an actual hedgehog. As seen in "Terror", he is married, and has a daughter by the name of Doreen - who is remarkably calm when dealing with Richie and Eddie, despite them mistaking her for Satan. Dave's wife's name is Susan as mentioned in "Holy", although it takes him a while to recall her name.
- Mr. Harrison (Roger Sloman): Richie and Eddie's flat landlord and shopkeeper. His only appearances were in "'s Up" and "Holy". In the latter episode, Harrison is shown to have a daughter named Valerie and a grandson named Johnny.

== Minor and one-off characters ==
- Lily Linneker (Lisa Maxwell): Appeared in "Digger" series 2, episode 1. Runs the Lily Linneker's Love Bureau.
- John Cooper (aka “Mr 55p”) (Michael Redfern): Appeared in the episode "'S Up". John Cooper comes into Mr. Harrison's shop (which Richie and Eddie are minding) to collect his newspaper.
- Veronica Head (Julia Sawalha): The beautiful young barmaid at the Lamb and Flag, whom Richie tries to woo by boasting of his false adventures during the Falklands War. She later turns out to be the niece of Dick Head and has been conspiring against Richie, Eddie and all the other freeloaders from the start. She only appeared in the episode Parade. Also appeared in a deleted scene in "Digger", but as an assistant to Lily Lineker.
- Lady Natasha Letitia Sarah Jane Wellesley Obstromsky Ponsonsky Smythe Smythe Smythe Smythe Smythe Smythe Oblomov Boblomov Dob, Third Viscountess of Moldavia (Helen Lederer): A foreign countess Richie met through Lily Linneker's Love Bureau. Richie posed as the Duke of Kidderminster to secure a date with her. She agreed to marry him and unwittingly admitted that she'd lost her entire fortune in a civil war and had to marry soon lest she be penniless forever. She appears in the episode Digger, The actress Helen Lederer also briefly appears as a nurse in the episode Apocalypse.
- Mr. N. Stiles (Robert Llewellyn): N. Stiles is a Falklands ex-serviceman who was in the Lamb and Flag, asking questions to Richie about his false adventures in the Falklands. When Richie and Eddie discover he has a valuable wooden leg they decide to steal it and take to the pawn shop to bet on a horse. He appears in Parade.
- Mrs. Gascigne (Kelly Hunter): a "Do-gooder" who shows up at the door of Richie and Eddie's flat collecting money for victims of domestic violence in "Digger". Eddie takes the money she has collected and a piece of her coat, before hitting her over the head with a wooden hammer sending her down the stairs.
- Lil Potato (Patsy Rowlands): Spudgun's mother. Appears in Parade. She leads her son and Dave Hedgehog the freeloading racket with the identity parade lineup.
- Brenda the Ball Gazer (Liz Smith): A fortune-teller seen in Apocalypse who tells Richie he is going to die.
- "Skullcrusher" Henderson (Nick Scott): He is one of Dick's friends and the most prolific currency forger in London, although this is more down to his tendency to crush the skulls of any rivals than the quality of his forgeries (which feature Danny La Rue in place of the Queen). Appeared in Dough.
- "Cannonball" Taffy O'Jones (voiced by Kevin Allen): Insane Welsh cricketer. After a deliberate bowl to Richie's forehead with a slingshot, Richie and Eddie decide to steal both Taffy's car and honeymoon. He never appears on-screen, but is heard off-camera sporting a heavy Welsh accent in Finger.
- Harry The Bastard/Ted Nugent (Brian Croucher): Mean spirited pawnbroker who knowingly and brazenly offers prices for items proffered at well below their true worth. He appears in Parade. Another character named "Harry the Bastard" had appeared in Mayall and Edmondson's The Young Ones, played by Alexei Sayle.
- Mr Tent (Rupert Bates): A streaker who stalked Richie and Eddie while camping out in Wimbledon Common, in 'S Out.
- Video Repair Man (uncredited): Makes a brief appearance in Carnival after Eddie blows up a VCR he took almost a year to set up. After repairing the machine, Eddie offers him a box of Malibu in lieu of cash, only to send him flying down the stairs and possibly injuring him by pulling a lever.
- Gas Man (Mark Lambert): Appears in Gas in which he visits Richie and Eddie's flat to read their gas meter only to find the reading is all zeros, as they have been stealing gas from their next door neighbour Mr Rottweiler. Because Rottweiler is up next, Richie and Eddie decide to keep the Gas Man in the flat until his time to clock off for the night arrives, knocking him out with a frying pan as he tries to leave.
- Mr. Rottweiler (Brian Glover): Richie and Eddie's violent neighbour who appears in Gas. Richie and Eddie were stealing gas from Rottweiler with an illegal gas link. In an attempt to disconnect it they smashed his wall down while he is asleep with his girlfriend.
- Doreen Hedgehog (Lisa Coleman): Appears in Terror. Doreen is Dave's daughter who comes to the flat to collect her father. She is mistaken for The Devil by the others due to wearing a devil mask.
- Valerie Bates: Mr. Harrison's daughter, appearing in Holy. After her mother has a heart attack on Christmas Day, she leaves her son Johnny with her father, but he ends up on Richie and Eddie's doorstep causing them, Dave Hedgehog and Spudgun into thinking he's the son of God. After returning, Valerie sees that Johnny is hungry and prepares to breastfeed him in the flat by unbuttoning her top, much to Richie and Eddie's delight.
- Johnny Bates: Mr. Harrison's baby grandson, appearing in Holy. Mr. Harrison leaves him on Richie and Eddie's doorstep for them to look after. After finding him, Richie, Eddie, Dave Hedgehog and Spudgun mistake Johnny for being the son of God.
- Tight-Mouthed Larry (Chris Langham): Dick Head's Bookmaker who appears in Parade. He came out of the men's lavatory sick and drunk and seems to accidentally give away his tip about Sad Ken to Richie, Eddie and the whole pub. Later he reappears with Dick and revealing the tip was scam and conspiring with Veronica and her uncle for the money that the freeloaders didn't pay for their drinks.
- Chief Inspector Grobbelaar (Andy de la Tour): appearing in Parade. He's the head of the police station and in charge with the identity parade. When he enters the lineup room, Richie mistakes Grobbelaar for a witness, and again for someone else in the men's lavatory where Richie and Eddie assault him for money placing.
- Mr Wormwood (Rupert Bates): A burglar who knocks out Richie and Eddie in Burglary.
- Mr Scrubbs (Paul Bradley): A burglar who gets captured by Richie and Eddie in Burglary.
- P C V Jones (Jonathan Stratt): A policeman who comes to visit Richie and Eddie following Richie’s unusual phone-call in Burglary.
- Boris (Mark Williams): Party guest who defends his girlfriend and comes up with the idea to give Richie ‘the bumps’ in Accident.
- Willy (David Lloyd): Party guest who Richie flicks in the crotch in Accident.
- Shooting Gallery stall owner (Mark Arden): Runs the stall at the fair where Eddie ends up shooting him in the eye in Apocalypse.
- Sir Roger Cobham OBE (Roger Brierley): World famous heart surgeon who gives a paranoid Richie a clean bill of health in Apocalypse.
- Nurse (Helen Lederer): Working on the desk at the hospital and doesn’t fall for Richie’s attempts to scam a doctors appointment in Apocalypse.

== Unseen characters ==
- Nurse: Mentioned by profession instead of name in “Accident”. She attacked Richie with a kidney dish after asking her if she’s seen The Singing Detective.
- Pub patron: Heard but not seen. When Richie’s pub quiz team “Hammersmith” are struggling with a question, Richie goes to the toilet to find an encyclopaedia he locked into a cubicle, with “OUT OF ORDER” on the door, only for the unnamed Patron to use the pages as “Posh Toilet Paper”, much to Richie’s annoyance, resulting in him attacking the patron and losing. Heard in “Dough” and uncredited.
- Ethel Cardew: Ethel Cardew is a woman (implied in Terror to be transsexual) that both Eddie and Richie frequently mention in their conversations. Richie has tried to woo her unsuccessfully (by one occasion pretending to be the captain of The Ark Royal, only for her to walk away with the arresting officer), deluding himself into believing that she was his fiancée, though it seemed that she preferred Eddie over Richie and slept with him during a trip to France, leaving Richie rather unsettled whenever the topic is brought up. However, it would appear that Eddie and Ethel are no longer on speaking terms, due to the events only described as the "superglue incident".
- Keith and Deirdre McFrenzy: Deirdre and "One-legged mad dog" Keith McFrenzy are from the Lamb and Flag's Nudy Mud wrestling team. Both have disabilities with Keith being a one legged amputee, whilst Deirdre is blind. Keith has been chasing Eddie for 17 years as the latter owes him money.
- Ted "Unlucky Suicide" McGloomy
- Mad Quentin "Trousers Down Pervy" O'Blimey
- Harry "I'll Do Anything For Half A Pint" Grundy: Mentioned in “Digger” as a friend of Richie and Eddie’s who has their potato masher still stuck inside him, which the doctors couldn’t remove causing Richie to use Eddie’s head to mash them with instead, resulting in “Squashed Potatoes”.
- "Mad Dog" Patrick "D'you Want Some Of This" O'Fist
- "Dodgy" Bob McMayday: said by Eddie to be "the most violent travel agent in the world".
- Tubbs Lardy: Mentioned in "'s Up" Richie and Eddie's friend who's cause a shocking mess of the collapsed fire escape, when he won the bet that it wouldn't hold his weight and crushed the dust bin with the cat inside it.
- Aunt Irama
- Susan Hedgehog: Mentioned in "Holy" and referenced in Terror is Dave's wife and Doreen's mother.
- Fatty Amal: Owner of the take away kebab shop opposite the flat. He is first mentioned in "Gas" where after supposedly killing a gas man, Richie phones Amal and attempts to give the gas man's body to him for meat, only for Amal to reply that his Alsatian had got run over that morning so he was fine for meat for the rest of the week. He is mentioned for the second and final time in "Carnival" where he petrol bombs his own shop during riots after taking an insurance policy on it the day before.
- Adolf Hitler: mentioned in “Digger” as Eddie's mother.
- Richie's parents: Richie's mother, never mentioned by name and possibly deceased, is said to have used to make sandwiches for the Hammersmith Conservative Association, although only one person seemed to have eaten them in Hole. Richie's father, named as Oswald Richard in "Break", was hit by an air raid warden during the blitz for not turning out his light, resulting in a fight he lost. One night when he was drunk, he went into the ladies room by mistake, where he met the woman who would become Richie's mother. He is described as having one leg shorter than the other. Richie seemingly inherited his father's copy of German Luftwaffe Air force Exercises that was signed by Adolf Hitler.
- Hotel Land Lady: Never mentioned by name, but was described by Richie and Eddie in “Break”. The year before the events of the episode, she asked if Eddie knew anything about gas leaks while they were staying in a hotel in an unnamed location, only for Eddie to start off a lighter, which caused an explosion at the hotel, which killed the Land Lady in the process. Her last words were “Oh, Mr Hitler? do you know anything about gas leaks?”. Richie describes her as “A sweetheart”.
- Doctor Wildthroat: Mentioned by Richie in "Break" after Eddie suggests that they should get jabs for their trip to Doncaster and Bridlington. After Richie suggested that they should see him for a booster, Eddie says that he gave them rabies the year before, suggesting that he is actually a vet.
- Slip Digby: Possibly an organist, although "that's not what they called him in court." In Hole he is announced as the winner of the Hammersmith Bugle's Stork Margarine competition, claiming victory with the slogan "I like Stork Margarine because I've only got one leg."
- Terry Hardacre: A past friend of Richie's who once sent him a Birthday card with a joke inside which was a poem that read "Congratulations its your Birthday, it's time for lots of fun! So roll this card up nice and tight and stick it up your bum!" Despite the card being from a previous year, Richie still sends it to himself every year passing it off as current alongside many other forgeries, much to Eddie's annoyance and already knowing the joke and card being from the previous year. Mentioned in "Accident".
