= Asylum (1996 TV series) =

British comedy television series

- Asylum title screen
- Created by: Edgar Wright
- Written by: Edgar Wright; David Walliams; Julian Barratt; Simon Pegg; Jessica Stevenson; Norman Lovett
- Directed by: Edgar Wright
- Starring: Julian Barratt; Simon Pegg; Jessica Stevenson; Norman Lovett
- No. of series: 1
- No. of episodes: 6

Production
- Running time: 30 minutes

Original release
- Network: Paramount Comedy Channel

Asylum is a British comedy series which was shown on Paramount Comedy Channel in 1996. Set in a mental asylum, it was directed by Edgar Wright. It was co-written by Edgar Wright, David Walliams, Julian Barratt, Adam Bloom, Jessica Hynes, Simon Pegg, Norman Lovett, Paul Morocco, and Mick O'Connor.

Asylum ran for one series of six episodes. Unlike traditional sitcoms or comedy television shows, it was to some extent an opportunity for stand-up routines by various comedians, mixed with an overall story involving much black humour. It is significant for involving a large number of British comedians, many of whom went on to work on some of the most successful comedy programmes of the 2000s. It marked the first collaboration of Edgar Wright, Simon Pegg and Jessica Stevenson, who would go on to make cult sitcom Spaced and Shaun of the Dead. Many of the characters names were the same as those of the actors who portrayed them.

David Devant & His Spirit Wife were the "house band" for the series, performing segments in every episode, from their first album, Work, Lovelife, Miscellaneous. The lead-in track "Ginger" served as the programme's title music.

The series has yet to be released on DVD.

== Cast and crew ==
Written by the cast and

- Co-writer & director – Edgar Wright
- Co-writer – David Walliams

Principal cast and characters

- Norman Lovett as Dr Lovett
- Simon Pegg as Simon
- Jessica Hynes as Martha & Nurse McFadden
- Julian Barratt as Julian/Victor Munro
- Paul Morocco as Paul
- Adam Bloom as Adam
- Mick O'Connor as Nobby Shanks

Guest stars

- Paul Tonkinson
- John Moloney
- Bill Bailey
- Howard Haigh
- Andy Parsons
- Henry Naylor
- David Walliams
