= 20th Century Coyote =

English Comedy Group

20th Century Coyote was an English comedy group noted for first uniting Adrian Edmondson and Rik Mayall. Formed by Lloyd Peters in March 1976 whilst studying B.A. Drama at Manchester University, this improvisatory character-led comedy troupe was to become the resident company at the Band on the Wall music venue in Manchester. Peters recruited fellow drama student Rik Mayall principally because they shared the same off-beat humour – anarchic slapstick mixed with a large dose of Monty Python's Flying Circus. Two further drama students were recruited from the year below, and, in October 1976, Adrian Edmondson joined, to appear in Coyote's first improv-based comedy entitled "Dead Funny" (1976). Six other shows followed before an Edinburgh Festival Fringe spin-off. The 40-minute live shows were self-contained narratives based on standard comedy templates, modified by improvisation and re-improvised in performance. The shows were often loud, crude and grotesque. The group was important in that its techniques and the lasting influence of character-led sketch and "improv" comedy helped shape a distinctive brand of "alternative comedy" in the 1970s and 1980s that would come to dominate the comedy mainstream.

Mayall asked Edmondson if he would be interested in joining. Mayall recalls: "he had a bit of a reputation in our year as the actor". Edmondson's reply was: "well, I'll have to have a contract, luv". Mayall wrote out a contract during the seminar saying: "I promise it will be horrible and nothing will ever go right. La de da. Rik Mayall".

Although the group initially had five members, by the time "20th Century Coyote" began appearing at The Comedy Store in London, it had become a double act with just Edmondson and Mayall. This double act became something of a blueprint for their later careers, with slapstick violence, crude humour and eccentric characters. As The Comedy Store and "20th Century Coyote" grew in popularity, Edmondson and Mayall broke away, along with Alexei Sayle, "The Outer Limits", French and Saunders, and Arnold Brown to set up their own comedy club, The Comic Strip. Here, still working as "20th Century Coyote", Edmondson and Mayall gained the attention of television producers and went on to work on The Comic Strip Presents... and The Young Ones.

Although Edmondson and Mayall did not subsequently use the title "20th Century Coyote" for their partnership, its style was reflected heavily in The Young Ones and Bottom. In the mid-1980s, Edmondson and Mayall appeared in Saturday Live with a similar act under the title "The Dangerous Brothers". Rik starred in Lloyd Peters' BBC Radio 4 comedy-drama 'A Higher Education' (2000, repeated regularly) where he plays 'Don Crookfield' the Head of a failing University Performance Department.
