= Arnold Brown (comedian) =

Scottish comedian (born 1936)

Arnold Brown (born 27 December 1936, in Glasgow) is a Scottish Jewish comedian, one of the main figures in the alternative comedy scene of the early 1980s.

== Life and career ==
Originally an accountant, Brown worked hard at live standup, until he found a knack for presenting observational comedy in a slow, meandering but entertaining style. He won the Edinburgh Festival Perrier Award in 1987. His catchphrase is "And why not?"

He quotes the highlight of his career as supporting Frank Sinatra on stage in Glasgow's Ibrox Park.

He can be seen on: the original Julien Temple film The Comic Strip (1981), performing live on stage; the Bill Forsyth film Comfort and Joy in which he plays a psychiatrist in a manner reminiscent of his stand-up style; The Comic Strip television series (1982 onwards) in various roles; The Young Ones in various roles; and in The Dangerous Brothers (1985).

He appeared as himself in the 1994 partially-improvised comedy film There's No Business..., starring the comedy duos Raw Sex (Simon Brint and Rowland Rivron) and The Oblivion Boys. He has appeared in Stewart Lee's Comedy Vehicle in various roles; and in "Torture" (from Saturday Live) as a man who has experienced Chinese water torture. Also in 1994, Methuen published his book, Are You Looking at Me, Jimmy?.

Brown featured in 2012 in two Random Acts films on Channel 4 called "Where is the Fish That Never Swam?" and "The Alleyway of a Thousand Questions", directed by Jes Benstock. His DVD, Jokes I Have Known was produced and released by Go Faster Stripe in the same year.

In 2008, he performed at the Edinburgh Festival Fringe in a show called Happiness: The Search Continues with Ian Macpherson. He appeared on KT Tunstall's documentary about Ivor Cutler in 2020, speaking about Cutler but also about Jewish life in Glasgow. In the same year, he was mentioned by Lenny Henry on Louis Theroux's Grounded podcast as an act who commendably does not resort to sexist or racist material.

Arnold Brown was awarded a Lifetime Achievement Award at the Scottish Comedy Awards in April 2014.

The University of Kent Special Collections & Archives holds a collection of Arnold Brown's material relating to his comedy career. It includes promotional material, audio recordings, press coverage and photographs.

== See also ==
- Arnold Brown and Company
