= Arnold Brown and Company =

Arnold Brown and Company was a short-lived radio program that was broadcast from October 1989 to August 1990. There were 12 half-hour episodes and it was broadcast on BBC Radio 4. It starred Arnold Brown, Chris Campbell, David Charles, Emma Clarke and Judy Hawkins.

== Notes and references ==
Lavalie, John. Arnold Brown and Company. EpGuides. 21 Jul 2005. 29 Jul 2005 <https://web.archive.org/web/20070814152531/http://www.epguides.com/ArnoldBrownandCompany/%3E.
