= Kay Clark =

- Saturday Live; The Tracey Ullman Show; Tracey Takes On...; Tracey Ullman's Show; character
- First appearance: Saturday Live – Series 1, Episode 1
- Last appearance: Tracey Ullman’s Show – Series 2, Episode 6
- Created by: Tracey Ullman
- Portrayed by: Tracey Ullman

In-universe information
- Gender: Female
- Occupation: Paper products distribution (Note: The Tracey Ullman Show); Bank teller (Note: Tracey Takes On...); OAP (Note: Tracey Ullman's Show)
- Family: Mildred (Mother)
- Spouse: Kurt Rasmussen (deceased)
- Significant other: Derrick (Boyfriend)
- Relatives: Marjorie (Aunt); Debbie (Cousin)
- Nationality: British

Kay Clark is a fictional character created and portrayed by Tracey Ullman. She is the character Ullman has portrayed the longest, spanning over four decades and three television programmes. The character was born out of a television sketch for the British television comedy and music show Saturday Live in 1986.

== Origins ==
Ullman says that Kay is based on a woman who worked at her bank in The Midlands. "Basically, she's forty-three, has never been touched by a man and never will be. There's always one like her in every office who sells sanitary napkins and stamps, with her nice polyester ass waddling across the room. Once, at an office party, someone got her behind the filing cabinets, and he's never lived it down. People go, 'Oh, you and Kayyy - 1982....' 'Shut up! I never did nothing with her!' I love people like that."

Kay, whilst retaining many of the same personality traits, has been reconceptualized for each television programme. In The Tracey Ullman Show (1987–1990), Kay, who lives in Rhode Island in the United States, works for a paper products distribution company, a job Ullman herself once had. She talks to her invalid mother, who is neither seen nor heard, on the telephone. In Tracey Takes On... (1996–1999), Kay is employed as a bank teller in Van Nuys and lives in Panorama City in Los Angeles, California. Her invalid mother communicates with a buzzer. In Tracey Ullman's Show (2016–2018), Kay, who lives in New Malden in London, is portrayed as an old aged pensioner. Her 103-year-old mother appears on-screen for the very first time.

== Biography ==
Kay is described an eternal optimist. "Musn't crumble, Kay." She has devoted herself to caring for her invalid mother. While she loves her mother, Kay has outbursts of hatred for her from time to time, though she's quick to scold herself for such behavior.

Kay wears clothing made from polyester, along with a pen on a string which hangs around her neck. She cuts her own hair using a ceramic kitchen bowl and scissors. Kay's mode of transportation is a moped.

=== The Tracey Ullman Show ===
Kay is a Rhode Island paper distribution company office worker. Her co-workers, and even her boss, constantly taunt and play practical jokes on her. She takes it all in stride, though. She frequently checks in on her invalid mother on the phone. "Hello, Mummy, it's (draws out) Kaaaay." We never see Mother on screen nor do we ever hear her on the phone. Its revealed in the sketch "Kay Babysits" what caused her mother to become an invalid:

Once there was a little girl about your age who was told never, never to listen to the radio. Because her mother said it was the Devil’s instrument and would give her bad thoughts. And one day, she couldn’t resist, and listened to it anyway. And she heard a weather report saying that a storm was coming. Now later, her mother discovered that the radio was warm. And she asked the little if she played it. And the little girl lied. “No,” she said. Then she saw her mummy leaving the house in a summer frock. She couldn’t tell her to take an umbrella, could she? No. Because she lied. That day, her mother got caught in the storm and came down with a cold. An illness that got progressively worse overly the next thirty years until she was a completely invalid, unable to do a single bloody thing for herself. And do you know what happened to that little girl who lied? She felt so responsible that she let her mother interfere with every aspect of her life. Until that little girl dedicated her whole self of taking care of her mother.

— Kay

Kay doesn't have any friends. It's revealed that she did have a boyfriend, Derrick, in her youth.

=== Tracey Takes On... ===
Kay is presented as a 42-year-old California bank teller (and sometimes branch manager) at Van Nuys Savings and Loan. She took a work transfer from the bank she worked at in England to its American branch to take advantage of the health benefits for her mother. She lives in Panorama City. Unlike her portrayal in The Tracey Ullman Show, Kay does not face the wrath of her nasty coworkers. While her mother is not seen on screen, she is heard through a series of beeps from her bedroom. Kay's mother became an invalid after the sidecar she was traveling in broke free from the motorbike Kay's father was driving. "'I didn't know the damn motorbike would part company with the sidecar, Mildred,' he shouted over his shoulder, as he sped off up Shaftesbury Avenue." "I remember the cold, steely glint in Mother's eye as she stared up at me from her iron lung. 'Kay,' she said, 'don't ever marry. All men will try to kill you, after they've done nasty things to your downstairs areas.'" In the episode "Tracey Takes On... Death" it's revealed that Kay's father ran off with her aunt, Marjorie.

Kay has very little time for a social life thanks to work and acting as a caregiver. She's still a virgin. Attorney Sydney Kross (Ullman) talks her into marrying her prison penpal, Kurt, in an effort to spare him the death penalty. Despite the marriage, Kurt doesn't receive a stay of execution from the governor and is placed in a gas chamber right after the wedding. Kay is now, as Ullman puts it, "the virgin widow." In the series finale, "Tracey Takes On... The End of the World", Kay's mother finally dies. She now has her freedom - "Three hours and fourteen minutes of it!" she exclaims.

=== Tracey Ullman's Show ===
Kay is presented as an OAD living in New Malden with her mother, who is 103. Unlike in previous shows, Mother is not an invalid. She has had many medical procedures performed, though. For the first time in the character's television history, Mother appears on-screen (played by actress Joan Linder). It's mentioned that Kay was a year old at the time of King George VI's coronation making her nearly 80 years old in the series.

Kay is somebody I've done for many years, as you realize, because I did her on the original show in America and Americans used to like her. She's obviously a virgin who's lived with her mom, who's taught by her mom. There was a woman that was this character. She just broke my heart. She would always dress very plainly and have pics of cats at her desk. I remember and she did speak like that, "Hello! Good morning!" She used to work at a bank that I banked at when I was like twenty years old and she’s always killed me. She wore her little polyester pants and her pen around her neck. People have gotten the empathy behind it and the poignancy and the sadness. She's like a classic sort of character for me. And my daughter loves me being that character. She said, "That is you, Mom." I said, "What do you mean?" She said, "Part of your personality is Kay." So I decided to do her again. And I brought in a brilliant woman to be Mother this time. You love to laugh at her; I love this woman. She's called Joan Linder and she was in the same year at The Royal Academy of Dramatic Arts as Joan Collins. That's what Joan Collins really should look like. [Laughs] She's great, this actress. She shows up and she says, "Would you like me to take my teeth out?" We're like, "Yes. Brilliant."

— Tracey Ullman talking about Kay in Tracey Ullman's Show in 2016

In series two, during a flood, Kay and Mother take shelter in their attic. While looking for something to keep them warm, she discovers a postcard addressed to her from a man inviting her to the cinema. It is dated 1965. Mother has been keeping a variety of correspondents from her for decades: a marriage proposal, acceptance of her application to a university, a job offer, and an invitation from a group of people to join them on holiday. In episode six, Kay tracks down her cousin Debbie from Australia who is doing their family tree. Kay is overjoyed to learn that she has a large extended family. Debbie invites her to come to Australia to meet them all. Mother (worried, and obviously lying) blurts out that Kay's father was not her real father. Her real father was a sailor. Kay is heartbroken.

== Bibliography ==
- Ullman, Tracey (1998). Tracey Takes On. Hyperion. ISBN 978-0-786-86340-2.
