= Sweet Inspiration (The Inspirational Choir album) =

Studio album by The Inspirational Choir
- Released: 1985
- Studio: Livingston Recording Studios, Air Studios, Abbey Road Studios, Angel Recording Studios & CBS Studios.
- Genre: Gospel
- Label: Portrait (UK)
- Producer: Don Reedman, Jeff Jarratt

The Inspirational Choir chronology
Sweet Inspiration (1985)	Higher & Higher (1986)

Singles from Sweet Inspiration
- 1. "Abide with Me" Released: Dec 1984; 2. "I've Got a Feeling" Released: Sep 1985

Professional ratings
Review scores
Source	Rating
Cross Rhythms	8/10 stars

Sweet Inspiration is the first of two studio albums by the London gospel choir, The Inspirational Choir. It was released in 1985 and reached number 59 on the UK Album Chart and spent four weeks in the charts. Two singles were released from the album, "Abide with Me", which reached number 36 on the UK Singles Chart, and "I've Got a Feeling".

== Track listing ==
Side one
No.	Title	Length
1.	"Sweet Inspiration"	6:35
2.	"People Get Ready"	3:40
3.	"Up Where We Belong"	4:04
4.	"One Love"	3:16
5.	"Jesus Dropped the Charges"	2:25
6.	"I've Got a Feeling"	2:16

Side two
No.	Title	Length
7.	"You Light Up My Life"	3:45
8.	"Morning Has Broken"	3:06
9.	"Amazing Grace"	3:37
10.	"What a Friend We Have in Jesus"	3:07
11.	"When He Comes"	3:23
12.	"God Is"	5:35
13.	"Abide with Me"	4:55

== Personnel ==
- The Inspirational Choir – choir
- Royal Choral Society – additional choir on "Abide with Me"
- Ricky Simpson – bass guitar
- Luke Tunney, Martin Dobson, Pete Thoms, Steve Gregory – brass section
- Soloman Read – drums
- John Francis – keyboards
- Bob Carter, Phil Sawyer, Richard Gillinson, Trevor Bastow – synthesizer
- Mitch Dalton, Ronnie Simpson – guitars
- Don Reedman, Jeff Jarratt – record producer
- John Kurlander, John Timperley, Mark Chamberlain, Mark Maguire, Mike Jarratt, Mike Ross, Peter Mew – engineers
- Rosław Szaybo – album cover design
