= Bottom (TV series) =

British TV sitcom (1991–1995)

- Genre: Sitcom; Slapstick
- Created by: Adrian Edmondson; Rik Mayall
- Written by: Adrian Edmondson; Rik Mayall
- Directed by: Ed Bye; Bob Spiers
- Starring: Adrian Edmondson; Rik Mayall; Steven O'Donnell; Christopher Ryan
- Opening theme: "BB's Blues" by The Bum Notes
- Ending theme: "Last Night" by The Bum Notes
- Country of origin: United Kingdom
- Original language: English
- No. of series: 3
- No. of episodes: 18

Production
- Production locations: Studios TC1 & TC8, BBC Television Centre, London
- Camera setup: Multi-camera
- Running time: 30 minutes

Original release
- Network: BBC2
- Release: 17 September 1991 – 10 February 1995
- Release: 10 April 1995

Bottom is a British sitcom created by comedic duo Rik Mayall and Adrian Edmondson that ran for three series on BBC2 from 1991 to 1995. It focuses on Richard "Richie" Richard (Mayall) and Edward Elizabeth "Eddie" Hitler (Edmondson), two unemployed, crude flatmates living in Hammersmith, London, who aspire to better themselves. Bottom became known for its chaotic, nihilistic humour and violent slapstick comedy. In 2004, Bottom was ranked 45th in a BBC poll for Britain's Best Sitcom.

Mayall and Edmondson had worked together since the mid-1970s, and developed Bottom as an extension of their own relationship and their on-screen characters in The Young Ones and Filthy Rich & Catflap, their earlier BBC sitcoms. In addition to the series, the pair completed five stage show tours between 1993 and 2003, and adapted the sitcom into a feature-length film, Guest House Paradiso, released in 1999. A proposed spin-off series featuring various Bottom characters, Hooligan's Island, was cancelled in 2013 before production. Mayall's death in the following year ended plans for a revival.

== Cast ==
Main characters

- Adrian Edmondson as Edward "Eddie" Elizabeth Hitler. Edmondson described Eddie as "a very strange kind of mellow" version of Vyvyan from The Young Ones. He is "a man with no morals and a devious tiny-time entrepreneur".
- Rik Mayall as Richard "Richie" Richard. He is "an old-fashioned moralist, hypocrite and small-minded virgin".

Recurring characters

- Steven O'Donnell as Spudgun
- Christopher Ryan as Dave Hedgehog
- Lee Cornes as Dick Head
- Roger Sloman as Mr Harrison

== Premise ==
Eddie and Richie are two pathetic, sex-crazed, slobby flatmates living in a filthy, damp flat at 11 Mafeking Parade in Hammersmith, London. Mayall described them as "unemployed survivors". They spend their time concocting desperate schemes to convince women to have sex with them, including buying sex spray, forging money, and pretending to be aristocrats. Their plans are never successful, and the stress of their miserable lives can cause them to become irritable with each other. Whenever tensions hit a breaking point, Richie and Eddie end up fighting (albeit in a comical, Tom and Jerry-style, with adult themes). Both men are immature. Richie is a virgin; he is insecure and clueless on how to talk to women. Despite being a penniless slob, he occasionally projects a pompous sort of snobbery in an attempt to impress others and boost his self-esteem; he is sexually frustrated and obsessed with losing his virginity. Eddie, the more popular of the two, enjoys drinking regularly, and often secretly steals family heirlooms and cash from Richie, although he occasionally has inventive moments, like building a cash forger, an electric toilet, and a time machine. Eddie's friends, the gormless Spudgun and Dave Hedgehog, both fear Richie, believing him to be psychotic. Although the four of them sometimes venture out, usually to the local pub, the Lamb and Flag, most of the episodes are set within the confines of the squalid flat.

== Music ==
The opening and closing themes are cover versions of B. B. King's "BB's Blues" and The Mar-Keys' "Last Night", respectively. Both themes and the episode bridge instrumentals are played by The Bum Notes, an ensemble featuring Edmondson.

== Production ==
=== Development ===
Mayall and Edmondson first met as drama students at Manchester University in 1975, when Edmondson joined the improvisational comedy troupe 20th Century Coyote, of which Mayall was a member. The act grew in popularity following successful runs at the Edinburgh Fringe and the Comic Strip in London, which led to the pair starring in the stage and television double act The Dangerous Brothers and sitcoms The Young Ones and Filthy Rich & Catflap. After the latter ended in 1987, the pair "drifted away" for a period before reuniting after they caught the attention of producer and executive Paul Jackson, who had also worked on The Young Ones, and pitched initial ideas they had for a new sitcom. Jackson was interested enough, and Mayall and Edmondson proceeded to write a draft script. Episodes were developed around improvisational writing, and Mayall recalled Edmondson "did the typing and he allowed me to go to the off licence to buy all the drinks." Upon delivering their scripts, the BBC expressed concern that the show could not sustain itself with two characters alone, to which Mayall and Edmondson used Tony Hancock and Sid James as an example, and got their way. Mayall said that the BBC was too focused on the show's content being "morally sound and politically correct", but gave the green-light on the series.

The show's original working title was Your Bottom, for the humour of people having to say "I saw 'Your Bottom' on television last night", before it was shortened because Mayall said they "liked the shape of the word." It started as a joke until they learned that Alan Yentob, then head of BBC2, disliked the title which convinced the pair to stick with it. Mayall added that the title was deliberate to make viewers think of "bottom jokes", but that it also reflects on the show's premise of "two guys at the bottom of the heap". Mayall and Edmondson were aware of the failures of other sitcoms, and purposely wrote tight scripts. Edmondson said writing Bottom was liberating "because it's obvious what the idea is—to be as funny as possible." The pair based Eddie and Richie on characters that they had improvised with as part of 20th Century Coyote, and on their own friendship. They made a conscious effort to avoid any pop culture or contemporary references when writing, as The Young Ones had been popular with young people and instead wanted to portray characters who had left student life behind and reached their "thirties and forties". Instead, the two were interested in more everyday scenarios "that have always been there", such as a gas meter reading. Eddie and Richie have been compared to their characters on The Young Ones, but 10 years older. After the first series had been recorded, Mayall ranked Bottom as their best work and marked "a new chapter" in his relationship with Edmondson.

In June 1990, a pilot episode was recorded which was later titled "Contest" and broadcast as part of the first series. Problems over content came to light when recording began. Mayall recalled they were allowed three "bloodies" or "bloody hell"s per episode, and arguments were often had with as many as twenty BBC executives who went on the set. Some executives criticised the series for being sexist, but Mayall pointed out that they would have had more women on the show if they had not cut around twenty "shagging scenes" that were written, and argued that lesbian scenes were also removed. After the first series was recorded in June and July 1991, Bottom was first announced in August, when, in an attempt to attract viewers, the BBC reported that it had commissioned over 400 hours of new television programming for the upcoming autumn schedule. This included new productions from comics known as the Comic Strip, which included Mayall and Edmondson for Bottom and Dawn French for Murder Most Horrid.

Bottom ended after three series in February 1995. Edmondson said that one of the reasons for stopping the show was the struggle to come up with new ideas as "we'd already hit each other with everything in the flat". Mayall supported this view, saying they took the show as far as it could go on television while continuing the franchise with stage tours and home video releases, preferring to retain full creative control over the characters. In 2000, he said that Richie and Eddie had become "bigger than we are".

=== Recording ===
Each episode was recorded in front of a live audience. The original scripts can be found in the published script books, and several completely removed scenes were included in the VHS release Fluff that consisted mostly of bloopers. Several (but not all) of these scenes, as well as some smaller sections of dialogue also removed for timing reasons, are included in DVD releases.

The final episode of the second series, "'s Out", was set on Wimbledon Common involving the antics of a flasher. It was not broadcast as part of the original series after Rachel Nickell was murdered on Wimbledon Common, due to which the BBC delayed its broadcast until a rerun of the second series on 10 April 1995.

== Spin-offs ==
=== Stage shows ===
Mayall and Edmondson held five nationwide theatre tours of Bottom between 1993 and 2003, adapting the original series into a stage show. The first tour, Bottom Live, lasted 43 dates across 10 weeks in 1993. The 2001 tour consisted of 76 dates, which included a show at the National Arena in Birmingham to over 4,500 people. The Weapons Grade Y-Fronts Tour included 40 dates. The stage shows were often cruder than the sitcom with stronger language, and developed over time to include settings outside the flat, including a prison cell and a remote island. There were several instances of the pair getting carried away with the planned stunts, resulting in one of them getting cuts on their head. Edmondson said: "Rik would tell them 'Don't be scared, it happens all the time.' We'd just carry on, then go off to hospital afterwards to be sewn up." A show from each tour was recorded and released for home video.

Title	Year	Recording location
Bottom Live	1993	Southampton Mayflower Theatre
Bottom Live 2: The Big Number Two Tour	1995	Oxford New Theatre
Bottom Live 3: Hooligan's Island	1997	Bristol Hippodrome
Bottom Live 2001: An Arse Oddity	2001	Nottingham Royal Concert Hall
Bottom Live 2003: Weapons Grade Y-Fronts Tour	2003	Southend The Cliffs Pavilion

=== Guest House Paradiso ===
During the Hooligan's Island tour in 1997, Mayall and Edmondson sought ways of spending time before the night's performance and began to develop ideas for a script that involved Richie being a hotel manager. After some time the pair realised that they had produced a substantial work that would suit a feature film. The result was Guest House Paradiso, a spin-off to Bottom featuring Mayall and Edmondson as Richard Twat (pronounced "Thwaite" by the character) and Eddie Elizabeth Ndingobamba, respectively, with Edmondson serving as director. The film sees the pair operating a grotty remote guesthouse next to a nuclear power plant and feeding their guests radioactive fish, causing massive amounts of vomiting. Despite the characters and humour being in the same vein as Bottom, Mayall said the movie was never meant to be a direct film adaptation, because other sitcoms that had those "didn't work". Instead, Guest House Paradiso featured the same characters, but detached from their show counterparts, with Mayall elaborating that "there will be other films of ours with Richie and Eddie. Just like Laurel and Hardy, they set them in prisons, or the foreign legion...different stories, but the link will be Richie and Eddie." Produced on a £3 million budget, the film premiered in December 1999.

== Cancelled revivals ==
In late 2004, surrounding the release of their Mindless Violence DVD, Mayall hinted that he and Edmondson may possibly be returning with another tour in the future. However, Edmondson said that it was "definitely time to stop. We're both getting too old. We both realised that the show wasn't as engaging as it used to be. We were starting to look a bit ridiculous. ... We're both nearly fifty and we're starting to feel slightly undignified talking about wanking and knobs constantly." In 2010, Edmondson confirmed that he had quit comedy, stating that his interest in it has declined for many years, and wanted to focus more on his band. He dismissed the idea of reuniting with Mayall, saying it is "very unlikely".

In March 2011, the duo made a surprise reunion when Edmondson took part in Let's Dance for Comic Relief. A pre-recorded segment ended with Mayall hurling a custard pie in Edmondson's face. Mayall appeared again, this time live on stage, to abruptly end Edmondson's performance by hitting him several times with a frying pan. In the final, Mayall returned once again to drop a ton weight upon Edmondson. In the following month, Edmondson revealed that he and Mayall had conceived an idea for a sitcom. "Rik and I have an idea for a sitcom for when we are very, very old. We want to set it in an old people's home 30 years hence. It will be like 'Bottom', but we will be hitting each other with colostomy bags!"

In August 2012, the BBC announced that it had commissioned a series based on the Hooligan's Island stage show, where Eddie and Richie cause havoc on a deserted tropical island, set to air in 2013. However, the show was scrapped just two months later. Edmondson said "it wasn't working" and wanted to pursue other projects. Mayall tried to have Edmondson reconsider, but he "put his foot down and said, 'It's not going to work, mate", and wanted to wait ten years until they were older for a possible sitcom set in an old people's home. Mayall died on 9 June 2014, putting an end to the plans. In 2023, Edmondson revealed that he wrote the initial scripts with Mayall in the hope that the BBC would reject them. He felt Mayall was eager to revive their old characters, but struggled to accept that Edmondson was not interested. While he hoped a rejection would put Mayall's aspirations to rest, the idea was ultimately greenlit.

== Bottom: Exposed ==
In February 2024, pay television channel Gold announced Bottom: Exposed, a two-hour documentary on the making of the sitcom, featuring exclusive behind-the-scenes footage and insights from Edmondson, Paul Jackson, director/producer Ed Bye, the cast and production crew, and celebrity fans. Narrated by Stephen Fry, it aired on 18 April 2024. On the following day, Gold aired extended versions of two episodes, "Holy" and "Digger", for the first time on television. Both were previously released, the former on the series two DVD and the latter on the 1996 outtakes video Bottom Fluff.

== Episodes ==
=== Series 1 (1991) ===
No. overall	No. in season	Title	Original release date
1	1	"Smells"	17 September 1991
Richie and Eddie take advantage of a revolutionary new sex spray and head to the pub.
2	2	"Gas"	24 September 1991
After accidentally beating up the Gas Man, Richie and Eddie must remove an illegal gas pipe without disturbing their violent neighbour.
3	3	"Contest"	1 October 1991
After Eddie spends his £11.80 savings on a first-edition copy of Parade, the pair place a bet on the "Miss World" contest. (Note: This episode was originally created as the series' pilot in 1990.)
4	4	"Apocalypse"	8 October 1991
After receiving £600 from his auntie's will, Richie ends up receiving a curse from a Gypsy fortune teller.
5	5	"'s Up"	15 October 1991
Richie and Eddie are left in charge of their landlord's shop.
6	6	"Accident"	29 October 1991
Richie breaks his leg, but is determined not to let it spoil his birthday celebration.

=== Series 2 (1992) ===
No. overall	No. in season	Title	Original release date
7	1	"Digger"	1 October 1992
Richie secures a date by pretending to be an aristocrat.
8	2	"Culture"	8 October 1992
When their TV is 'taken away', Richie and Eddie desperately try to find ways to fend off boredom.
9	3	"Burglary"	15 October 1992
Richie and Eddie catch a burglar.
10	4	"Parade"	22 October 1992
Richie and Eddie get free money from an identity parade.
11	5	"Holy"	29 October 1992
Richie and Eddie experience a Christmas Day miracle.
12	6	"'s Out"	20 September 1993(Released on VHS); 10 April 1995(Aired on BBC2)
Richie and Eddie go camping out on Wimbledon Common. It had been scheduled for 5 November 1992, but was postponed due to a real-life murder that took place on Wimbledon Common.

=== Series 3 (1995) ===
No. overall	No. in season	Title	Original release date
13	1	"Hole"	6 January 1995
Richie and Eddie are trapped at the top of the tallest Ferris wheel in Western Europe which is due to be blown up the very next day.
14	2	"Terror"	13 January 1995
The pair plan a Halloween party and go trick-or-treating.
15	3	"Break"	20 January 1995
The duo prepare for their holiday in Doncaster.
16	4	"Dough"	27 January 1995
Eddie begins forging money, forcing the duo and their friends to enter a pub quiz to pay off a thug.
17	5	"Finger"	3 February 1995
Having acquired the honeymoon tickets of newly-weds Mr and Mrs Cannonball Taffy O'Jones, the pair descend upon a luxury hotel masquerading as the honeymooners.
18	6	"Carnival"	10 February 1995
Richie and Eddie have the best seats for the annual Hammersmith riots, then try to make videos with a camera stolen from the BBC van.

== Awards and nominations ==
Year	Award	Category	Title	Result	Ref
1992	British Comedy Awards	Best New TV Comedy	Bottom	Won	

== Home media ==
=== VHS releases ===
Title	Release date	Episodes	BBFC rating
Bottom – Smells (BBCV 4821)	21 September 1992	"Smells", "Gas", "Contest"	15
Bottom – Apocalypse (BBCV 4845)	21 September 1992	"Apocalypse", "'s Up", "Accident"	15
Bottom – Digger (BBCV 4994)	5 July 1993	"Digger", "Culture", "Burglary"	15
Bottom – Parade (BBCV 5115)	20 September 1993	"Parade", "Holy", "'s Out"	15
Bottom – Hole (BBCV 5660)	2 October 1995	"Hole", "Terror", "Break"	15
Bottom – Dough (BBCV 5661)	2 October 1995	"Dough", "Finger", "Carnival"	15
The Complete Bottom Series One	4 April 1994 (BBCV 5265)	"Smells", "Gas", "Contest", "Apocalypse", "'s Up", and "Accident"	15
The Complete Bottom Series Two	3 July 1995 (BBCV 5647)	"Digger", "Culture", "Burglary", "Parade", "Holy", "'s Out"	15
The Complete Bottom Series Three	2 September 1996 (BBCV 5906)	"Hole", "Terror", "Break", "Dough", "Finger", "Carnival"	15

=== DVD release ===
DVD Title	Disc #	Year	No. of Ep.	DVD release		
DVD Title	Disc #	Year	No. of Ep.	Region 1	Region 2	Region 4
Complete Series 1	1	1991	6	—	18 August 2003	6 October 2005
Complete Series 2	1	1992	6	—	30 August 2004	2 March 2006
Complete Series 3	1	1995	6	—	8 August 2005	6 July 2006
Complete Series 1–3	3	1991–1995	18	30 September 2003	3 October 2005	5 October 2006
The Very Best of...	1	1991–1995	5	—	5 August 2002	8 August 2002
The Big Bottom Box	7	1993–2003	6	—	4 December 2006	—

In 2004, a DVD featuring a compilation of violent scenes from Mayall and Edmondson throughout their career, including scenes from Bottom, was released as Mindless Violence: The Very Best of the Violent Bits.

== See also ==
- List of films based on British sitcoms
