= The Inspirational Choir of the Pentecostal First Born Church of the Living God =

Gospel choir based in London, England

Background information
- Also known as: The Inspirational Choir
- Origin: London, England
- Genres: Gospel music
- Labels: Stiff Records; Portrait Records; Opal Records

The Inspirational Choir of the Pentecostal First Born Church of the Living God, later the name was shortened to The Inspirational Choir, were a gospel choir based in London, England. The choir was founded by John Francis, who also co-founded the London Community Gospel Choir. Their recording career began as backing vocalists for Madness on their single "Wings Of A Dove", which reached No. 2 in the UK Singles Chart. They later produced their own single, which reached No. 36 in the UK Singles Chart and a studio album, which reached No. 59 in the UK Album Chart.

== History ==
The choir was founded in the early 1980s by John Francis, who also the co-founded of the London Community Gospel Choir. Francis was brought up in the church and his father was the pastor of a church in Islington, London.

The Inspirational Choir of the Pentecostal First Born Church of the Living God first appeared on a Channel 4 television gospel talent show called Black On Black. They came second but that led onto Madness wanting the choir to sing backing vocals on a demo of "Wings Of A Dove". Francis agreed with the lyrics and also to sing on the demo, and then went onto record the song which climbed to number two in the UK Singles Chart, and number 1 in the Irish Singles Chart.

Stiff Records subsequently signed the choir up and they recorded Clean Heart, a five-track EP of traditional gospel, which also included the single "Pick Me Up". It was produced by Madness' producers, Clive Langer and Alan Winstanley. In 1985 the choir was signed by Portrait Records, a sister label of CBS Records, and they persuaded the choir to shorten the choir's name to The Inspirational Choir. They released two singles, "Abide with Me", which reached number 36 in the UK Singles Chart and "I've Got A Feeling", which came from their debut album, Sweet Inspiration. The album reached number 59 in the UK Album Chart.

The choir's live appearances included performing at the London Palladium, the Festival Hall, the Bristol Concert Hall, and at the Glastonbury Festival. Francis also presented Britain's first gospel TV show People Get Ready! for UK based artists. In 1989 the choir recorded a live album, A Charge To Keep, although it wasn't until nearly two years later that it was released. By the early 1990s Francis had moved on and founded the Ruach Ministries.

== Discography ==
=== Albums ===
==== Studio albums ====
- Sweet Inspiration. (Portrait, 1985) Reached No.59 in the UK Albums Chart
- Higher & Higher (CBS, 1986)

==== Live albums ====
- A Charge To Keep (Opal Records, June 1991)

=== EPs ===
- Clean Heart (Stiff, 1983)

=== Singles ===
- "Pick Me Up" b/w "Do Not Pass Me By" (Stiff, Nov 1983)
- "Abide with Me" b/w "Sweet Holy Spirit" (Portrait, Dec 1984) Reached No. 36 in the UK Singles Chart
- "I've Got a Feeling" b/w "Right There" (Portrait, Sept 1985)
- "One Love (People Get Ready)" b/w "Right There" (Portrait, Feb 1986)
- "(Your Love Has Lifted Me) Higher and Higher" b/w "Amazing Grace" (Portrait, Nov 1986)
