= Bottom Live 3: Hooligan's Island =

1997 Live Show

Bottom Live 3: Hooligan's Island is a live stage show that was recorded at the Bristol Hippodrome, Bristol, in 1997, written by and starring Rik Mayall and Adrian Edmondson. This is the third installment of five live shows based on the television show Bottom.

== Plot ==
=== Act One ===
Richard "Richie" Richard (Mayall) and Edward Elizabeth "Eddie" Hitler (Edmondson) have been stranded on the titular uncharted island for three years. The show begins with Richie stuck in the island's latrine and struggling to free himself. Eddie enters and tells Richie that he rescued an unconscious "bird" from the beach and placed her in his hammock. Richie eagerly attempts to administer the "Shag of Life," only to discover that the "bird" is actually an albatross. After a fight with Eddie (which Richie loses, as usual), Richie prepares breakfast consisting of brambles and a dying fish he found in the latrine. Richie suffers food poisoning, leading to involuntary vomiting, burping, and flatulence.

The pair suddenly hear the sound of drums and spot a group of Welsh cannibals cooking Keith Floyd in a pot nearby. The cannibals notice Richie and Eddie and begin hunting them. Richie fends them off by vomiting in their direction (a side effect of the food poisoning), but the cannibals manage to land a poison dart on Richie's penis and Eddie's hat as they flee. To save Richie, Eddie retrieves a Japanese army World War II medical kit from his secret bunker and administers an antidote via a giant medical syringe injected into Richie's buttocks.

After a male albatross (presumably the mate of the unconscious female albatross) defecates on Eddie's head, the duo recount how they ended up on Hooligan's Island. Their misadventure began when Eddie convinced Richie to try ecstasy, leading to a chaotic "Nightmare 12-Hour Dance," a police chase, and the hijacking of an ambulance. They later encountered a theatrical impresario, Sir Leslie McBlowjob, who offered them a job in exchange for questionable favors. Their performance aboard a cruise liner went disastrously wrong, culminating in a shipwreck that left them stranded on the island.

=== Act Two ===
Still awaiting rescue as well getting bored of hanging around the beach, Richie and Eddie discover a 15 megaton nuclear bomb left behind by a French frogman as part of a nuclear testing program. After accidentally activating the bomb, they attempt various methods to defuse it, including using tools from Eddie's bunker and banging Richie's head against its surface. Near the end of the play, a French boat sails nearby, and Richie and Eddie desperately try to signal for help. Eddie's signal flares inadvertently hit the ship, causing it to explode. The play concludes with the bomb detonating as Richie and Eddie run out of time.

== VHS & DVD release ==
Shortly after it was filmed, it was released on VHS, and in 1999, it was released on DVD.

In late 2006, a DVD box set titled the Big Bottom Box, contains the show, along with the other four live shows, the movie and a "Best of Bottom Live" mockumentary titled Big Bottom Live.

== Television adaptation ==
On 23 August 2012, the BBC announced that Hooligan's Island was to be adapted into a television series. The show would be a spin-off sequel to Mayall and Edmondson's BBC Two sitcom, Bottom, and was due to air on BBC Two in 2013.

On 15 October 2012, Edmondson announced during an interview with BBC Radio Essex that he had pulled out of the new series of Hooligan's Island, saying that he wanted to pursue other interests.

During an appearance on Desert Island Discs in 2023, Edmondson revealed that he wrote the initial scripts with Mayall in the hope that they would be declined by the BBC. He explained that while Mayall was eager to revive their old characters, he struggled to accept that Edmondson was not interested. While he hoped a rejection by the BBC would put Mayall's aspirations to rest, the idea was ultimately greenlit. Edmondson went on to say that one of the reasons he pulled out of the project was because Mayall was "not there" during writing sessions, and he had struggled to work with him.
