= Andrew Bailey (performance artist) =

British performance artist and comedian

- Born: 1947 (age 78–79); Manchester, England
- Occupations: Performer, comedian, artist
- Known for: Performance art
- Website: www.comedycv.co.uk/andrewbailey/

Andrew Bailey (born 1947) is a British performance artist, character comedian, and musical absurdist from Manchester.

One of the original alternative comedy pioneers at London's seminal Comedy Store in the early 1980s, alongside Rik Mayall, French & Saunders and Ben Elton. He has performed at the Royal National Theatre in London, supported the Eurythmics and John Hegley and others, he has influenced the work of Jerry Sadowitz and Simon Munnery.

Andrew Bailey has been known to create highly visual performances that take risks on stage in order to provoke audiences. One such example of this is his character Podomovski, whom spoke in gibberish that was translated offstage, by Paul Merton, and as his performance went on it continued to get weirder. However, the audience were with him every step of the way.

Described as being on the "lunatic fringe" and "the King of Dysfunctional Doo Wop", Bailey has performed regularly at the Edinburgh Fringe, and on British television.
