= The Oblivion Boys =

The Oblivion Boys was a comedy double act primarily from the 1980s consisting of Mark Arden and Stephen Frost. As well as appearances on Saturday Live, The Young Ones and The Black Adder, they also became familiar to TV viewers in the UK by appearing in a series of Carling Black Label lager adverts.
