= Lee Hurst =

English comedian

- Born: Lee Hurst; 16 October 1962 (age 63); Tower Hamlets, London, England
- Notable work: They Think It's All Over
- Website: http://www.leehurst.com

Lee Hurst (born 16 October 1962) is an English comedian best known for his appearances as a panelist on the comedy sports quiz They Think It's All Over from 1995 to 1997.

== Career ==
Hurst took up comedy after being employed in a number of jobs after leaving school. He made his first appearance on stage at the Donmar Warehouse and later said that, at the time, "I only had four jokes and they were really crap but I told the first one and got a huge laugh. I couldn't believe it. I thought, 'This is all right'".

=== Television work ===
==== They Think It's All Over ====
Hurst got a break when he became the warm-up act for Have I Got News for You and producer Harry Thompson gave him the opportunity to appear on the show as a guest.

Hurst first became known to television viewers as a regular team member on the BBC One comedy sports quiz They Think It's All Over.

After leaving to allow more time for running his comedy club, he returned for two appearances as a guest panellist towards the end of its run for series 17 in 2004, and for the 2011 Comic Relief 24 Hour Panel People.

==== Other television credits ====
Hurst's other TV credits include presenting Shark Tank, Salvage Squad and The Warehouse, and guest appearances on That's Showbusiness, The Stand Up Show and Have I Got News for You. He has also appeared as a regular panelist on Don't Give Up Your Day Job. He also fronted ITV's short-lived revival of the entertainment show Saturday Live.

=== Writing ===
Hurst was the creator of Bring Me the Head of Light Entertainment, which ran for five series on Five between 1997 and 2000.

== Personal life ==
In 2014, he married a former barmaid he met at his London comedy club. They have two sons.

== Politics ==
Hurst was a critic of the Blair government. He refuses to be interviewed by newspapers owned by Rupert Murdoch and in one interview, stated that he stopped attending a back support group which helped him with his ankylosing spondylitis after he found out that it was run as a charity, explaining that "I believe it should be provided by the State through taxation. I'd be very hypocritical if I used their facilities when I won't do medical charity benefits".

In 2003, he considered standing as a candidate in the 2004 London mayoral election. One of the factors behind his decision was a proposed redevelopment, which would have seen his comedy club demolished.

=== Social media activity ===
In March 2021, Hurst was briefly suspended from Twitter after he tweeted a sexual joke about climate activist Greta Thunberg which led to widespread criticism. He was again suspended from Twitter in June 2021 when he was accused of inciting violence against Chief Medical Officer Chris Whitty.

Hurst has made many comments on social media, particularly Twitter, expressing his support for Reform UK.
