= Olé (group) =

Musical comedy trio

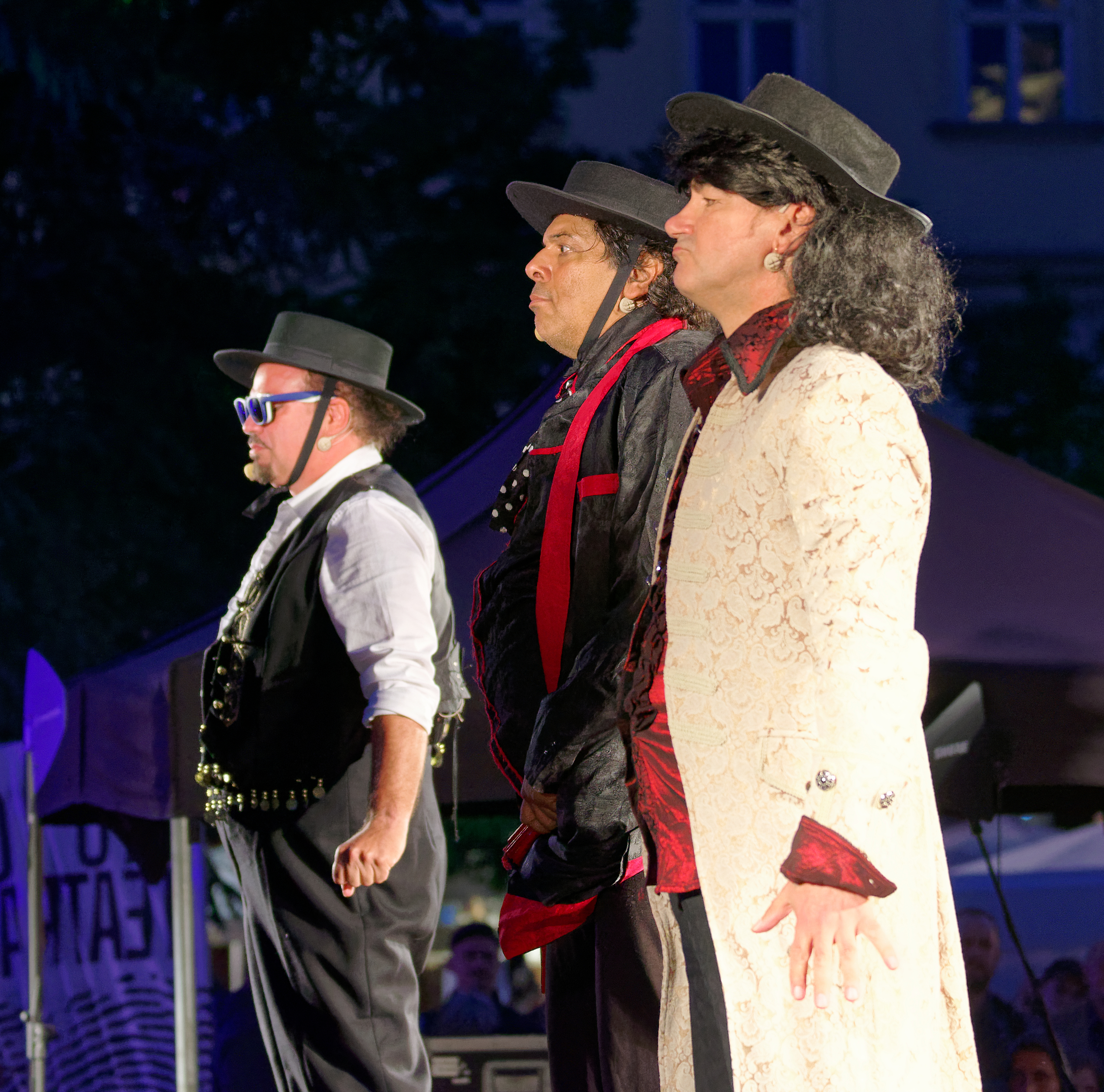
Paul Morocco and Olé at international street theatre festival in Kraków

Ole! is an international musical comedy show created by Paul Morocco in 1991.

== Paul Morocco ==
Paul Morocco was born in 1961 in Virginia Beach, Virginia, United States. He comes from a Moroccan mother and an American father. Paul was taught to play guitar by his brother at the age of 10, and learned to juggle with three lemons while working in a restaurant at the age of 15. In 1978, he joined the International Jongleurs Association where he won several competitions. After he had performed in many school plays, it was his high school talent show that was to sow the seeds of the life of an artist.

In 1980, he attended Old Dominion University, where he studied languages and international marketing. In 1984, he learned the ancient craft of passing the hat; he street-performed from New Orleans to New York, and finally ended up in Europe. In 1985, he won the Cardiff Street Festival Competition. In 1987, he based himself in London, where he became well known on the comedy club circuit, and soon began appearing on numerous TV shows and commercials: The Jonathan Ross Show, Saturday Night Live, Playdays, Vimto and Worthington.

== EC Big Band, "Ole!" and "Lost Locos" ==
In 1990, Paul created a new show called Paul Morocco and the EC Big Band. Collaborating with Bill Bailey and Alessandro Bernardi, they performed at the London Mime Festival. With his new manager, Glynnis Henderson, and the combined talents of Alessandro Bernardi and Antonio Forcione, he formed the “Ole” show, where they won the British Gas Awards and the Scotsman Best Newcomer's Award at the 1991 Edinburgh Festival. In 1993, Ole performed for “Just For Laughs” in Montreal, as well as the Adelaide, and Melbourne Comedy festivals. In 1995 in his first TV Sitcom, he played a silent character in the Asylum for Paramount Television.

In 1996, Guillermo de Endaya joined the show. The following year Marcial Heredia joined Ole. They performed with Ramon Ruiz and Anita La Maltesa in a five-person show, where they performed throughout Italy in theatres and television including: Maurizio Constanzo's “Buona Domenica”, Aldo, Giovanni e Giacomo show, Teatro Nazionale in Milan.

In 2002, Michael Hilleckenbach became Paul's international manager. In 2005, Antonio Gomez joined Ole, and in the same year Paul Morocco created the second show based on Ole, called Lost Locos. The artists include: Carlos Chávez, Juan Antonio Portela, and Rubén Alvear.

In the following years both “Ole!” and “Lost Locos” performed around Europe, Asia and North America. In 2011 “Ole!” received a special award from the Koblenz Festival in Germany.

In 2012, the Portuguese clown-actor Joao Lemos joined the team of “Ole!” artists.

In 2014 the group took the first prize at Daidogei World Cup in Japan.

In 2015 the marketing of "Lost Locos" was discontinued, its former members now perform as a part of "Ole!".

In 2017 “Ole!” appeared on “Karnevalskracher 2017” on Das Erste, and performed at the XI Carnaval Internacional De Las Artes in Colombia. The same year the group performed for Snowball Express Event Supporting Children of Fallen Military Heroes.
