= Mr. Jolly Lives Next Door =

British comedy film (1987)

- Mr. Jolly Lives Next Door
- Written by: Adrian Edmondson; Rik Mayall; Rowland Rivron
- Directed by: Stephen Frears
- Starring: Rik Mayall; Adrian Edmondson; Peter Richardson; Nicholas Parsons; Peter Cook
- Country of origin: United Kingdom

Production
- Producer: Elaine Taylor

Original release
- Release: 5 March 1988

Mr. Jolly Lives Next Door is a 1987 comedy film made for British television as part of The Comic Strip Presents... series. It was briefly screened theatrically in late 1987 and was broadcast on Channel 4 on 5 March 1988. It was released on VHS in the late 1980s, and became available on DVD when the entire Comic Strip Presents... series was released as a box set in the UK in June 2005. It has also been repeated occasionally on the Paramount Comedy Channel.

== Plot ==
Rik Mayall and Adrian Edmondson are the (unnamed) proprietors of an escort agency, Dreamytime Escorts. Mayall's character is devious, low-minded, calculating and stupid; Edmondson's is merely very stupid.

Unusually, rather than providing businessmen with female companionship, the activities of their escort agency essentially involve the pair swooping on unsuspecting foreigners who call them, and forcing them to take part in a drinking binge at their expense. The two are alcohol-obsessed; when their home-brewed beer (which takes a mere two days to brew and has a head made from washing-up liquid) is not available, they steal from the delivery lorries pulling up at the off-licence downstairs: Edmondson's character dives out of the window into a large builders' bucket and is hauled back up by Mayall.

Their next-door neighbour is Mr. Jolly, a psychopathic contract killer played by Peter Cook. Jolly's modus operandi is to hack his victims to death with a meat cleaver while playing classic Tom Jones tunes from the 1960s to drown their cries.

Heimi Henderson, who owns the off-licence downstairs, has refused demands for protection money by Mr. Lovebucket, an effete gangster played by Peter Richardson whose abiding love is his Citroën DS car.

Mayall and Edmondson intercept a request intended for Mr. Jolly to "take out" the radio presenter and game show host Nicholas Parsons, who appears as himself. Parsons is due to open Henderson's off-licence, and Lovebucket wants to put a stop to it. Misinterpreting the request, they spend an evening with Parsons, who stays in their company because he believes them to be competition winners, the real ones having been pushed off the road by the Dreamytime Escorts' van in an earlier scene. The two are confronted the following morning by Lovebucket, who wants to know what they've done with the money provided with the contract (which they have used to buy 1574 large gin and tonics). Lovebucket insists that they complete the contract.

The two return to Parsons's house armed with a gun, chainsaw and grenades but fail to kill him as he leaves by helicopter to the off-licence to open it. They chase after the helicopter with Lovebucket and his gang pursuing them but crash their van into a skip. Parsons reaches the off-licence but cannot find Henderson so he goes upstairs and meets Mr. Jolly and is presumably killed by him.

Mayall and Edmondson got into their office and start packing their suitcases to go and live in Rio but see into Jolly's office and watch him talking to Lovebucket. Some of the gang members go into their office only to find it empty as the two have escaped through the window into the off-licence where they are told by Henderson that Parsons is opening it, much to their excitement. Shortly after Henderson overhears the two talking about killing Parsons, causing Mayall to shoot him dead, but tricks Edmondson into thinking he did it. Edmondson decides to have a drink but instead takes a bottle of explosive tonic water from a shelf causing an explosion in the off-licence.

It is revealed during the credits that the two survived and are walking along a canal where Mayall knocks Edmondson into it before walking off with Edmondson swimming after him.

== Cast ==
- Adrian Edmondson and Rik Mayall as Dreamy Time Escorts
- Peter Cook as Mr Jolly
- Peter Richardson as Mr Lovebucket
- Thomas Wheatley as Heimi Henderson
- Nicholas Parsons as himself
- Jennifer Saunders as Monica
- Michael Cule as Mr Cooper
- Dawn French as Mrs Cooper
- Basil Ho Yen as Mr Yakimoto
- Gerard Kelly as Hilary
- Granville Saxton as Ron
- Philip Locke as Sir Larry
