= Bottom Live =

1993 Live Show

Bottom Live – The Stage Show
- Original language: English
- Written by: Rik Mayall; Adrian Edmondson
- Characters: Richie Richard; Eddie Hitler
- Genre: Comedy
- Setting: Hammersmith

Premiere
- Date: 27 December 1993
- Place: Mayflower Theatre, Southampton

Bottom Live – The Stage Show is a live stage show based on the UK TV series Bottom. It ran in 1993 and was recorded for VHS (and later DVD) release at the Mayflower Theatre in Southampton. It was written by its stars, Rik Mayall as Richie Richard and Adrian Edmondson as Eddie Hitler.

== Plot ==
Following a weekend lock-in in the lavatories of their local pub, Richie and Eddie return to their flat. After they unsuccessfully attempt to prepare breakfast the mail arrives, containing a letter and parcel for Richie. The letter is from the solicitors, which Eddie is left to dispose of, and the parcel contains a blow-up doll Richie ordered without his flatmate's knowledge. He bribes Eddie to leave the flat so he can be alone with his new friend Monica, unaware that Eddie has opened the solicitors' letter and discovered that following his uncle's death, Richie is now owed £15,000, which he wishes to claim for himself.

The second act opens with Richie having trouble with Monica; ultimately he accidentally attaches himself to the doll with superglue from the hand cream jar. Eddie returns intending to kill him to claim the £15,000. He helps remove the doll, then tries to poison Richie, albeit unsuccessfully. When Richie himself reads the solicitors' letter, he discovers that the £15,000 is actually a debt Richie owes, as his uncle never paid it during his lifetime. He resigns himself to suicide, but not before Eddie has tricked him into signing a marriage certificate (assuming it was an adoption certificate and that such a bond will entitle him to the money). The play ends with Eddie realising his mistake for both the certificate (Which he was told by the legal office that they run out of papers for adoptions, but never understood it until Richie points out the error) and the solicitors' letter (he failed to read the rest of it), and the pair apparently electrocute themselves to avoid paying the debt that they both now owe.
