= The Dangerous Brothers =

1980s British comedy act

Dangerous Brothers Present: World of Danger, 1986

The Dangerous Brothers was a stage and TV act by anarchic comedy duo Rik Mayall and Adrian Edmondson, performing respectively as "Richard Dangerous" and "Sir Adrian Dangerous". Originally appearing on stage in London at the comedy club The Comic Strip, the characters were well developed before appearing on TV. First appearing on television on a one-off 1980 BBC TV show Boom Boom Out Go The Lights, they were also featured in a TV short documentary film The Comic Strip, directed by Julien Temple, before they appeared in a number of brief sketches in the TV programme Saturday Live from 1985 and into its first series in 1986.

The act was, in essence, a prototype of the career which the pair were to forge over the next 20 years in such shows as Mr Jolly Lives Next Door, Filthy, Rich and Catflap and Bottom - two low-life loser perverts hitting each other in spectacular slapstick ways. It was arguably more hazardous than much of the material which was to follow in later incarnations - stage props in the brief run included a live crocodile, blank-firing submachine guns, and Edmondson apparently consuming Vim, a well-known UK brand of powder toilet cleaner.

Sketch performed on BoomBoom Out Go The Lights

- Knock Knock Joke / Gooseberry in a Lift

Sketch performed in The Comic Strip

- Knock Knock Joke / Gooseberry in a Lift

(The Comic Strip version is a different performance with a slightly different conclusion, and features swearing)

Sketches performed on Saturday Live

- World Of Danger (AKA The Towering Inferno)
- Big Stunt
- Torture - featuring Norman Lovett
- Crocodile Snogging (which featured a live crocodile) and featuring John Bird
- Flying Zebra
- Exploding Politicians
- How To Get Off With A Lady - featuring Edmondson's wife Jennifer Saunders
- Babysitting - featuring Morwenna Banks as the wife and John Bird as the husband.
- Dangervision - featuring Hugh Laurie and Stephen Fry.
- Kinky Sex

"Kinky Sex" was supposedly vetoed by Channel 4 censors and was not broadcast. In a replacement sketch, the Dangerous Brothers hijack a "flower arranging dance" routine by Hugh Laurie and Stephen Fry, claiming to have been banned from Saturday Live for being "too sexy and too violent". They then move outside the studio and blow up a wall on which the show's logo is painted in graffiti art. "Kinky Sex", which by modern standards seems fairly tame, was finally released on a compilation video The Dangerous Brothers present: World of Danger. Several Dangerous Brothers sketches are also included on the DVD compilation Saturday Live: The Best of Series One (2007).

== Dangervision: The DVD ==
A DVD of all of the sketches featured in the show was released in 2009. However, the "Kinky Sex" episode is taken from a home video source as the original could not be found. In comparison to the videotape release, some of the sketches on the DVD appear to be longer and some slightly shorter, and music edits also appear to have been made. The laugh track is also different – the video used laughter from the unseen studio audience and also canned laughter, while the DVD uses only the former.
