= Saturday Live (British TV programme) =

Comedy and music show

- Genre: Variety; Stand-up comedy; Music
- Country of origin: United Kingdom
- Original language: English
- No. of series: 4
- No. of episodes: 39 (list of episodes)

Production
- Production companies: LWT (1985–1996); Pozzitive Television (2007); Phil McIntyre Television (2022); Boffola Pictures (2022)

Original release
- Network: Channel 4
- Release: 12 January 1985 – 29 April 1988
- Network: BBC1
- Release: 12 March 1993
- Network: ITV
- Release: 1 June – 20 July 1996
- Release: 1 December 2007
- Network: Channel 4
- Release: 21 October 2022

Related
- Saturday Night Live; Saturday Night Live UK (2026)

Saturday Live (retitled Friday Night Live for the 1988 series and 2022 one-off special) is a British television comedy and music show, made by LWT and initially broadcast on Channel 4 from 1985 to 1988, with a brief revival on ITV in 1996. A few one-off editions have also been screened sporadically, including a contribution to the BBC's 1993 Comic Relief telethon. It was based on the American sketch comedy show Saturday Night Live but otherwise had no direct connection to the show.

The series made stars of Ben Elton and Harry Enfield, and featured appearances (in some cases first television appearances) by Stephen Fry and Hugh Laurie, Patrick Marber, Morwenna Banks, Chris Barrie, Julian Clary, Emo Philips, Tracey Ullman, Craig Ferguson, Sam Kinison, Craig Charles, Josie Lawrence and many others. The pilot show and first series featured comic duo Adrian Edmondson and Rik Mayall in their act The Dangerous Brothers each week. The introductory theme was an original composition by Paul Hardcastle.

== History ==
All episodes were transmitted live but contained a small proportion of material recorded beforehand. Recordings of shows were edited into compilation repeats, titled Saturday Almost Live.

The third series, Friday Night Live, renamed to reflect its scheduling move to the titular day, is the last of the programme's original iteration. A shorter and slightly tighter-formatted show, it retained Elton as regular host. The show's title sequence consisted of re-forming clay animations, highly comparable to early MTV idents.

The show was resurrected as a segment for 1993's Red Nose Day BBC telethon, hosted by Ben Elton, with appearances by Reeves and Mortimer, Eddie Izzard, Hugh Laurie, and Newman & Baddiel.

The show made a return in 1996 on ITV, regaining a Saturday slot and retitled accordingly. Hosted by Lee Hurst, it featured comedians including Harry Hill and Simon Munnery. The series lasted eight episodes before being axed.

On 1 December 2007, the programme was revived by ITV for a one-off titled Saturday Live Again, presented by Marcus Brigstocke. Comedians included Jimmy Carr, Lee Mack, Mitchell and Webb, and Jocelyn Jee Esien. The original show's regular host Ben Elton also performed. There were musical performances by Bon Jovi and Hard-Fi.

In August 2022, it was announced the programme was being revived for a one-off special, as part of Channel 4's 40th-anniversary celebrations, and would again be hosted by Ben Elton. The special aired on 21 October 2022. The special gained notoriety for a musical performance in which transgender comedian Jordan Gray stripped nude to a live audience.

== Transmissions ==
=== Series ===
Series	Season	Slot Time	Episodes	Originally released			Director	Producers
Series	Season	Slot Time	Episodes	First released	Last released	Network	Director	Producers
Live shows
Saturday Live	Pilot show	90 mins	1	12 January 1985		Channel 4	Paul Jackson	Paul Jackson
Saturday Live	Series 1	90 mins	10	25 January 1986	29 March 1986	Channel 4	Geoff Posner	Geoff Posner and Paul Jackson
Saturday Live	Series 2	75 mins	10	7 February 1987	11 April 1987	Channel 4	Ian Hamilton	Geoff Posner and Geoffrey Perkins
Friday Night Live	Series 1	75 mins	10	19 February 1988	29 April 1988	Channel 4	Ian Hamilton	Geoff Posner and Geoffrey Perkins
Saturday Live	Series 3	60 mins	8	1 June 1996	20 July 1996	ITV	Ian Hamilton	Ian Hamilton and Susie Dark
Highlights shows
Best of Saturday Live	Pilot show highlights	60 mins	1	4 January 1986		ITV	Paul Jackson	Paul Jackson
Saturday Almost Live	Series 1 highlights	60 mins	6	13 September 1986	18 October 1986	Channel 4	Geoff Posner	Geoff Posner and Paul Jackson
Saturday Almost Live	Series 2 highlights	60 mins	8	3 October 1987	21 November 1987	Channel 4	Ian Hamilton	Geoff Posner and Geoffrey Perkins
Friday Night Almost Live	Series 1 highlights	60 mins	8	12 October 1988	30 November 1988	Channel 4	Ian Hamilton	Geoff Posner and Geoffrey Perkins

=== Specials ===
Title	Description	Slot Time	Air Date	Network	Director	Producers
Saturday Live	Re-edited show for ITV's 1986 Golden Rose of Montreux entry	45 mins	22 April 1986	Channel 4	Geoff Posner	Geoff Posner and Geoffrey Perkins
Friday Night Live Lives Again!	Comic Relief Special	60 mins	12 March 1993	BBC1	?	?
Saturday Live Again!	One-off 20th anniversary revival show	90 mins	1 December 2007	ITV	Geoff Posner	Geoff Posner and David Tyler
Friday Night Live	One-off revival for Channel 4's 40th anniversary	95 mins	21 October 2022	Channel 4	Geoff Posner	Susie Hall

== Home releases ==
A compilation double DVD set, Saturday Live: The Best of Series One, was released on 16 April 2007, containing almost two-and-a-half hours of material. No music performances from the shows were included. Saturday Live: The Best of Series 2 was released on 4 February 2008, and The Very Best of Friday Night Live was released on 2 June 2008. On 5 October 2009, a fourth release, a 3-disc set collecting all the show's Fry & Laurie and Harry Enfield sketches and the best Ben Elton monologues, was released.

DVD title	Discs	Year	Release date
Saturday Live: The Best of Series 1	2	1986	16 April 2007
Saturday Live: The Best of Series 2	2	1987	4 February 2008
The Very Best of Friday Night Live	2	1988	2 June 2008
Saturday Live: Fry and Laurie, Harry Enfield and Ben Elton	3	1986–1988	5 October 2009

== See also ==
- The Comic Strip
