= Raw Sex =

Raw sex may refer to:

- a British comedy musical group consisting of Rowland Rivron and Simon Brint, featured regularly on BBC TV's French and Saunders show
- bareback sex, sexual activity without the use of condoms
