= French and Saunders =

Television series

- French (left) and Saunders (right)
- Created by: Dawn French; Jennifer Saunders
- Starring: Dawn French; Jennifer Saunders
- Country of origin: United Kingdom
- No. of series: 6
- No. of episodes: 48 (not including the compilation specials) (list of episodes)

Production
- Running time: Various

Original release
- Network: BBC2
- Release: 9 March 1987 – 1 April 1993
- Network: BBC One
- Release: 30 December 1994 – 27 December 2005

French and Saunders is a British sketch comedy television series written by and starring comedy duo and namesakes Dawn French and Jennifer Saunders that originally broadcast on BBC2 from 1987 to 1993, and later on BBC One until 2017. It is also the name by which the performers are known when they appear elsewhere as a double act. The show was given one of the highest budgets in BBC history to create detailed spoofs and satires of popular culture, movies, celebrities, and art. French and Saunders continued to film holiday specials for the BBC, and both have been individually successful starring in other shows.

In a 2005 poll to find The Comedian's Comedian, the duo were voted among the top 50 comedy acts ever by fellow comedians and comedy insiders. Their last special, French and Saunders Christmas Celebrity Special, aired on 27 December 2005 on BBC One. In 2006, both French and Saunders announced their sketch show was dead and that they had moved on to more age-appropriate material. Their last time performing as a duo, the Still Alive tour, ran initially until late 2008, then resumed in Australia in summer 2009. In 2009, the duo were jointly awarded the BAFTA Fellowship, due to their significant international influence on satire and sketch comedy. Since 2009, French and Saunders decided to occasionally do more satire usually for comic relief including Mamma Mia, Gogglebox and The Traitors.

== History ==
=== Background (1978–1987) ===
Dawn French and Jennifer Saunders met in 1978 while they were studying drama at the Royal Central School of Speech and Drama and began their career by collaborating on several comedy projects. They came to prominence in the early 1980s for performing at the London alternative comedy club The Comedy Store, which also gave its name to its television series The Comic Strip Presents... and the informal grouping of so-called "alternative comedians". French and Saunders were featured on the live comedy album of The Comic Strip recorded by comedy entrepreneur Martin Lewis for his Springtime! label and released in 1981. The duo made their first mainstream television appearance in The Comic Strip Presents..., appearing in approximately 30 episodes each and writing material for the show.

French and Saunders began to establish themselves in what was referred to as the "underground comedy" scene, along with many other prolific actors and comedians they would work with during the next twenty-plus years. In 1983, they starred in an edition of Channel 4's series The Entertainers, and later went on to appear as comedy relief on the same channel's weekly music programme The Tube, which permitted French the honour of being the first person to use the word "blowjob" on British television. In 1985, French and Saunders collaborated on the programme Girls on Top, which they once again (with Ruby Wax) wrote and starred in. Co-stars Tracey Ullman and Ruby Wax rounded out a set of four oddball roommates, and the show ran for two series. In 1986, French and Saunders made their first of many appearances on Comic Relief, and they signed a long-term contract with the BBC.

=== French and Saunders (1987–2007) ===
French and Saunders parodying James Cameron's blockbuster film Titanic

In 1987, French and Saunders created their eponymous sketch show, which lasted six series and nine specials until 2005. Compilations of previous material appeared until 2017. The show began humbly but established its own niche.

The first series was intentionally set up to look like a low-budget variety show in which the duo constantly attempted grandiose stunts and often failed miserably. A "famous" guest star would often be brought on but mistreated. Also featured during this series were a troupe of geriatric dancers called The Hot Hoofers and a bongos/keyboard music duo called Raw Sex, actually Comic Strip collaborators Simon Brint and Rowland Rivron in character as stepfather and stepson Ken and Duane Bishop respectively. Alison Moyet and Joan Armatrading each appeared in one episode. The dancing and music were included to fulfil the series' mandate as a light entertainment series to include "a certain amount of variety" rather than pure comedy (as the BBC's budget for Light Entertainment was considerably higher than that of their Comedy department). The show-within-a-show premise was dropped with the second series in 1988.

As the show progressed, ratings skyrocketed, eventually prompting the BBC to move it from BBC2 to BBC1 in 1994. French and Saunders received higher and higher budgets to create elaborate parodies of mainstream culture. These ranged anywhere from re-creations of films (e.g., Thelma & Louise, Misery, Titanic, and What Ever Happened to Baby Jane?) to spoofs of popular music artists including Madonna, Bananarama, ABBA and The Corrs. Certain spoken phrases and sight gags referencing previously performed sketches (often from years before) were incorporated for loyal fans. In particular, there is a running gag suggesting French and Saunders are unable to affect accents accurately: this first appeared in their spoof of Gone with the Wind when they break their character in the middle of an elaborate and expensive parody to argue about the authenticity of their Southern accent. Saunders goads French to try the accent by saying: "How are you?", and French responds with an interpretation sounding more like a strong Northern Irish accent. Since then, the duo often break character in the middle of elaborate sketches to do an "accent check" and repeat these lines.

The show also contained numerous meta references: an awareness that the viewer was watching a parody. Unlike many parodies done straightforwardly for effect, French and Saunders use the viewer's awareness of what is going on to stretch out the joke further. For example, in their parody of Peter Jackson's fantasy film epic The Lord of the Rings, an encounter between Frodo and Galadriel is thrown off after Saunders delivers her line: "I have passed the test, and now I will diminish, and go to the West and remain Galadriel". French responds, "You will what, sorry?", to which Saunders replies: "I will diminish... I don't understand, it's in the book!" Other characters that make a recurring appearance are the bald, fat, perverted old men ("Begging for it, she is!"); two perpetually overacting extras; and Star Pets ("What a lovely dog, Lady Fortescue: I bet he do's tricks").

The sixth and final series aired in 2004, returning to the first series' metafictional premise. In this series, the two lampooned themselves as incapable of getting any work done: Saunders later characterised it as "a fairly accurate rendition of our writing process" but asserted that, while they appeared to others to be procrastinating, they were actually generating writing ideas. The series also starred Liza Tarbuck as a heavily fictionalised version of herself, forced to be the fictional show's producer despite her actual career goal of creating and producing game shows, and Lorna Brown as the production assistant, Abba. Maggie Steed appeared in two episodes as the duo's agent, Mo, based on their real agent, Maureen Vincent, while Eileen Essell and Brenda Cowling appeared briefly in several episodes as Abba's imagination of French and Saunders, respectively, as old women. The show ended with a final Christmas special in 2005. A compilation series, A Bucket o' French and Saunders, aired in 2007.

In 2008, the pair retired the show after performing a sketch with the singer Anastacia, in which French dressed in a similar outfit to the US star. French said she was left feeling "humiliated".

=== Post-show developments (2007–present) ===
In Christmas 2010, French and Saunders were featured in three two-hour radio shows on BBC Radio 2. This was followed by further specials in 2011 for Easter and the Bank Holidays.

In 2020, the duo debuted a podcast titled French & Saunders: Titting About on Audible. The podcast features the pair in relaxed, often nostalgic conversations about a new topic in each episode. Series 2 was released in 2021, and Series 3 in 2022. Series 4 was released in 2023.

In 2021, it was announced that Gold had commissioned a new one-off special titled French and Saunders: Funny Women. The special, filmed on the set of their original sketch series, features a discussion by French and Saunders and focuses on the history of women who have contributed to comedy. It was broadcast on Gold on 17 July that year.

== Cast ==
In addition to French and Saunders themselves, the sketch series featured several regular and recurring cast members, who were chosen for their "funny bones" and willingness to "be part of the gang".

Although the amount of music in the show decreased over time, Raw Sex remained regular cast members through series 4. Betty Marsden also appeared in series one as Madame, the show's choreographer. Singer Kirsty MacColl appeared in one episode of series two and five episodes of series 3, sometimes performing jointly with Raw Sex.

For series 5, Mel and Sue served as assistant writers and appeared in four of the seven episodes. In series 6, the show returned to the show-within-a-show format of series 1, with Liza Tarbuck appearing in each episode as the fictional show's producer and Lorna Brown as the PA.

The show also featured dozens of guest stars. Notably, Saunders' Absolutely Fabulous co-stars Joanna Lumley, Julia Sawalha, and June Whitfield all guest-starred as themselves, with Whitfield appearing on the show three years before the beginning of Ab Fab. The spouses of the duo, Lenny Henry and Adrian Edmondson, both appeared on the show respectively, while the producer, Jon Plowman, made occasional uncredited cameos. Recurring Ab Fab actors Patrick Barlow, Harriet Thorpe, Helen Lederer, and Kathy Burke also appeared, as did French's The Vicar of Dibley co-star Gary Waldhorn, and Jam & Jerusalem regulars Maggie Steed, Rosie Cavaliero, and Pauline McLynn.

=== Regular ===
Actor	Role(s)	Series 1	Series 2	Series 3	Series 4	Series 5	Series 6
Dawn French	Herself / Various	Regular	Regular	Regular	Regular	Regular	Regular
Jennifer Saunders	Herself / Various	Regular	Regular	Regular	Regular	Regular	Regular
Simon Brint	Ken Bishop / Various	Regular	Regular	Regular	Regular		
Rowland Rivron	Duane Bishop / Various	Regular	Regular	Regular	Regular		
Betty Marsden	Madame	Regular					
Kirsty MacColl	Herself		Guest	Regular			
Lorna Brown	Abba						Regular
Liza Tarbuck	Liza						Regular

=== Recurring ===
- Kevin Allen (8 episodes, 1990–1996)
- Patrick Barlow (8 episodes, 1990–2003)
- Kathy Burke (7 episodes, 1988–1999)
- Sean Chapman (3 episodes, 1994–2002)
- Sidney Cole (4 episodes, 1993–1995)
- Brenda Cowling (5 episodes, 2004)
- Adrian Edmondson (4 episodes, 1988–2017)
- Eileen Essell (4 episodes, 2004)
- Mel Giedroyc (4 episodes, 1996)
- Lenny Henry (4 episodes, 1988–1996)
- Lulu (3 episodes, 1988–2017)
- Patsy Kensit (3 episodes, 1996)
- Kate Moss (4 episodes, 1996)
- Sue Perkins (4 episodes, 1996)
- Maggie Steed (3 episodes, 1998–2004)
- Harriet Thorpe (8 episodes, 1987–2003)
- Ian Tough (3 episodes, 1993–1996)
- Janette Tough (5 episodes, 1993–2005)
- Tim Wylton (4 episodes, 1993–2004)
- Jon Plowman (3 episodes, 2003–2017) (uncredited)
- Keturah Sorrell (5 episodes, 1987) (uncredited)

== Episodes ==
French and Saunders first broadcast on 9 March 1987 on BBC2, with the first series comprising six episodes. With its popularity and high ratings, a second series commenced on 4 March 1988, followed by a Christmas special in late 1988. The third, fourth and fifth series, which broadcast from 1990 to 1996, consisting each of seven episodes, relied heavily on movie parodies, and some music parodies, alongside their own material, such as the sketch "Modern Mother and Daughter", which spawned Saunders' popular sitcom Absolutely Fabulous in 1992. Notable films parodied on the show included What Ever Happened to Baby Jane?, The Exorcist, Misery, The Silence of the Lambs, Thelma & Louise, Pulp Fiction, and Braveheart. A second Christmas special was screened in 1994, between the fourth and fifth series. For the next several years, the series included only Christmas and Easter specials; in 1998, a new special, "The Making of Titanic", was broadcast at Christmas and featured a spoof on the behind-the-scenes and making of James Cameron's 1997 film Titanic, with Dawn French as Jack and Jennifer Saunders as Rose. Five further specials, including spoofs on the films Star Wars: Episode I – The Phantom Menace, The Lord of the Rings: The Fellowship of the Ring and Love Actually, were broadcast from 1999 to 2003, before the sixth and final series in 2004, and an additional Christmas special in 2005. Forty-eight episodes (not including the compilation episodes) were broadcast between 1987 and 2005.

The series additionally included compilation specials, starting in 1995 with the two-part "French and Saunders Go To the Movies", which highlighted their movie parodies from the series. A second two-part compilation special, "I Can't Believe it's Music" and "I Can't Believe it's Not Music" from 2005, showcased their classic music parodies from singers such as Alanis Morissette, ABBA, The Corrs, Guns N' Roses, and Björk. In 2007, the compilation series "A Bucket o' French and Saunders", which featured a mixture of new material and old clips, was broadcast to highlight the 20th anniversary of the series. However, this proved unpopular with viewers, and the initial seven-part series was edited to six episodes. On 25 December 2017, a new compilation special, "300 Years of French and Saunders", marked the 30th anniversary of the series, and again consisted mainly of old clips, while new material featured spoofs of Gogglebox and Keeping Up with the Kardashians.

== Live shows ==
French and Saunders toured rarely, with UK tours in 1990 and 2000. They began what was announced as their final tour at Blackpool Opera House on 29 February 2008 in the UK. The first leg of the show concluded in May 2008 before moving to Australia. The tour ended on 9 November in London. The tour included a selection of their favourite sketches and new material written specifically for the show. The tour was directed by Hamish McColl, set design by Lez Brotherstone, and lighting, video and visual effects by Willie Williams.

- Live 1990
- Live in 2000
- French and Saunders: Still Alive! The Farewell Tour

== Recurring sketches and characters ==
- Sharon and Karen (1987–1988): A pair of naughty schoolgirls who call out "Miss!" every time things go wrong.
- The Extras (1987–2003): Unnamed extras who infuriate every director with their overacting, and every actor with their overfamiliarity.
- Jim and Jim (1987–1993): Also known as "The Fat Men", the "Dirty Old Men", or simply "Men". Whether at the pub, in front of the telly, or trying out for panto, they think they're God's gift to women and sexually harass any woman they meet.
- Teen Talkers (1987–1988): Two chatty teenagers who discuss changes in the facilities in a series 1 episode and contraception in a series 2 episode.
- White Room (1988–2005): Dawn and Jennifer interact in a room with white walls and bubble-wrapped furniture. Dawn knocks at the door and usually announces herself as "Dawn French, your comedy partner" or "Dawn French from teleovision", while Jennifer sits on the couch and tries to make her uncomfortable. The two sometimes impersonated celebrities or other characters within the sketch, and occasionally, it was used as a springboard to another sketch, such as a parody of Noel's House Party or Dr. Tanya Byron's intervention.
- History of Dance (1988–1996): French and Saunders try out different dancing styles (e.g., Irish jig, flappers, 90s clubbers, disco, sock hops), but the dancing always goes wrong in the end.
- Jackie and Leanne (1988–1996): Dramatic young women obsessed with mail-order catalogues and plan for events such as holidays and weddings far in advance.
- Pear Tree Farm (1988–2005): A farm whose owner (French) repeatedly changes its line of business, always assisted by her mentally disabled, unpaid employee (Saunders), who often unintentionally reveals unpleasant truths the owner has been hiding. Initially, the farm was home to Star Pets, which supplied animals to TV and film productions; subsequent businesses included an animal crematory and a children's nursery. French's character first appeared in series 2, but the farm and Saunders' character didn't appear until series 3.
- Star Test (1990): A spoof of the show of the same name, serving as a platform to parody the interview subjects, which included Sonia, Bros, Wendy James of Transvision Vamp, and Tanita Tikaram.
- The Expert (1990–2000): A talk show host (Saunders) introduces Dawn as an "expert" on a subject such as the royal family or outer space, but Dawn constantly shows herself to have no knowledge in the area. The sketch appeared on TV only in series three but was revived for the 2000 live tour, wherein the show's title was "PMTV".
- The Fat Women (1990–1998): Living in a country house, they spend their days at the races, drinking whiskey, getting severe injuries and brushing them off as minor incidents. They also insult anybody who interferes in their business.
- The Sound of Music (1993): A segment hosted by Ken and Duane, in which they briefly discussed the history of music as a lead-in to music video parodies. Segments often opened with Ken reading the lyrics to a popular song in a monotone.
- Madonna (1993–2005): Often mentioned, particularly in White Room sketches, and occasionally parodied, such as in spoofs of In Bed with Madonna, "Into the Hollywood Groove", "Me Against the Music", and The English Roses.
- The Stylists (1996–2004): Wardrobe stylist Daniel (Saunders) and hair and makeup artist Terry (French), chain-smoking, flamboyantly gay men who style celebrities (series 5) and assist the Old Masters (series 6).
- Olde Elizabethan Shakespearean Times (1996): Two unhygienic women in Elizabethan England enjoy living a backward peasant way of life, whether cooking disgusting recipes using urine or gossiping about the locals at the pub.
- Junior and Emma (1996–1999): Public school girls who have been abandoned by their parents and stay at school during the holidays.
- Special Effects Specialists (1998–2004): Propsmen who excel in making the worst props ever used in such big-budget films as Titanic, The Lord of the Rings, Star Wars, and Troy.
- Catherine Zeta-Jones (2003–2004): Always refers to herself as "Catherine Spartacus-Zeta-Douglas-Jones" and usually discusses differences between her lifestyle in Wales and in Hollywood.
- Jodie & Jordan Solve Your Problems (2004): Hypersexual cam girls who provide advice to viewers, invariably suggesting they "shag [someone's] brains out".
- Mother and Daughter: A daughter (usually French) gets into an argument with her mother (usually Saunders), often over something insignificant.

== Lananeeneenoonoo ==
Lananeeneenoonoo
- The single cover for "Help!" featuring French, Saunders, and Burke (Lananeeneenoonoo) with the real Bananarama

Background information
- Origin: United Kingdom
- Genre: Pop
- Years active: 1988–1989
- Label: London
- Past members: Dawn French; Jennifer Saunders; Kathy Burke

Lananeeneenoonoo was a British spoof all-girl group consisting of comedians Dawn French, Jennifer Saunders and Kathy Burke. The group, and its name, was a spoof on the popular group Bananarama and was introduced during the 1988 Christmas special of French & Saunders, in which Burke was a guest.

In 1989, along with Bananarama, they created a charity single called "Help!", to raise money for Comic Relief. It was a cover version of the Beatles' song and was released on the London Records label, entering the UK Singles Chart on 25 February 1989 and reaching a high of No. 3. It remained in the chart for nine weeks.

=== The Sugar Lumps ===
French, Saunders and Burke returned for Comic Relief in 1997 as the Sugar Lumps, along with Llewella Gideon and Lulu, to parody the Spice Girls, with whom they performed a version of "Who Do You Think You Are".

== Side projects and other appearances ==
Saunders won international acclaim for writing and playing Edina Monsoon in her sitcom Absolutely Fabulous, based on the French and Saunders sketch "Modern Mother and Daughter". She also guest starred in the American sitcoms Roseanne and Friends, and voiced the wicked Fairy Godmother in the DreamWorks animated film Shrek 2. Saunders wrote and starred in another two BBC sitcoms, Jam and Jerusalem and The Life and Times of Vivienne Vyle. Her other work includes being the face of Barclays Bank and BBC America.

French starred as Geraldine Granger in the highly successful sitcom The Vicar of Dibley, which received great critical acclaim. She also starred in four series of the comedy/crime show Murder Most Horrid, and worked on the films Harry Potter and the Prisoner of Azkaban and The Chronicles of Narnia: The Lion, the Witch and the Wardrobe. French starred in two other BBC shows, Jam and Jerusalem and Lark Rise to Candleford. For many years, French has become popular for her appearances in the Terry's Chocolate Orange adverts by saying her famous line: "It's not Terry's, it's mine!" and voiced the W H Smith and Tesco adverts. In 2009, French released her autobiography Dear Fatty, referring to Saunders, to whom she gave the nickname "Fatty". In 2021, French starred as a little ornament fairy for a M&S Christmas food advert along with its confectionery products mascot, Percy Pig.

=== Featuring French and Saunders ===
- The Comic Strip Presents (1982–2012)
- The Young Ones (1982–1984) (appearing in the episodes "Interesting" and "Time")
- Happy Families (1985)
- Girls on Top (1985–1986)
- Let Them Eat Cake (1999)
- Jam & Jerusalem (2006–2009)
- Coraline (2009)
- Absolutely Fabulous: The Movie (2016)
- Death on the Nile (2022)

=== Featuring French ===
- Murder Most Horrid (1991–1999)
- The Vicar of Dibley (1994–2007)
- Wild West (2002–2004)
- Lark Rise to Candleford (2008–2011)
- Psychoville (2009–2011)
- Roger and Val Have Just Got In (2010–2012)
- The Wrong Mans (2013–2014)
- The Trouble with Maggie Cole (2020)

=== Featuring Saunders ===
- Absolutely Fabulous (1992–2012)
- Mirrorball (2000)
- The Life and Times of Vivienne Vyle (2007)
- Dead Boss (2012)
- Blandings (2013–2014)

== Video and DVD releases ==
=== UK video ===
- French and Saunders: The Video (Best of Series 1 & 2) (1990)
- French and Saunders Live (4 Front Video) (1991)
- French and Saunders: Series 3 (1993)
- French and Saunders at the Movies (Best of Series 4) (1994)

=== UK DVD ===
- French and Saunders Live (Universal) (2001)
- The Best of French and Saunders (or Gentlemen Prefer French and Saunders) (2002)
- French and Saunders at the Movies (also includes the 1999 Christmas Special) (2005)
- French and Saunders: Complete Series 1–6 (2008)
- French and Saunders: Still Alive (2008)

=== USA video ===
- French and Saunders at the Movies (1997)
- Gentlemen Prefer French and Saunders (1997)
- French and Saunders: Ingenue Years (1998)
- French and Saunders: Living in a Material World (1998)

=== USA DVD ===
- Gentlemen Prefer French and Saunders (2002)
- French and Saunders at the Movies (2002)
- French and Saunders: The Ingenue Years (2003)
- French and Saunders: Living in a Material World (2003)
- French and Saunders on the Rocks (2005)
- French and Saunders: Back with a Vengeance (2005)

=== Australian video ===
- French and Saunders: Series 3 – Complete and Un-edited(ish) – (Part One) (1993)
- French and Saunders: The Best of Series 4 (1994)
- French and Saunders: Series 3 – Complete and Un-edited(ish) – (Part Two) (1996)
- French and Saunders: Live (2002)

=== Australian DVD ===
- French and Saunders: Live (2003)
- French and Saunders at the Movies (with 1999 Christmas Special) (2005)
- The Best of French and Saunders (2005)
- French and Saunders: Complete Series 1–6 (2008)
- French and Saunders: Still Alive – The Farewell Tour (2008)
- French And Saunders: Series One Episodes 1–3 (Comedy Bites) (4 March 2010)
- Dawn French Bundle (2011)

== International broadcasters ==
Country	TV Network(s)
Australia	ABC (first runs) UK.TV/The Comedy Channel (repeats)/9Gem
Canada	BBCK on BBC Kids
France	Arte (first runs), Pink TV (France) (repeats)
Germany	EinsFestival, Arte
New Zealand	UK.TV
Portugal	RTP2 (first runs), BBC Prime/BBC Entertainment (repeats)
Singapore	BBC Entertainment
Thailand	BBC Entertainment
United States	BBC America
