= Kevin Turvey =

British television character

Kevin Turvey was a British television comedy character, created by actor and comedian Rik Mayall, who featured in the BBC sketch show A Kick Up the Eighties in 1981.

== A Kick Up the Eighties ==
Turvey, an awkward and socially inept character who spoke with a broad West Midlands accent, was a self-styled "investigative journalist" who still lived with his mother, wore a shapeless blue anorak, fancied a local girl called Theresa Kelly (who was never depicted), and rarely ventured outside his home town of Redditch, north Worcestershire. Each week, his 'investigations' amounted to little more than an over-excited, rambling, uninformed monologue delivered straight to camera, providing absolutely no insight into the subject-matter whatsoever.

The Kevin Turvey segments used as theme music the third movement alla marcia from the Karelia Suite by Sibelius; the first movement, Intermezzo, was the theme of ITV's This Week current affairs programme.

Mayall went uncredited for these appearances, with "Also Featuring: Kevin Turvey" in the end credits rather than his real name. Mayall's then-girlfriend, Lise Mayer, also wrote for these television appearances uncredited.

== The Man Behind the Green Door ==
In 1982 a one-off mockumentary, Kevin Turvey the Man Behind the Green Door was broadcast. In this, a BBC 'fly-on-the-wall' camera crew followed Kevin for a week as he went about his "investigations". Robbie Coltrane played Mick the lodger (who is a deserter from the Army), Ade Edmondson played Kevin's friend Keith Marshall, and Gwyneth Guthrie played Kevin's mum. Roger Sloman appeared as a psychotic park-keeper. Making guest appearances, as part of Kevin's band "20th Century Coyote", were Simon Brint and Rowland Rivron, known as Raw Sex.

== Influences ==
Mayall described Turvey as "an accent and a mood from the West Midlands" where he (Mayall) had grown up (in Droitwich). J. F. Roberts has suggested that Turvey bore some strong similarities to Peter Cook's dullard, know-it-all character E. L. Wisty.

Mayall had previously performed a similar, though slightly differently named, character called 'Kevin Turby', on stage at London's the Comic Strip. Critic Ian Hamilton described Turby's routine:

Kevin's tour de force is a long, intricately plodding monologue about His Average Day. He gets up very late and goes down to Tesco, where he buys some cornflakes, which he then takes home and puts into a plate before sitting down at a table with the flakes in front of him ... etc. 'I was just sitting there eating my cornflakes. I don’t know how many I had had. Fifteen, sixteen, maybe. I wasn’t counting.'
