= List of French and Saunders episodes =

French and Saunders is a British comedy sketch series created by and starring Dawn French and Jennifer Saunders. The series premiered on BBC2 in 1987, and due to its success, it was moved to BBC1 in 1994. For the first four series, it regularly featured Simon Brint and Rowland Rivron as the comedic musical duo Raw Sex. Additional music was provided throughout the show's run by guest-starring musicians, including recurring guest Alison Moyet, and throughout series 3 by Kirsty MacColl. Frequent guest stars included Kevin Allen, Patrick Barlow, Harriet Thorpe and Kathy Burke, with other significant guests including Jane Asher, Lenny Henry (French's then-husband), Patsy Kensit, The Krankies, Lulu and Helen Mirren.

During the course of the programme, 48 episodes of French and Saunders aired, including nine specials over six series, between 9 March 1987 and 27 December 2005.

In addition, the BBC has aired several compilation specials, including the two-part "French and Saunders Go to the Movies"; the two-part "I Can't Believe It's Music"/"I Can't Believe It's Not Music"; the 20th anniversary, six-part series A Bucket o' French and Saunders; and the 30th anniversary special "300 Years of French and Saunders".

== Series overview ==
Series	Episodes	Originally released		
Series	Episodes	First released	Last released	Network
1	6	9 March 1987	13 April 1987	BBC Two
2	6	4 March 1988	15 April 1988	BBC Two
Special	1	28 December 1988		BBC Two
3	7	15 March 1990	26 April 1990	BBC Two
4	7	18 February 1993	1 April 1993	BBC Two
Special	1	30 December 1994		BBC One
5	7	4 January 1996	29 February 1996	BBC One
Specials	6	26 December 1998	26 December 2003	BBC One
6	6	15 October 2004	26 November 2004	BBC One
Special	1	27 December 2005		BBC One

== Episodes ==
=== Series 1 (1987) ===
No. overall	No. in series	Title	Directed by	Written by	Original release date
1	1	"Beauty and the Beast"	Geoff Posner	Dawn French, Jennifer Saunders	9 March 1987
Unpaid intern Dawn plots to seize the limelight. In sketches, Steve Rider has the latest in the Sports Report, and Dawn's A-ha pencil case has been stolen at school. Guest star: Steve Rider; Musical guest: Alison Moyet performing "Ordinary Girl"
2	2	"Tricks"	Kevin Bishop	Dawn French, Jennifer Saunders	16 March 1987
Jennifer tries to carry off a series of circus tricks to no avail. Sketches include parodies of Multi-Coloured Swap Shop and The Bangles, and the first appearance of the extras. Guest star: Roy Castle
3	3	"Julie Walters"	Kevin Bishop	Dawn French, Jennifer Saunders	23 March 1987
Jennifer mistakes the week's special guest, Julie T. Wallace, for Julie Walters. Sketches include the first appearance of the dirty old men. Guest stars: Sharron Davies, Allan Hargreaves, Julie T. Wallace
4	4	"Ratings"	Kevin Bishop	Dawn French, Jennifer Saunders	30 March 1987
With poor ratings threatening their show, Dawn and Jennifer resort to extreme measures and hunt down BBC controller Michael Grade. Sketches include the Menopazzi Sisters and a parody of police procedurals. Guest star: Michael Grade
5	5	"Blue Peter"	Geoff Posner	Dawn French, Jennifer Saunders	6 April 1987
Madame and the Hot Hoofers walk out on the show, forcing Dawn, Jennifer, and Raw Sex to broadcast from the Blue Peter studio. Sketches include a fashion show, and schoolgirls discussing menstruation. Guest stars: Pamela Armstrong, Harry Enfield, Rik Mayall; Musical guest: Jools Holland
6	6	"Killing Time"	Kevin Bishop	Dawn French, Jennifer Saunders	13 April 1987
The curtains come down on the first series of French and Saunders' spoof entertainment show with special guest Joan Armatrading. Guest star: Harriet Thorpe; Musical guest: Joan Armatrading performing "Killing Time"

=== Series 2 (1988) ===
No. overall	No. in series	Title	Directed by	Written by	Original release date
7	1	"Decades"	Kevin Bishop	Dawn French, Jennifer Saunders	4 March 1988
Dawn is handing out some muddled contraceptive advice to Jennifer. Guest star: Joan Bakewell; Musical guests: Squeeze performing "853-5937"
8	2	"Cable TV"	Kevin Bishop	Dawn French, Jennifer Saunders	11 March 1988
The Fat Men get somewhat over-excited while watching the Miss World contest on TV, and there's a sparse audience at a Kilroy spoof. Guest star: Steve O'Donnell; Musical guest: Toyah performing "Because the Night"
9	3	"Removals"	Kevin Bishop	Dawn French, Jennifer Saunders	18 March 1988
Jen and Dawn operate a moving company; a rather senile Katharine Hepburn and Ginger Rogers pay tribute to Fred Astaire. Guest star: Helen Lederer, Mavis Nicholson; Musical guest: Kirsty MacColl performing "Trains and Boats and Planes"
10	4	"Languages"	Kevin Bishop	Dawn French, Jennifer Saunders	25 March 1988
Dawn and Jennifer attempt to learn new languages, and launch a London tour with Raw Sex; schoolgirls take a field trip; a parody of the Pet Shop Boys; Pear Tree Farm supplies a poorly trained cat for a cat food advert. Guest star: Ben Elton
11	5	"Potholing"	Kevin Bishop	Dawn French, Jennifer Saunders	8 April 1988
Dawn and Jennifer undertake a Journey to the Center of the Earth-style exploration of a cave. Other sketches include inactive teenage athletes, a woman who claims to be Elvis' ex-mistress, and a neurotic housewife. Guest stars: Stephanie Beacham, Adrian Edmondson, Lenny Henry; Musical guests: The Proclaimers performing "Make My Heart Fly"
12	6	"Nose"	Kevin Bishop	Dawn French, Jennifer Saunders	15 April 1988
Jennifer visits Dr. French for a nose job. Other sketches include a parody of Jane Seymour, the extras meeting June Whitfield, and a string of Hollywood parodies. Guest stars: Robbie Coltrane, June Whitfield; Musical performances: Lulu performing "The Man Who Sold the World"; Raw Sex performing "Mambo Italiano"; French and Saunders performing "The Way We Were"

=== Christmas special (1988) ===
No.	Title	Directed by	Written by	Original release date
13	"Christmas Special"	Geoff Posner, Bob Spiers	Dawn French, Jennifer Saunders	28 December 1988
Parodies of Christmas movies, hair gel ads, and Bananarama. Guest stars: Kathy Burke, Kevin Godley, Harriet Thorpe, Paula Yates; Musical guest: Alison Moyet performing "Ding Dong Merrily on High"

=== Series 3 (1990) ===
No. overall	No. in series	Title	Directed by	Written by	Original release date
14	1	"The Sound of Music"	Bob Spiers	Dawn French, Jennifer Saunders	15 March 1990
The hills are alive with the sound of French and Saunders as Dawn and Jennifer parody The Sound of Music. Other sketches include parodies of ABBA and Sonia, and the first appearance of Pear Tree Farm. Guest stars: Jerry Hall, Marie Helvin; Musical guest: Kirsty MacColl performing "Fifteen Minutes"
15	2	"Whatever Happened to Baby Dawn?"	Bob Spiers	Dawn French, Jennifer Saunders	22 March 1990
Dawn and Jennifer take on the lead roles of What Ever Happened to Baby Jane? Other sketches include a parody of Bros and two hapless magazine editors. Guest stars: Mac McDonald, Gareth Snook; Musical performance: Kirsty MacColl and Raw Sex performing "Somethin' Stupid"
16	3	"The Exorcist"	Bob Spiers	Dawn French, Jennifer Saunders	29 March 1990
Parodies of The Exorcist and Watchdog; aspiring female rappers; and a publisher and author's lunch meeting. Guest stars: Kathy Burke, Stuart Fell, Maggie Philbin, Lynn Faulds Wood Musical guest: Kirsty MacColl performing "Ride"
18	4	"Gone with the Wind"	Bob Spiers	Dawn French, Jennifer Saunders	12 April 1990
French and Saunders have Gone with the Wind with Jennifer as Scarlett and Dawn as Mammy. Musical guest: Kirsty MacColl performing "Don't Come the Cowboy with Me Sonny Jim!"
17	5	"Dangerous Liaisons"	Bob Spiers	Dawn French, Jennifer Saunders	5 April 1990
Parodies of Dangerous Liaisons, Birds of a Feather, Tanita Tikaram, and The Factory. Guest stars: Kevin Allen, Joan Bakewell, Eleanor Bron, Nigel Planer, Harriet Thorpe
19	6	"Gentlemen Prefer Blondes"	Bob Spiers	Dawn French, Jennifer Saunders	19 April 1990
Parodies of Gentlemen Prefer Blondes and American stand-up comedians; Ken and Duane imagine suing the publisher of an "easy" sheet music book; and "Modern Mother and Daughter", the basis for Absolutely Fabulous. Guest stars: David Gilmour, Mark King, Mark Knopfler, Lemmy, Ralph McTell, Gary Moore, Harriet Thorpe; Musical guest: Kirsty MacColl performing "Still Life"
20	7	"Casting Agency"	Bob Spiers	Dawn French, Jennifer Saunders, Richard Curtis	26 April 1990
Dawn and Jennifer start a casting agency but manage to insult all of their clients. Guest stars: Kevin Allen, Jane Asher, Patrick Barlow, Carl Davis; Musical guest: Sarah Walker performing "I Should Be So Lucky"

=== Series 4 (1993) ===
No. overall	No. in series	Title	Directed by	Written by	Original release date
21	1	"Misery"	Bob Spiers	Dawn French, Jennifer Saunders	18 February 1993
Featuring a memorable reenactment of the film Misery and an exclusive performance by Dickens' Daughters.
22	2	"Silence of the Lambs"	Bob Spiers	Dawn French, Jennifer Saunders	25 February 1993
Parodies of The Silence of the Lambs, The Mamas and the Papas, and Jackie and Joan Collins. Guest stars: Kevin Allen, Christopher Biggins, Bernie Clifton, Roy Hudd, The Krankies, Mavis Nicholson, Jonathan Ross
23	3	"The Seventh Seal"	Bob Spiers	Dawn French, Jennifer Saunders	4 March 1993
The duo pay homage to Swedish filmmaker Ingmar Bergman and rock band Guns N' Roses.
24	4	"In Bed with French and Saunders"	Bob Spiers	Dawn French, Jennifer Saunders	11 March 1993
In Bed with French and Saunders reveals what goes on backstage for two familiar Madonnas. In other sketches, the duo discuss Jerry Hall, examine mail-order catalogues, and parody Fleetwood Mac. Guest star: Jane Asher
25	5	"Aliens"	Bob Spiers	Dawn French, Jennifer Saunders	18 March 1993
Parodies of Alien, Mary Hopkin and Dana; a look at Elizabethan England; and a teenage equestrian. Guest stars: Kevin Allen, Kathy Burke
26	6	"The House of Idiot"	Bob Spiers	Dawn French, Jennifer Saunders	25 March 1993
Parodies of The House of Eliott, Pan's People and Gladiators, and a teenager setting out to circumnavigate the world. Guest stars: Patrick Barlow, Kathy Burke, Stella Gonet, Louise Lombard, Cathy Murphy, Harriet Thorpe
27	7	"Thelma and Louise"	Bob Spiers	Dawn French, Jennifer Saunders	1 April 1993
Dawn and Jennifer's parody of Thelma & Louise becomes all too real. In other sketches, Jennifer learns her lines for a Merchant Ivory film audition, and Darcey Bussell replaces Dawn in Jennifer's new ballet. Guest stars: Darcey Bussell, Anthony Dowell

=== Christmas special (1994) ===
With this episode, French and Saunders moves from BBC Two to BBC One.

No.	Title	Directed by	Written by	Original release date
28	"French and Saunders' Christmas Carol"	Bob Spiers	Dawn French, Jennifer Saunders	30 December 1994
Spoofs of Charles Dickens novels and The Piano. Guest stars: Richard Briers, Kathy Burke, Adrian Edmondson, Geraldine McEwan, Chris Ryan, Harriet Thorpe; Musical guest: Anita Harris performing "Santa Claus Is Coming to Town"

=== Series 5 (1996) ===
No. overall	No. in series	Title	Directed by	Written by	Original release date
29	1	"Baywatch"	John Birkin	Dawn French, Jennifer Saunders	4 January 1996
Spoofs of Baywatch, Lynda La Plante's crime dramas, and Disney's Pocahontas; two flamboyantly gay stylists get the chance to work with Dusty Springfield. Guest stars: Kevin Allen, Patrick Barlow, Lynda La Plante, Janet McTeer, Helen Mirren, Ann Mitchell, Julia Sawalha, Mossie Smith, Dusty Springfield
30	2	"Loveheart"	John Birkin	Dawn French, Jennifer Saunders	11 January 1996
Jennifer and Dawn star with Mel and Sue and Patsy Kensit in a parody of Braveheart. Other sketches include spoofs of Jacqueline Kennedy Onassis and Björk, young chavs experimenting with drugs, and British expatriates in the Emirates. Guest stars: Kevin Allen, Patrick Barlow, Mel Giedroyc, Muriel Gray, Patsy Kensit, Sue Perkins
31	3	"Franco e Sandro"	John Birkin	Dawn French, Jennifer Saunders	18 January 1996
Parodies of Federico Fellini's movies, Noel's House Party, The Cranberries, and Sinéad O'Connor. Guest stars: Sue Barker, Mel Giedroyc, Felicity Kendal, Kate Moss, Sue Perkins
32	4	"Batman"	John Birkin	Dawn French, Jennifer Saunders	25 January 1996
Parodies of Batman Forever and the '60s Batman TV series; Dawn has a Sophia Loren day; another look at Elizabethan times; the stylists return with Kate Moss; and neurotic mothers oversee a playdate. Guest stars: Patrick Barlow, Patsy Kensit, The Krankies, Kate Moss
33	5	"Pulp Fiction"	John Birkin	Dawn French, Jennifer Saunders,	1 February 1996
Dawn and Jen are hired to guard Lulu in a Pulp Fiction spoof. Other sketches include a parody of Céline Dion, oneupsmanship in a doctor's waiting room, and public schoolgirls out of their element as they interview Clare Francis. Guest stars: Clare Francis, Lulu, Kate Moss
34	6	"Pride and Prejudice"	John Birkin	Dawn French, Jennifer Saunders	8 February 1996
A parody of The Quick and the Dead; Court TV airs a legal spin on Star Trek; and Gary Waldhorn stars in a new Jane Austen adaptation. Guest stars: Kevin Allen, Patrick Barlow, Sean Chapman, Lisa Coleman, Mel Giedroyc, Lenny Henry, Rosemary Leach, Sue Perkins, Clarke Peters, Gary Waldhorn
35	7	"Dr. Quimn, Mad Woman"	John Birkin	Dawn French, Jennifer Saunders	29 February 1996
A spoof of Dr. Quinn, Medicine Woman; TV films about Ken & Em and David & Claudia; the chavs recount a rave; and art gallery owners prepare for an exhibition. Guest stars: Mel Giedroyc, Patsy Kensit, Kate Moss, Sue Perkins, Michael Praed

=== Specials (1998–2003) ===
No.	Title	Directed by	Written by	Original release date	UK viewers (millions)
36	"The Making of the Filming of the Making of Titanic"	Edgar Wright	Dawn French, Jennifer Saunders	26 December 1998	10.30
A parody of Titanic and making-of specials, accompanied by spoofs of high-concept game shows and The Corrs. Guest stars: Adrian Edmondson, Helen Lederer, Joanna Lumley, Spice Girls, Maggie Steed, Harriet Thorpe, Gary Waldhorn
37	"Witless Silence"	Steve Bendelack	Dawn French, Jennifer Saunders	2 May 1999	<6.11
A Bank Holiday special features an acting masterclass and a murder investigation, Witless Silence. Guest stars: Kathy Burke, William Franklyn, Helen Mirren, Robert Pugh, David Vine
38	"French and Saunders: The Phantom Millennium"	Dominic Brigstocke, Steve Bendelack	Dawn French, Jennifer Saunders	28 December 1999	8.10
Dawn and Jennifer take on Star Wars: Episode I – The Phantom Menace, Martine McCutcheon, Diana Ross and Melanie C.
39	"The Egg"	Ed Bye	Dawn French, Jennifer Saunders	29 March 2002	6.05
Dawn and Jennifer star in their own version of The Lord of the Rings, in which they search for an Oscar. Also features parodies of Bono and Sophie Ellis-Bextor.
40	"Celebrity Christmas Puddings"	Tristram Shapeero	Dawn French, Jennifer Saunders	25 December 2002	8.02
Dawn and Jennifer house-sit for Richard and Judy and offer new angles on Monarch of the Glen and Tipping the Velvet.
41	"French and Saunders Actually"	Nick Wood	Dawn French, Jennifer Saunders	26 December 2003	<5.88
Parodies of The White Stripes, Madonna and Rosemary & Thyme, and a Christmas message from Catherine Zeta-Jones. (Note: Although the title references Love Actually, it is not parodied in the special.) Guest stars: Pam Ferris, Felicity Kendal, John Nettles, Lesley Vickerage, Alan Yentob

=== Series 6 (2004) ===
No. overall	No. in series	Title	Directed by	Written by	Original release date	UK viewers (millions)
42	1	"Back at the BBC"	Ed Bye	Dawn French, Jennifer Saunders	15 October 2004	6.42
Dawn and Jennifer meet their new producer, Liza Tarbuck, and sign a contract, unwittingly locking themselves into a six-part series deal. Sketches include cam girls Jodie & Jordan discussing mortgages, and Nicole Kidman's audio commentary for Cold Turkey. Guest stars: Brenda Cowling, Darren Day, Eileen Essell, Maggie Steed
43	2	"Three-Letter Words"	Ed Bye	Dawn French, Jennifer Saunders	22 October 2004	5.54
Dawn tries to find the perfect chocolate lime; the two discuss the prevalence of online porn; Eve Pollard arrives as the BBC's new Director General; Pear Tree Farm is forced to diversify their business; Catherine Zeta-Jones discusses fashion; a parody of Cher. Guest stars: Brenda Cowling, Eileen Essell, Eve Pollard
44	3	"The Queen"	Ed Bye	Dawn French, Jennifer Saunders	29 October 2004	<4.70
Liza pushes Jen and Dawn to finish their first script, while Jen prepares for an award at the palace, and Dawn is distressed by both her lack of award and Mark Lamarr's rudeness. Sketches include parodies of Kill Bill and Most Haunted, Catherine Zeta-Jones on crowns, and the stylists assisting Sandro Botticelli. Guest stars: Brenda Cowling, Eileen Essell, Mark Lamarr
45	4	"Offers"	Ed Bye	Dawn French, Jennifer Saunders	5 November 2004	<5.00
Dawn, Jennifer, and Liza pitch their ideas for new shows during the BBC's internal "offers" process, including a modernized version of Shakespeare's King Lear. Other sketches include Madonna's new children's book, Jodie and Jordan on eyeglasses, and the stylists assisting Édouard Manet. Guest stars: Basil Brush, Michelle Collins, Brian Cox, Brenda Cowling, Roger Griffiths, Amanda Holden, Derren Litten, Matt Lucas, Denise Van Outen, David Walliams, Ruby Wax, Marc Wootton
46	5	"Minutes"	Ed Bye	Dawn French, Jennifer Saunders	12 November 2004	<4.83
Dawn and Jennifer struggle to demonstrate how much writing they've finished. Sketches include a spoof of Edward Scissorhands, Jodie and Jordan on peeling potatoes, British expatriates discussing Indonesia, Catherine Zeta-Jones on roundabouts, the making of Troy, and Dawn's fantasy of singing with Anastacia. Guest stars: Anastacia, Brenda Cowling, Eileen Essell, Tim Wylton
47	6	"After Show Party"	Ed Bye	Dawn French, Jennifer Saunders	26 November 2004	<4.40
Episode one of the new series starts filming. Dawn and Jennifer delay production, through a combination of laziness and constantly getting lost, but meet with an allegedly ill teenager and his mother. Sketches include retirees who move to Florida, Dawn babysitting for a giant, and Chris Martin's mum. Guest stars: Pauline McLynn, Maggie Steed

=== Christmas special (2005) ===
No.	Title	Directed by	Written by	Original release date	UK viewers (millions)
48	"Celebrity Christmas Special"	Ed Bye	Dawn French, Jennifer Saunders	27 December 2005	6.06
Dr Tanya Byron attempts to rope in the increasingly "childish" Dawn and Jennifer. Features parodies of Vera Drake and Elton John. Guest stars: Kacey Ainsworth, Tanya Byron, John Humphrys, Janette Krankie, Sally Phillips, Shane Richie, Rufus Wainwright, Jessie Wallace

== Compilation specials ==
Between 1995 and 2007, several compilation specials were broadcast on BBC One; first with a two-part special, consisting of highlights of sketches featuring movie parodies, then a subsequent two-part special encompassing the music parodies. This was followed by a seven-part 20th Anniversary retrospective, "A Bucket o' French and Saunders", featuring classic clips with the addition of new material, as well as a similar, stand-alone special, "300 Years of French and Saunders", which commemorated 30 years of the series.

=== "French and Saunders Go to the Movies" (1995) ===
No. in series	Title	Directed by	Written by	Original release date
1	"French and Saunders Go to the Movies (Part 1)"	Unknown	Dawn French, Jennifer Saunders	31 March 1995
2	"French and Saunders Go to the Movies (Part 2)"	Unknown	Dawn French, Jennifer Saunders	7 June 1995

=== Music specials (2005) ===
No. in series	Title	Directed by	Written by	Original release date	UK viewers (millions)
1	"I Can't Believe It's Music"	Unknown	Dawn French, Jennifer Saunders	1 April 2005	4.36
A compilation of music parody performances seen through the series, including ABBA and The White Stripes.
2	"I Can't Believe It's Not Music"	Unknown	Dawn French, Jennifer Saunders	7 April 2005	<4.77
Featuring parodies of Alanis Morissette, The Bangles, Boyzone, and Guns N' Roses.

=== A Bucket o' French and Saunders (2007) ===
A Bucket o' French and Saunders was shown from 7 September till 5 October (the sixth episode not being shown). The series was shown as a retrospective, showing 20 years of the French and Saunders sketch show. The older material was interspersed with new sketches, which had been recorded in June 2007 at BBC Television Centre. New material included parodies of America's Next Top Model, The Apprentice, Gordon Ramsay's The F-Word, The Academy Awards (featuring a cameo appearance by Helen Mirren), X Factor, Big Brother, Fame Academy and a parody of disgraced celebrities Amy Winehouse and Britney Spears.

No. in series	Title	Directed by	Written by	Original release date	UK viewers (millions)
1	"Episode 1"	Unknown	Dawn French, Jennifer Saunders	7 September 2007	4.07
Episode 1 sees the return of the hapless documentary presenter (Joanna Lumley), introducing the sketches. Old Material: "Who is it?"/Dawn's entrances; the fat men; ABBA; "History of Dance": the '60s; Marilyn and Jane; The Exorcist; the extras; Britney and Madonna (remixed); Titanic; Dawn at the doctor; the teenagers; a montage of old clips set to The Black Eyed Peas' "My Humps". New material: "The F-Word".
2	"Episode 2"	Unknown	Dawn French, Jennifer Saunders	14 September 2007	4.11
Old material: Stealing a BAFTA; The Menopazzi Sisters; Dancing; "Cassie's Dance Audition" (featuring Harriet Thorpe); a montage of Jen's reactions to Dawn; "Generation Gap" (featuring Julia Sawalha); Presenters Academy (featuring Davina McCall); Dana, Mary Hopkin, Dickens' Daughters, The Mamas and the Papas, George Michael and Boy George; Florida retirees; The Sound of Music; montage set to Arctic Monkeys' "I Bet You Look Good on the Dancefloor". New material: "The French and Saunders Academy Awards", featuring Dame Helen Mirren.
3	"Episode 3"	Unknown	Dawn French, Jennifer Saunders	21 September 2007	<3.87
Old material: Alien, Gone with the Wind, Cold Turkey, Loveheart and Silence of the Lambs; "Look at my baby!"; The Poo Stripes, Boyzone and Aimless Morris-Minor; Chris Martin's mother; West Country Maids; women's programming; "Lucky Bitches"; "History of Dance": the '20s and the '90s; montage set to Gorillaz' "Feel Good Inc.". New material: "Reality TV Tour", featuring Sir Alan Sugar, Tyra Banks and Simon Cowell.
4	"Episode 4"	Unknown	Dawn French, Jennifer Saunders	28 September 2007	<3.99
Old material: Dawn's entrance; Bros on Star Test; "Nibbles" (featuring Lenny Henry and Adrian Edmondson); the extras at the Tate Modern; Witless Silence; Batman (featuring Patsy Kensit); Star Wars; the fat women; Jackie and Brigitte (featuring Tanya Byron); Elton John with Kiki Dee; montages set to Basement Jaxx' "Where's Your Head At?" and Just Jack's "Stars in Their Eyes". New material: Dawn as a meter checker; Amy Winehouse and Britney Spears.
5	"Episode 5 (Note: Due to low ratings, the series' run was shortened, and the original episodes five and six were edited down together into one show. As a result, the broadcast scheduled for November was cancelled, and episode 7 was the sixth to air. Surprisingly, none of the leftover new material (including a Doctor Who parody, their second spoof of the show and also their second never to air) made it into the following Christmas special.)"	Unknown	Dawn French, Jennifer Saunders	5 October 2007	<3.91
Old material: Lananeeneenoonoo; Catherine Zeta-Jones; "Hurrah for Hollywood"; horse riding; Kill Bill; Dot and May; Pulp Fiction; Thelma & Louise; montages set to Lulu's "Shout" and Dawn and Jennifer's rendition of "The Way We Were". New material: Location, Relocation, Property Under the Sun, featuring Kirstie Allsopp; Big Brother in the French and Saunders House.
6	"Episode 7"	Unknown	Dawn French, Jennifer Saunders	24 December 2007	<5.40
Old material: Dawn models with Kate Moss; the fat men at Christmas; the fat women at Christmas; "Don't Sit There!"; "La Belle dame sans chapeau" (with Darcey Bussell); Whatever Happened to Baby Dawn?; the chamber maids; Richard and Judy's house; "Ding Dong Merrily on High" with Alison Moyet; prosthetics; computer troubles; Cher; "Ride"; Imagine... Parkour (with Alan Yentob); Catherine Zeta-Jones' Christmas message; "History of Dance"; F&S in prison; Christmas in the White Room; opera divas (featuring Sarah Walker performing "I Should Be So Lucky"); montage set to Shirley Bassey and The Propellerheads' "History Repeating". New material: White Room: "Still can't get in to the BBC".

=== "300 Years of French and Saunders" (2017) ===
No. in series	Title	Directed by	Written by	Original release date	UK viewers (millions)
1	"300 Years of French and Saunders"	Unknown	Dawn French, Jennifer Saunders	25 December 2017	4.66
A special thirtieth-anniversary clip show combining new material, greatest hits, rarities and previously unreleased footage. Guest stars: Lorna Brown, Jack Farthing, Victoria Graham, Lulu, Joanna Lumley, Eleanor Tomlinson

== Other appearances ==
- Alison Moyet – "Love Letters" promo video (1987)
- Jim Henson's The Storyteller – "Sapsorrow" (1988)
- Hysteria 2 (Channel 4, 1989)
- The Secret Policeman's Biggest Ball – ITV (Central), Standup/sketch (1989)
- Little Pig Robinson (Beatrix Potter) (1990)
- French and Saunders Live! (video, 1990)
- Hysteria III (Channel 4, 1991)
- Amnesty International's Big 30 (ITV, 1991)
- Dusty Springfield – Full Circle (BBC documentary, 1994)
- "Dawn", a parody of Oprah-style chat-shows featuring Dawn French and Victoria Wood (sketch, 1995)

=== Comic Relief ===
- Comic Relief (1988)
- Comic Relief 2: A Night of Comic Relief 2 (1989)
- Bananarama & Lananeeneenoonoo – Help! Promo video (Comic Relief single) (1989)
- Bananarama & Lananeeneenoonoo – Help! Comic Relief '89 Live performance (1989)
- Comic Relief '91: F&S and Birds of a Feather – Mistaken Identity (1991)
- Comic Relief' 93: Total Relief (1993)
- Comic Relief '95: The Night of Comic Relief (BBC, Sketch/standup) (1995)
- Comic Relief '97 (1997)
- Spice Girls & The Sugar Lumps – Who Do You Think You Are – Promo video (Comic Relief) (1997)
- Comic Relief Special (Video Only) – The Extras On Doctor Who (unaired extended sketch recorded 13 years previously for series 1 episode 6 and eventually released as a short special as part of the Doctor Who Comic Relief video compilation) (2000)
- Comic Relief Special – Harry Potter and The Secret Chamberpot of Azerbaijan (2003)
- Comic Relief Special – Gimme, Gimme, Gimmick (Mamma Mia: The Movie) (13 March 2009)
- Comic Relief Special – French and Saunders' Carpool Karaoke (24 March 2017)
- Comic Relief Special - Mamma Mia! Here We Go YET Again (15 March 2019)
- Comic Relief Special - French & Saunders and Dame Judi Dench visit The Repair Shop (March 18, 2022)
