= Teenage Kicks (TV series) =

- Created by: Adrian Edmondson; Nigel Smith
- Starring: Adrian Edmondson; Ed Coleman; Laura Aikman; Jonathon Chan-Pensley; Mark Arden
- Theme music composer: John O'Neill
- Opening theme: "Teenage Kicks" by The Undertones
- Composer: Simon Brint (incidental)
- Country of origin: United Kingdom
- No. of series: 1
- No. of episodes: 8

Production
- Producer: Joan Schneider
- Running time: 30 minutes

Original release
- Network: ITV
- Release: 28 March – 16 May 2008

Teenage Kicks is a British sitcom starring Adrian Edmondson, Ed Coleman and Laura Aikman, filmed at Teddington Studios. Originally as a radio show for BBC Radio 2 in 2007, it was turned into a television series by Phil McIntyre Productions for ITV. The show ran for eight episodes beginning 28 March 2008, although the show was not recommissioned for any further series.

The opening theme tune is "Teenage Kicks" by The Undertones.

== Cast ==
- Adrian Edmondson as Vernon Heath
- Ed Coleman as Max Heath
- Laura Aikman as Milly Heath
- Jonathon ChanasPensley as David
- Mark Arden as Bryan

== Plot ==
Vernon Heath (Edmondson) is a 49-year-old former front man for a punk rock band called "The Plague". After living off his wife for the last two decades and spending most of his time in the pub, the two are getting a divorce, and Vernon is forced to move into a student flat in Kilburn, London, occupied by his children Max (Ed Coleman) and Milly (Laura Aikman), as well as their flatmate David (Jonathan Chan-Pensley). Vernon believes that moving in with them will rekindle his old world. However, Max, Milly and David are disgusted by him, and his best friend and former Plague member Bryan (Mark Arden) appears to have "sold out", now working as a deputy head teacher of a primary school and happily married.

== Production ==
The original radio series was broadcast on BBC Radio 2, recorded in The Drill Hall in late 2006. Originally a pilot was to be made for BBC Two. However, ITV took control of the project and commissioned eight episodes. Paul Jackson, ITVs director of entertainment and comedy said, "From the moment I arrived in this job I have made it my mission to bring quality sitcom back to ITV, this project absolutely does that and I'm very excited about having Ade back on our screens."

A pilot version of the first episode was shot in 2007 with the notable difference of Ben Elton in the role of Bryan, the same role he had played in the original radio version. Elton was replaced by Mark Arden in the transmitted version and the following episodes for reasons unknown.

== Reception ==
The show has been seen as Edmondson's return to TV comedy (following his straight role in Holby City), with the character of Vernon being compared to that of Vyvyan, a similar punk character he played in the BBC TV sitcom The Young Ones. The first episode's preview in The Guardian TV listings was scathing, describing the programme as a "graceless gumbo of mainstream sentimentality and Bottom-esque cruelty... roaring awfulness." Concluding: "Tonight's episode [sees]... Chinese flatmate mocked for having a Chinese accent. Unbelievable."

Ade Edmondson looking back on the show, said he enjoyed writing it but had a hard time getting it made. It was pushed back many times by the BBC while "they were playing musical chairs" until BBC 2 picked up on it, then ITV did later for its TV adaption. Before the broadcast run, the cast including Edmondson were told that if the series averaged 4 million a second series would be commissioned, but fell short with 3.4 which Edmondson explained as being "fair". Only the first two episodes ranked in ITV 1's top 30 weekly BARB ratings at positions 25 and 26.

== Episodes ==
| No. | Title | Directed by | Original release date | UK viewers (millions) |
|---|---|---|---|---|
| 1 | "Sex" | Dewi Humphreys | 28 March 2008 | 3.6 |
| 2 | "Work" | Dewi Humphreys | 4 April 2008 | 3.8 |
| 3 | "Sorry" | Dewi Humphreys | 11 April 2008 | 3.4 |
| 4 | "Health" | Dewi Humphreys | 18 April 2008 | 2.5 |
| 5 | "Student" | Dewi Humphreys | 25 April 2008 | 2.4 |
| 6 | "Fame" | Dewi Humphreys | 2 May 2008 | 2.4 |
| 7 | "Exodus" | Dewi Humphreys | 9 May 2008 | 2 |
| 8 | "Goodbye Cruel Worm" | Dewi Humphreys | 16 May 2008 | 1.7 |
