= The Dales (TV programme) =

2011 British TV series

- Genre: Travel
- Presented by: Ade Edmondson
- Country of origin: United Kingdom
- Original language: English
- No. of series: 3
- No. of episodes: 36

Production
- Running time: 30 minutes (inc. adverts)
- Production company: Shiver Productions

Original release
- Network: ITV
- Release: 28 March 2011 – 5 August 2013

The Dales is a British travel documentary show that aired on ITV from 28 March 2011 to 5 August 2013 and was hosted by Ade Edmondson.

Amanda Owen ("The Yorkshire Shepherdess") and her family appeared as regulars on this series, with the family in the first series including Amanda and husband Clive, plus young children Raven, Reuben, Miles, Edith and Violet.

The Owens appeared on The Dales alongside the Reverend Ann Chapman, the vicar of four small churches in Yorkshire, mother and son farmers Philip and Carol Mellin, and Izzy Lane, known for her sustainable wool fashion business.

The programme was repeated on Together TV in 2021 and was added to the My5 streaming catalogue alongside Our Yorkshire Farm and New Lives in the Wild.
