= How to Be a Complete Bastard =

1986 book

How to be a Complete Bastard is a 1986 book by Adrian Edmondson, Mark Leigh and Mike Lepine. ISBN 0-86369-182-X ISBN 978-0863691829

The book was a spin-off from Adrian Edmondson's character Sir Adrian Dangerous one of the Dangerous Brothers, a TV and stage show performed with Rik Mayall and contained a selection of ways to be a "complete bastard" to those around you. Some examples are:

- "How to be a Bastard Student:" Join the Free Nelson Mandela Society today to claim your free Nelson Mandela. (note: at the time of publication nearly every UK university had a society of that name campaigning for the release of Nelson Mandela)
- "How to be a Bastard Parent:" Things babies are good for: Filling their pants with shit. (That's about it really) What to do if baby cries: 1) Put on an Iron Maiden album 2) Listen to it at full volume
- "How to be a Complete Bastard to the Deaf:" Go like this: (sequence of cartoons depicting sign language alphabet gestures spelling "FUCK OFF") Alternatively, go like this: (single cartoon depicting V-sign gesture)

It was followed up with How to be a Complete Bitch by Pamela Stephenson with Leigh and Lepine in 1987, and The Complete Bastard's Book of the Worst, again written by Edmondson, in 1988.

The book was also turned into a video game for ZX Spectrum, Amstrad CPC and Commodore 64, as well as a board game published by Paul Lamond Games Ltd.
