= Amanda Owen =

English shepherd and writer (born 1974)

- Born: September 1974 (age 52)
- Other names: Yorkshire Shepherdess; Amanda Jayne Livingstone
- Years active: 2011-present
- Spouse: Clive Owen (m. 2000; sep. 2022)
- Children: 9
- Writing career
- Genre: Pastoral
- Notable work: The Yorkshire Shepherdess
- Website: www.yorkshireshepherdess.com

Amanda Jayne Owen (née Livingstone; born September 1974) is an English shepherdess, writer and presenter.

== Personal life ==
Owen lives and works on a remote farm, Ravenseat Farm, in Swaledale in the Yorkshire Dales. She has nine children.

In 2022, Owen separated from her husband Clive after 22 years of marriage.

== Books ==
Owen first gained attention through her Twitter feed as "The Yorkshire Shepherdess", which led to her writing a book of the same title.

Owen has written five books:

1. The Yorkshire Shepherdess (2015)
2. A Year in the Life of the Yorkshire Shepherdess (2016)
3. Adventures of the Yorkshire Shepherdess
4. Tales From the Farm
5. Celebrating The Seasons (28 October 2021, ISBN 978-1529056853)

== Television and radio ==
In 2009, Owen and her family appeared in Episode 3 (Eden and the Pennines) of the BBC series Wainwright Walks: Coast to Coast with Julia Bradbury (at 22 minutes). They first appeared as regulars on Adrian Edmondson's 2011 ITV documentary series The Dales (repeated on Together TV in 2021), alongside the Reverend Ann Chapman, the vicar of four small churches, and a number of other people living in the Yorkshire Dales. At that point, the Owen family consisted of Amanda, Clive and their five young children.

In November 2015, the family appeared in an episode of New Lives In The Wild UK with Ben Fogle, a Channel 5 programme which is made by Warner Brothers' Renegade Pictures. Their appearance led to their own observational documentary series following life on the Owens' farm on Channel 5 called Our Yorkshire Farm, which has become one of the channel's most popular programmes with over three million viewers watching each episode since it was first broadcast on 27 November 2018, narrated by actor Ralf Little. On 16 February 2021, Channel 5 broadcast the first episode of series 14 of Ben Fogle: Return to the Wild, which saw Fogle back at Ravenseat Farm after six years, where he met their youngest child Nancy (who was born since his last visit) for the first time.

In August 2017, she appeared on BBC Radio 4's The Museum of Curiosity. Her hypothetical donation to this imaginary museum was a shepherd's whistle, used to communicate with her sheep dogs. On 14 July 2019 she was the subject of Radio 4's On Your Farm. On 10 July 2021, she appeared as the featured guest on Radio 4's The Poet Laureate Has Gone To His Shed with Simon Armitage.

In November 2021, Owen was one of the four walkers travelling with the BBC's 360 degree camera, in series two of BBC Four's Winter Walks. with Owen's episode featuring a walk through Wensleydale and Raydale.

Owen also filmed a couple of reports for Live: Winter on the Farm broadcast on Channel 5 between 6–9 December 2021. Reuben Owen also filmed a feature for this series and appeared on the last episode of the series, joining The Yorkshire Vet's Shona Searson and Manchester chocolatier Sarah Gallacher at Cannon Hall Farm with Rob and Dave Nicholson.

In 2022, Leeds-based Wise Owl Films hired Owen to present a new farming series which would join farm-based programmes like Matt Baker: Our Farm in the Dales in More4's schedules. Unlike Baker's Dales series or her Channel 5 programme, she will visit other farms in Amanda Owen's Extraordinary Farming Lives, set to be a six-part series of 60 minute programmes.

In November 2022, Channel 5 confirmed that Our Yorkshire Farm would not be returning to the channel in its original form, with a three-part spin-off programme called Beyond The Yorkshire Farm: Reuben & Clive due to be launched on the channel on 6 December 2022. This spin-off series will show the father and son duo launching a digging business venture alongside Reuben's friend Tom McWhirter and Reuben's girlfriend Sarah Dow, which sees them in the Cumbrian village of Langwathby digging out a series of ponds.

In 2024, Channel 5 confirmed that another spin-off Reuben: Life in the Dales will be broadcast in April 2024 which once again will see the trio from the previous spin-off series and the first episode was broadcast on 25 April 2024.

In September 2024, Channel 4 commissioned four series of Our Farm Next Door: Amanda, Clive and Kids a ten-part series featuring herself, her ex-husband Clive and their fully grown-up children renovating a derelict farmhouse and the first episode of the first series was broadcast on 14 October 2024 followed by the second series on 29 April 2025 and the third series on 19 January 2026. The fourth and final series is scheduled to air on 5 October 2026.

== Ravenseat Farm ==
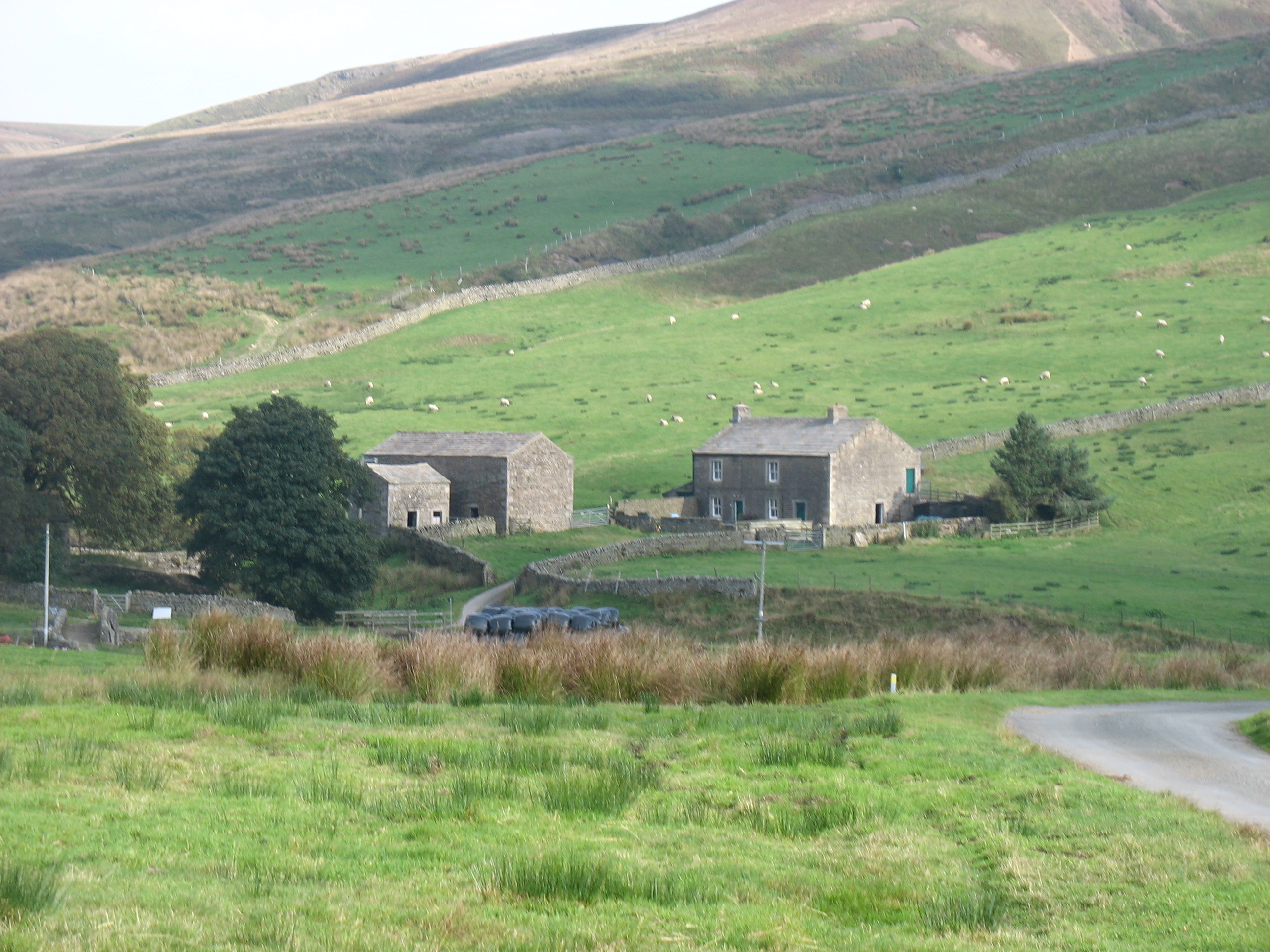
Ravenseat Farm in Swaledale, home of Amanda Owen and family

Ravenseat Farm is a working hill farm located in Whitsun Dale at the top of Swaledale. The nearest village is Keld in North Yorkshire, and the nearest town is Kirkby Stephen in Cumbria. It is predominantly a sheep farm of 2000 acres; as of summer 2016 there were about 900 sheep and 30 cattle.

The place name was apparently not recorded before the first edition of the Ordnance Survey in 1860. The name must have been given first to the summit on Ravenseat Moor. Seat is a dialect word for summit. Place names in the North of England that include the element seat or side are usually derived from Old Norse saeter, seter or setr (elevated summer pasture).

=== Landscape features around the farm ===
Derived from Old Norse saeter (elevated summer pasture).

- Ravenseat Moor
- Robert's Seat
- Old Side Top
- Side Edge

Derived from Old Norse dalr (valley).

- Swaledale
- Birk Dale
- Whitsun Dale

Derived from Old Norse bekkr (stream or river).

- Whitsundale Beck
- Hoods Bottom Beck

Derived from Old Norse foss (waterfall).

- High Force
- Jenny Whalley's Force

== See also ==
- The Radford family – another large family featured in a Channel 5 documentary (22 Kids and Counting)
