= Guest House Paradiso =

1999 British black comedy film

- British theatrical release poster
- Directed by: Adrian Edmondson
- Written by: Adrian Edmondson; Rik Mayall
- Based on: Bottom by Adrian Edmondson; Rik Mayall
- Produced by: Phil McIntyre
- Starring: Adrian Edmondson; Rik Mayall
- Cinematography: Alan Almond
- Edited by: Sean Barton
- Music by: Colin Towns
- Production companies: PolyGram Films International; Samuelson Productions
- Distributed by: Universal Pictures International
- Release date: 3 December 1999
- Running time: 86 minutes
- Country: United Kingdom
- Language: English
- Budget: £3 million
- Box office: £1.8 million; $500,000

Guest House Paradiso is a 1999 British comedy film written by and starring comic duo Rik Mayall and Adrian Edmondson.

The film is a spin-off of their BBC comedy television series Bottom. Mayall and Edmondson reprise their roles from the series respectively as Richie and Eddie, now with different surnames and relocated to a new setting. The plot was inspired by their various hotel stays as they toured while performing Bottom Live throughout the 1990s. Mayall and Edmondson jointly wrote the film; initially, they planned to codirect, but after Mayall was involved in a significant accident prior to filming, Edmondson decided to handle directing duties marking it as his feature directorial debut. As of 2026, this remains Edmondson's sole directorial credit for a feature film.

Guest House Paradiso utilises the Richie and Eddie characters from Bottom in a different scenario to that of the television series, with Mayall comparing it to Laurel and Hardy's practice of reusing the same characters and placing them in new situations. In the film, Richie (Mayall) and Eddie (Edmondson) are proprietors of a cheap and rundown guest house on the Isle of Wight called the Guest House Paradiso. After an exodus of customers, the two see their fortunes reverse when a famous Italian film star (Hélène Mahieu) arrives, on the run from her sadistic boyfriend (Vincent Cassel).

Filming took place between April and May 1999 at Ealing Studios and on location on the Isle of Wight. The soundtrack, composed by musician Colin Towns, showcased a uniquely "anarchic" sound and was comprised entirely of jazz. The film's set design took inspiration from French cinema and its climactic sequence, featuring several characters vomiting following the consumption of radioactive fish salvaged from a nearby nuclear power plant, has been described as "one of the longest and most involved mass puking scenes ever" by The New York Times.

Produced by PolyGram Films International on a budget of £3 million and distributed by Universal Pictures International, Guest House Paradiso released on 3 December 1999 to negative reviews and failed to recoup its budget at the box office. Though plans existed for further films, Mayall and Edmondson instead chose to reprise their roles for two additional stage shows, before dissolving their partnership thereafter.

== Plot ==
Richard "Richie" Twat and Edward "Eddie" Elizabeth Ndingombaba run the Guest House Paradiso, the worst guest house in the United Kingdom. Following a staff exodus, the hotel begins rapidly bleeding customers, until the arrival of the Nice family, headed by Mr. Nice, and the famous Italian actress Gina Carbonara, on the run from her ill-tempered and criminal fiancé, Gino Bolognese, reverse their fortunes.

Due to the chef stealing all the food, Richie and Eddie resort to collecting radioactive fish salvaged from the nearby nuclear power station's lorries to serve for supper. Meanwhile, Gino tracks down Gina thanks to her residency being promoted to attract more guests. After convincing Gina to a sudden elopement, Gino then tries to rape her. However, after having consumed the radioactive fish, Gino, and the other guests at the hotel, suddenly grow violently ill. After discovering the disastrous effects their dinner is having, Richie and Eddie prepare their escape, but not before rescuing Gina from Gino. Gino proceeds to get caught in the crossfire of the projectile-vomiting guests, which pushes him out a window and off a cliff, where he meets his demise.

Just before they can flee, government agents arrive, intending to enact a cover-up, and offer Richie and Eddie £10 million, first-class tickets to the Caribbean, and new identities for them and Gina, in exchange for their silence, which they promptly accept. In a post-credits scene, the three are at a beach bar called the Beach Bar Paradiso, where Eddie winks to the camera and says only Gino died, otherwise there'd be "a moral question-mark hanging over our escape."

== Cast ==
- Rik Mayall as Richard "Richie" Twat
- Adrian Edmondson as Edward "Eddie" Elizabeth Ndingombaba
- Vincent Cassel as Gino Giuseppe Bolognese
- Hélène Mahieu as Gina Tortellini Carbonara
- Bill Nighy as Mr. Johnson
- Kate Ashfield as Ms. Hardy
- Simon Pegg as Mr. Nice
- Fenella Fielding as Mrs. Foxfur
- Lisa Palfrey as Mrs. Nice
- Jess Mann as Charlene Nice
- Steve O'Donnell as Chef Lardy Barsto
- James D'Arcy as Newly Wedded Husband
- Kate Loustau as Newly Wedded Wife
- Paul Garcia as Screen Lover
- Sophia Myles, Emma Pierson, and Anna Madeley as Saucy Wood Nymphs

French actors Hélène Mahieu and Vincent Cassel play Italian couple Gina Carbonara and Gino Bolognese, respectively. Mahieu had gained fame at the time for headlining "an innuendo-filled series of adverts for Renault's new Clio car". Seeing it as an opportunity to do something new, Cassel happily accepted the role of the film's main antagonist and recalled enjoying the experience.

Simon Pegg plays Mr. Nice, patriarch of the Nice family that visit the hotel; cast in the role shortly after he finished filming the first series of Spaced, Pegg, a fan of Mayall and Edmondson's work since he was a child, conversed with Mayall about The Young Ones during filming. Fenella Fielding, an alumna of the Carry On films, which Mayall and Edmondson were fond of, plays Mrs. Foxfur, an elderly hotel patron, along with Bill Nighy and Kate Ashfield as an adulterous couple who briefly stay at the Guest House Paradiso. Near the beginning of the film, Steven O'Donnell makes a cameo appearance as a drunken Greek chef named Lardy Barsto, having previously played the recurring character Spudgun in Bottom.

== Production ==
=== Development ===
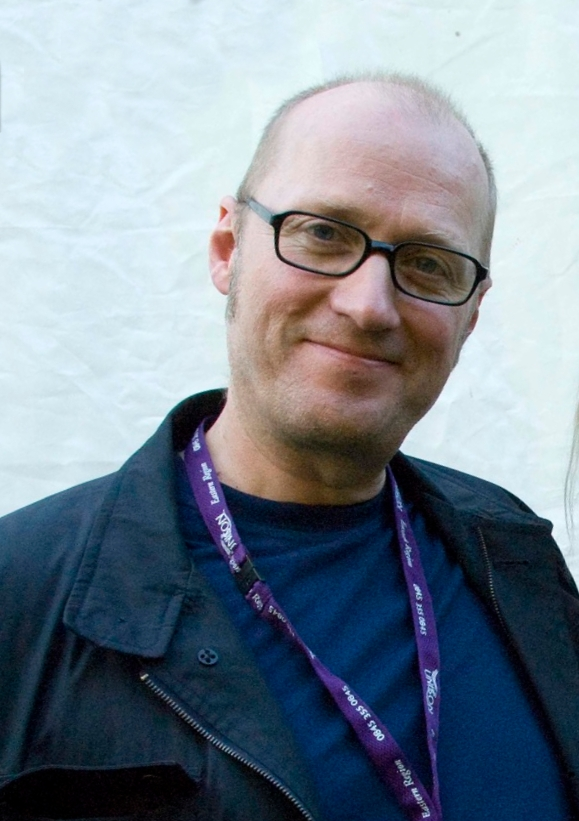
Due to Rik Mayall suffering a near-fatal accident prior to filming, Adrian Edmondson (pictured in 2008) handled directing duties for the film.

Guest House Paradiso was inspired by the various hotel stays Mayall and Edmondson had during their Bottom Live shows, prompting the duo to devise a situation where their characters would run one. As they were writing the script for this film, Mayall suffered a near-fatal quad bike accident in 1998 that fractured his skull and left him unresponsive for some time, although he would eventually recover.

During Mayall's recovery, Edmondson and him finished the script for the film, further reworking it to reduce its length, which Mayall estimated to have been nearly four hours long in its conception. They worked on several rewrites together, although Edmondson alone oversaw the final draft. It was not conceived as a direct film adaptation of the television series. Instead, the film features the same characters of Richie and Eddie, but placed in a new situation, with Mayall comparing them to Laurel and Hardy who "would stride onto the screen and sometimes they’d be in a policeman’s uniform, or they might be in foreign legion outfits or convicts".

The title references Hotel Paradiso (1966) and Cinema Paradiso (1988). The film borrows from Raiders of the Lost Ark (1981), with its climactic flee from a giant ball of vomit, Monsieur Hulot's Holiday (1953), with the dining-room doors replicating sounds featured in it, and Un chant d'amour (1950), for how its protagonists communicate through a wall, which Guest House Paradiso takes inspiration from. Though a scene where Richie and Eddie misunderstand what an "undressed" salad entails bears similarities with a Laurel and Hardy bit, Edmondson said he was unaware of it.

=== Filming ===
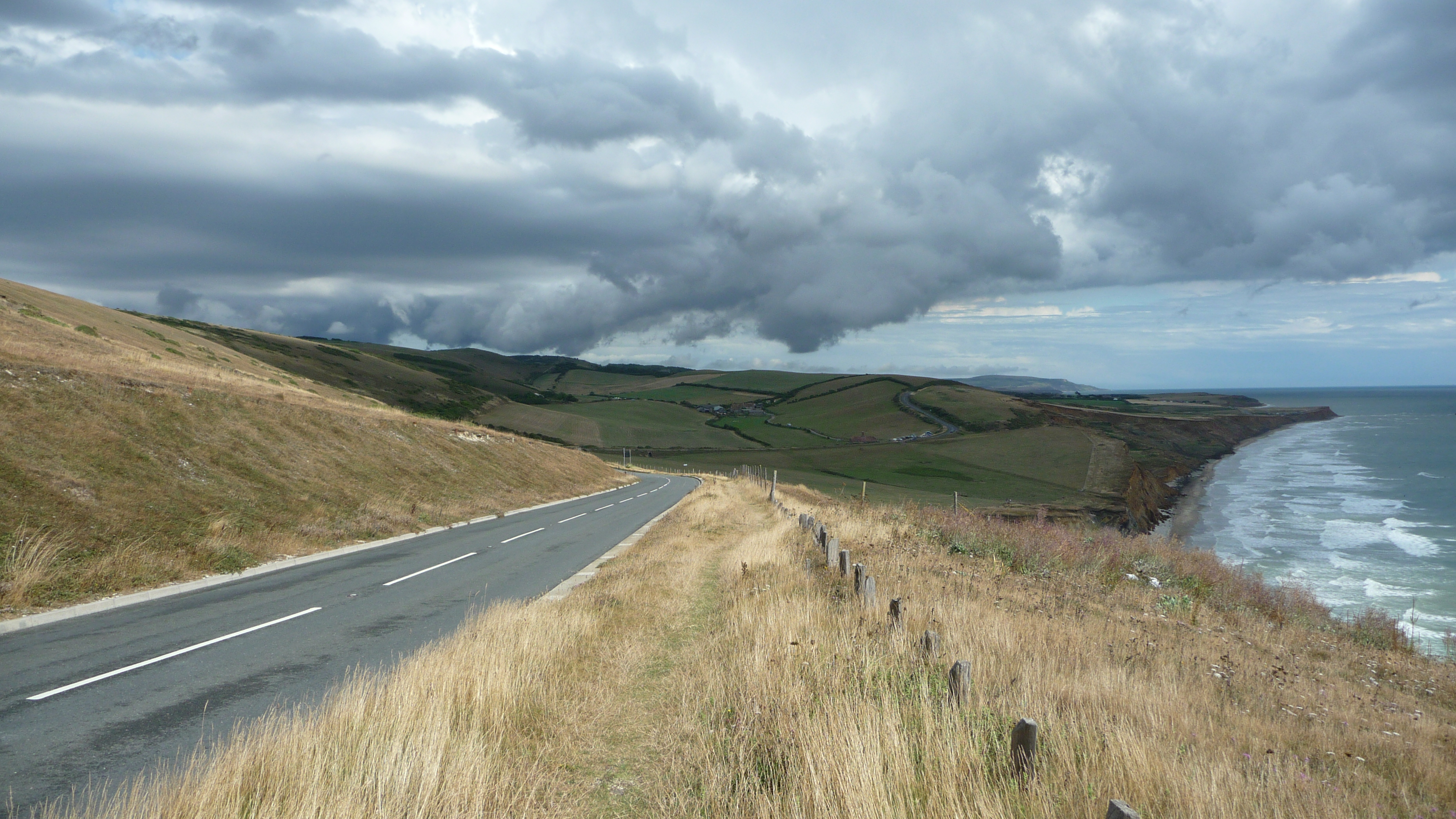
The film's opening sequence was shot on the Isle of Wight's Military Road (pictured in 2010).

Filming took place over a period of seven weeks at Ealing Studios and on location on the Isle of Wight between April and May 1999. The opening scene of Eddie racing back to the Guest House Paradiso on his motorbike was filmed on the Isle of Wight's Military Road. The hotel featured a Gothic-style structural design inspired by the neglected Parisian apartment complex in Jean-Pierre Jeunet's 1991 film Delicatessen.

Due to Mayall's accident, it was decided that Edmondson would handle directing duties. Edmondson was assured by Mayall's consultant that it was safe to physically hit him during filming, being told only a "traumatic blow [would] cause any damage". Despite this, Edmondson still sought to mitigate the amount of harm to which Mayall's character is subjected, including cutting a scene where Mayall falls down a staircase, saying "I thought it was stupid to risk it because every trick you do like that, you have to do at least part of it yourself. And you can't get away with not banging your head at all".

The kitchen fight scene between Richie and Eddie was estimated by Edmondson to have taken two-and-a-half days to film in its entirety. Mayall would reference it as one of his favourite moments from the film. For when Eddie is dragged back into the kitchen with meat hooks jammed in his nostrils by Richie, Mayall and Edmondson acted out the scene backward and Edmondson read his line "Excuse me one moment" in reverse, which when rewound played normally.

For the vomiting sequence towards the end of the film, Edmondson sought advice from Terry Jones on how to best incorporate it due to Jones's performance as Mr Creosote in Monty Python's 1983 film The Meaning of Life. Edmondson created the role of 'Vomit Technician' to help collect videotapes of different kinds of vomit for the film's special effects department to study when creating materials. He added "it was written a lot longer, and a lot larger. It was written with Titanic-like corridors of vomit, but it was a low-budget film. So we ended up doing a parody of the Harrison Ford film ... [i]t was actually a lot funnier". The sequence has been described by The New York Times as "one of the longest and most involved mass puking scenes ever committed to celluloid".

=== Music ===
The film's score was composed by jazz musician Colin Towns and has been described as "a rare breed of psycho lounge jazz". The soundtrack features brief interludes of dialogue from the film and utilises saxophones on select tracks, with pieces where the "tempo winds down as if disconnected from a power source" symptomatic of the "anarchic" stylistic choice Towns uses for the film. It featured Towns's Mask Orchestra band, which included the likes of Guy Barker, Alan Skidmore, and Peter King. The soundtrack was published through Towns's P.O.V. Records, being the debut release for the new label, and released in January 2000.

The film's closing credits features the song "Jazz Delicious Hot, Disgusting Cold" by the Bonzo Dog Doo-Dah Band, who Mayall and Edmondson were both fans of.

== Release ==
=== Box office ===
Universal Pictures distributed Guest House Paradiso under their Universal Pictures International subdivision, following their acquisition of PolyGram Filmed Entertainment, who produced the film. It grossed £1.5 million within the United Kingdom. Outside the UK, the film grossed £300,000/$500,000 abroad. £1 million was spent on marketing for the film. Produced on a budget of £3 million, the film failed to make back its money during its theatrical run.

=== Critical response ===
Ben Falk of Empire gave the film a 2 out of 5 star rating, saying "the boys toil incredibly hard to make the whole thing work and, while there are some hilarious moments, it is far too patchy for a full feature film". David Elley of Variety said the film "ends up being about as funny as burning an orphanage". Clayton Hickman of Film Review would give Guest House Paradiso one star, describing it as "entertainment of the crudest, most one-dimensional kind". In a similarly negative light, Peter Bradshaw of The Guardian wrote that the film was "naff, smug, cynical, ugly and charmless", and that, despite there being "early sight-gags and obscenities hammered out with enough chutzpah to raise a groaning laugh", the movie was a "gross-out Fawlty rip-off".

Time Out wrote that the "admittedly hilarious opening sight of Eddie speeding manically on his motorbike sets the tone: we're talking imbecilic bog humour, with stains; everything is pushed to the extreme. If your toes don't curl, that's because you've already left the cinema". Alternatively, Andy Medhurst of Sight and Sound wrote that "it's impossible not to have some sort of aghast admiration for this film's single-minded devotion to the lower portions of the human body", and, despite feeling the cast outside of Mayall and Edmondson were "go[ing] through the motions", said fans of the two "[weren't] likely to feel short changed".

In a retrospective analysis of the film in 2003, Wheeler Winston Dixon praised Guest House Paradiso claiming elements of the film "rivals anything offered up by the Three Stooges, Charlie Chaplin, or Harold Lloyd", and further praising Edmondson's "technical expertise" in his role as director. Edmondson, interviewed in 2026 for the documentary Rik Mayall: Magnificent B'Stard, reflected positively on his comedic partner's performance, saying he felt Mayall "was very funny in that film. I think he's as much like Peter Sellers as he's ever been. Really considered, really precise, good comedy".

=== Home media ===
Guest House Paradiso released on DVD in the United Kingdom in May 2000, and later in other countries, such as Japan, in November 2001. For its DVD release, it was prominently subtitled as Richie and Eddie's Bottom Movie. The film received a Blu-ray release via Vinegar Syndrome in August 2023, with its 35mm interpositive rescanned and restored. Included in the release were the outtakes and making-of featurette brought over from the original DVD release, and a new interview with Simon Pegg recounting his memories filming the movie.

== Cancelled sequel and aftermath ==
Mayall and Edmondson conceived of a follow-up to Guest House Paradiso in the form of another spin-off, elaborating on it during the publicity tour for the film. Edmondson clarified it would not function as a direct sequel to Guest House Paradiso but would feature the same Richie and Eddie characters "in some other situation". Expanding on the plot, Edmondson stated the potential spin-off was "set in space, in about 2050. You know those barges that carry shit out of the Thames and dump it in the Channel? Well, Earth’s become full by then, so we’re on a spaceship that drags it to the edge of the solar system and fires it off…And we’re cynically hoping to get a script ready quick so that if this does any kind of business, they might pay for another one". This proposed film failed to materialise, although elements of it were incorporated into Mayall and Edmondson's 2001 stage show Bottom Live 2001: An Arse Oddity.

In lieu of a sequel to Guest House Paradiso, Mayall and Edmondson continued to perform as the Richie and Eddie characters on stage in the aforementioned 2001 play, and in 2003's Bottom Live 2003: Weapons Grade Y-Fronts Tour, before Edmondson announced the end to their partnership in a 2004 interview with the Daily Mirror, saying they were "getting too old. We both realised that the show wasn't as engaging as it used to be. We were starting to look a bit ridiculous". A brief attempt at a revival was launched in 2012 to adapt their third stage show, 1997's Bottom Live 3: Hooligan's Island, with Mayall and Edmondson to return to their roles, however this would also be cancelled due to Edmondson pulling out of the project.

== See also ==
- Bottom — BBC2 sitcom which ran from 1991 to 1995.
- Filthy Rich & Catflap — BBC2 sitcom which ran for one series in 1987.
