= French and Saunders Still Alive =

- Comedy tour by French and Saunders
- Location: UK, Australia
- Start date: 28 February 2008
- End date: 29 July 2008

French and Saunders: Still Alive! is a 2008 tour by comedy duo Dawn French and Jennifer Saunders.

They performed in the UK in February – May in 2008 and were at Drury Lane, London for a month. The tour continued to Australia in mid-2009. There were many positive reviews for the UK leg of the tour, yet most reviews on the Australian leg were poor and negative. The first leg of the show concluded in May 2008. The show ended 9 November, in London. Previously they have toured their comedy act / sketch show very rarely, with UK tours in 1990 & 2000.

The tour contained a selection of their favourite sketches, as well as new material written specifically for the tour. The show was directed by Hamish McColl, set design by Lez Brotherstone, lighting, video and visual effects by Willie Williams.

== Sketch List ==
=== Act 1 ===
Video Introduction – Grannies Go to the Show

- The White Room
- The Doctor
- The Future
- Family
- Contraception
- Dawn's Chocolate Hunt

Video Interlude – Madonna

- White Room – Madonna

Video Interlude – Prickly Pear Farm

- In Court

Video Interlude – Those Lucky Bitches, Joan and Jackie Collins!

- Grannies (Born To Be Wild)
- Grannies Go To Dancing (Video Transition)
- Strictly Come Dancing

=== Act 2 ===
- Ab Fab
- Memories – Cassie Broadway

Video Interlude – What Ever Happened To Baby Dawn?

- Bideford Girls

Video Interlude – Jennifer Has A Marlene Day

- Boarding School

Video Interlude – Catherine Zeta-Jones

- Geraldine Visits
- So Called 'Goddess of Comedy'
- Thank You for the Music

Video Outro – French and Saunders Over The Years

=== Encore ===
- Fat Dick Men 3

== Tour dates ==
=== Leg 1: United Kingdom 2008 ===
•28 February – Blackpool
•1 March – Blackpool

•4 March – Manchester
•5 March – Manchester
•6 March – Manchester
•7 March – Manchester
•8 March – Manchester

•11 March – Sheffield

•12 March – Newcastle upon Tyne
•13 March – Newcastle upon Tyne

•14 March – Edinburgh
•15 March – Edinburgh

•18 March – Glasgow
•19 March – Glasgow

•20 March – Sunderland

•21 March – Aberdeen

•22 March – Newcastle upon Tyne

•25 March – Brighton
•26 March – Brighton

•27 March – Sheffield

•28 March – Ipswich
•29 March – Ipswich

•1 April – Plymouth
•2 April – Plymouth

•3 April – Nottingham
•4 April – Nottingham
•5 April – Nottingham

•7 April – Bournemouth

•9 April – Cardiff
•10 April – Cardiff
•11 April – Cardiff
•12 April – Cardiff

•14 April – Southampton
•15 April – Southampton

•16 April – Liverpool
•17 April – Liverpool

•18 April – Harrogate

•19 April – Llandeilo

•21 April – Birmingham
•22 April – Birmingham
•23 April – Birmingham
•24 April – Birmingham
•25 April – Birmingham
•26 April – Birmingham

•27 April – Bristol
•28 April – Bristol
•29 April – Bristol
•20 April – Bristol

•2 May – Portsmouth

•3 May – Bournemouth

•5 May – Oxford
•6 May – Oxford
•7 May – Oxford

=== Leg 2: Australia 2009 ===
•25 June – Newcastle
•26 June – Newcastle

•27 June – Canberra

•1 July – Sydney
•2 July – Sydney
•3 July – Sydney
•4 July – Sydney
•5 July – Sydney
•6 July – Sydney
•8 July – Sydney
•9 July – Sydney

•11 July – Brisbane
•12 July – Brisbane
•13 July – Brisbane

•15 July – Melbourne
•16 July – Melbourne
•17 July – Melbourne
•18 July – Melbourne
•19 July – Melbourne
•20 July – Melbourne

•23 July – Perth
•24 July – Perth
•25 July – Perth

•28 July – Adelaide
•29 July – Adelaide

=== Additional notes ===
•Two shows were performed on 4 July in Sydney.
•Two shows were performed on 12 July in Brisbane.
•Two shows were performed on 18 July in Melbourne, both shows at different venues.
•On 23 July in Perth, the show was performed at a different venue.
•Two shows were performed on 28 July in Adelaide, both shows at different venues.
