= Adrian Edmondson =

English actor, comedian, musician and writer (born 1957)

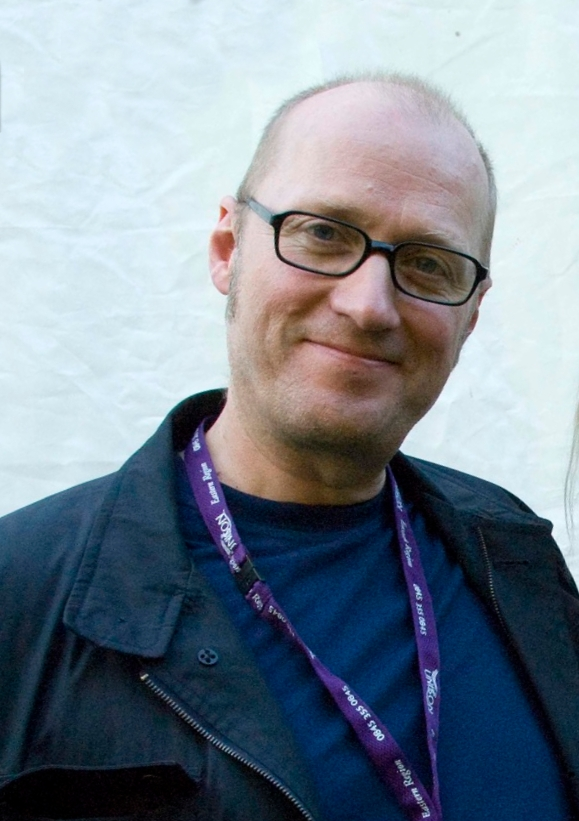
- Edmondson in 2008
- Born: Adrian Charles Edmondson; 24 January 1957 (age 69); Bradford, England
- Education: Pocklington School; University of Manchester
- Notable work: The Young Ones; The Comic Strip Presents...; Filthy Rich & Catflap; Bottom; Guest House Paradiso; The Dangerous Brothers; EastEnders; Holby City; A Spy Among Friends
- Spouse: Jennifer Saunders (m. 1985)
- Children: 3, including Ella and Beattie

Comedy career
- Years active: 1981–present
- Medium: Film; stand-up; television
- Genres: Black comedy; musical comedy; physical comedy

Adrian Charles Edmondson (born 24 January 1957) is an English actor, comedian, musician, writer and television presenter, who came to fame as part of the alternative comedy boom in the early 1980s. He and his comedy partner Rik Mayall starred in the television sitcoms The Young Ones (1982–1984), Filthy Rich & Catflap (1987) and Bottom (1991–1995), the last of which was written by Edmondson and Mayall, as well as the comedy feature film Guest House Paradiso (1999), which Edmondson directed and co-wrote. Edmondson and Mayall also appeared in The Comic Strip Presents... series of films throughout the 1980s and 1990s. For two episodes of this they created the spoof heavy metal band Bad News, and for another Edmondson played his nihilistic alter-ego Eddie Monsoon, an offensive South African television star.

He played the lead role in the Comic Strip's 1985 feature film The Supergrass. In the 2000s Edmondson appeared in Jonathan Creek, Holby City, Miss Austen Regrets, as himself on Hell's Kitchen, and created the sitcom Teenage Kicks. He performed and wrote for the Bonzo Dog Doo Dah Band (2006–2007). In 2008 he formed a folk punk band, the Bad Shepherds, singing and playing mandola and mandolin. In 2011 he presented The Dales and Ade in Britain, in which he undertook a tour of numerous places in Britain. In 2013, Edmondson was crowned the winner of Celebrity Masterchef. From 2019 to 2020 he appeared in EastEnders as Daniel Cook, and in 2022 he played Ebenezer Scrooge in the Royal Shakespeare Company's adaptation of A Christmas Carol.

== Early life ==
The second of four children, Adrian Charles Edmondson was born on 24 January 1957 in Bradford, West Riding of Yorkshire, to Dorothy Eileen Sturgeon (born 1930) and Fred Edmondson (1929–2014). As a child, Edmondson lived with his family in a variety of places including Cyprus, Bahrain, and Uganda, where his father was a teacher in the British Armed Forces. Edmondson attended Pocklington School, East Riding of Yorkshire, from 1968 to 1975, from age 11 to 18. In an interview with the Times Educational Supplement (TES), he stated that he did not enjoy his education at Pocklington, and that his group of friends considered the school's printed booklet of "endless" behavioural rules to be "a personal challenge to break". Edmondson calculated that during his time at Pocklington, he received a total of 66 strokes of the cane as well as frequent slipperings.

By the time he was in sixth form, with his parents were working abroad, Edmondson began to enjoy himself, "which involved lots of drinking and smoking and petty acts of vandalism." He made some good friends at the school and had a favourite teacher.

Edmondson went to the University of Manchester, to study drama, where he met his future comedy partner Rik Mayall, both graduating with a BA degree in 1978. Edmondson and Mayall became best friends, during this time, they also met fellow student Ben Elton, and soon became involved in the growing alternative comedy genre.

== Career ==
=== 1980s ===
Under the name 20th Century Coyote, Edmondson and Mayall became one of the star attractions at The Comedy Store, and joined other upcoming comedians, including Nigel Planer, Peter Richardson, Alexei Sayle, and French and Saunders at The Comic Strip club. The Comic Strip soon gained a reputation as one of the most popular comedy clubs in London and soon came to the attention of Channel 4. Edmondson and the others were commissioned to act in six self-contained half-hour films, using the group as comedy actors rather than stand-up performers. The series, titled The Comic Strip Presents... debuted on 2 November 1982 (the opening night of Channel 4). The first episode to be broadcast was "Five Go Mad in Dorset", a parody of Enid Blyton's Famous Five, and Edmondson starred as one of the five.

Following this, the BBC signed Edmondson, Mayall, Richardson, Planer, and Sayle to star in The Young Ones, a sitcom of similar anarchic style and violent slapstick as The Comic Strip. Edmondson and Mayall returned to their "Coyote" dynamic in the double act the Dangerous Brothers with Edmondson as "Sir Adrian Dangerous" in Saturday Live (1985–1987).

In 1985 Edmondson starred with his wife Jennifer Saunders in Happy Families, a rural comedy drama written by Ben Elton, which appeared on the BBC and told the story of the dysfunctional Fuddle family.

In 1987, Edmondson reunited with Planer and Mayall to star in Filthy Rich & Catflap, a comic attack on showbiz, again written by Elton. He played "Edward Catflap", a coarse, drunken minder of light-entertainment nonentity "Richie Rich". In this show Edmondson displayed the same slapstick characteristics as Vyvyan in The Young Ones but was closer in personality to his later character "Eddie Hitler" in Bottom. The show was cancelled after one series. Edmondson was also slated to make a guest appearance along Mayall in the fifth episode of the ITV sitcom Hardwicke House. Due to the adverse reaction of both press and viewers, however, ITV withdrew the series after showing only two episodes and the remaining episodes – including Edmondson's scheduled guest appearance in episode 5 – have never been shown.

In 1988, Edmondson released a follow-up to How To Be A Complete Bastard called The Bastard's Book of the Worst. In 1989 he made an appearance as the Red Baron, nemesis to Mayall's character, Lord Flashheart, in an episode of Blackadder Goes Forth.

=== 1990s ===
Edmondson played Brad Majors in the 1990 West End run of The Rocky Horror Show, alongside Tim McInnerny as Frank-N-Furter and Ed Tudor-Pole as Riff-Raff. He also appears on the soundtrack album of the production. In 1991, he teamed with his comedy partner Rik Mayall once more, this time co-writing and co-starring in their own sitcom, Bottom. Edmondson starred as "Edward Elizabeth Hitler" opposite Mayall's "Richard Richard". The series featured the slapstick, crude humour for which the pair had become famous but with more in-depth character analysis.

Edmondson played Estragon to Mayall's Vladimir in Samuel Beckett's play Waiting for Godot in the West End, in a production that opened at the Queen's Theatre on 30 September 1991. Bottom became very popular, but it was criticised for its often vulgar humour. The show was also turned into five UK stage tours (1993, 1995, 1997, 2001 and 2003).

In 1993, Edmondson starred alongside Richard Briers in a black comedy called If You See God, Tell Him, where Edmondson played Gordon Spry, whose uncle (Briers) is paralysed and has a greatly reduced attention span, and his erratic behaviour causes problems.

In September 1995, Edmondson released his first (comic) novel, The Gobbler. In 1996, he played the role of Ace Face/Bellboy at the Who's performance of Quadrophenia at London's Hyde Park. A video game called Animal, featuring Peperami's "the animal", was released the same year, with the character being voiced by Edmondson. From 1997 to 1998, he voiced engine stoker "Limbs" Jones, a major character in the animated series Captain Star.

In the 1998 ITV pantomime Jack and the Beanstalk, Edmondson played Jack's mother Dame Dolly alongside Griff Rhys Jones, Neil Morrissey, Denise Van Outen, Paul Merton, Julian Clary and Julie Walters.

=== 2000s ===
Edmondson appeared regularly as Brendan Baxter in Series 4 of the BBC mystery series Jonathan Creek, broadcast in 2003–2004. He had a lead role playing an NHS doctor in the comedy series Doctors and Nurses first broadcast in early 2004. In Surviving Disaster, a BBC docudrama about the 1986 Chernobyl disaster, broadcast at the start of 2006, Edmondson played the role of Valery Legasov. In 2005 he appeared as a celebrity model on Star Portraits with Rolf Harris. That year, he also competed on "Comic Relief Does Fame Academy" where he made it to the finale and came in 3rd place. From 2005 to 2008 he appeared as Percy "Abra" Durant in the medical drama Holby City. In 2008 he played Henry Austen in the BBC produced film Miss Austen Regrets, and Vernon in the ITV sitcom Teenage Kicks. In April 2009, he reached the final, coming second to Linda Evans in the cooking show Hell's Kitchen.

Edmondson played the role of Captain Hook in the Canterbury Marlowe Arena pantomime during its Christmas 2009 run.

=== 2010s ===
In an August 2010 edition of Radio 4's Chain Reaction programme he said to Lee Mack that he had not really quit but was focusing more on music and farming. He also said that he and Mayall often spoke of a reunion when they are old men, or in fifteen years' time. Mayall appeared during Edmondson's winning performance of The Dying Swan on BBC One's Let's Dance for Comic Relief on 5 March 2011, and in September 2011, Edmondson appeared on the Sunday morning cooking show Something for the Weekend and told presenter Tim Lovejoy that he and Rik Mayall were planning to reunite and make another series of Bottom, set in an old people's home.

In 2011, Edmondson hosted the ITV documentary series The Dales, in which he followed a number of families who live and work in the Yorkshire Dales, including the "Yorkshire Shepherdess" Amanda Owen. He also presented the ITV series Ade in Britain that year, where he travelled to different parts of the United Kingdom in a Mini Countryman towing a small caravan, often including a performed segment from local folk singers. A second series followed in 2013.

Edmondson appeared on the BBC One series That's Britain! 2011. In each episode, his task was to report as an "insider" in how a region of Britain works. A one-off special, Britain Beware, about the history of British public information films, was hosted by Edmondson in 2012.

In August 2012, the BBC announced plans for a 2013 television adaptation of Edmondson and Mayall's 1997 Hooligan's Island tour, but Edmondson announced later that year that he had pulled out of the project to pursue other interests. Rik Mayall, Edmondson's long-time creative partner, died on 9 June 2014.

Edmondson had a minor role in the 2012 film Blood. Edmondson and Saunders reunited with their former Comic Strip colleagues in 2012 for a Gold Famous Five sequel, Five Go to Rehab.

Edmondson won the 2013 BBC One cookery series of Celebrity MasterChef. In 2014, Edmondson presented Ade at Sea, a factual six-part programme for the ITV network. In 2014, he played DCI Warner in the three-part mini-series Prey.

He played the role of Gordon in the 2013 Chichester Festival Theatre production of Neville's Island. In 2014, he reprised the role for the show's West End run. In 2015, Edmondson voiced Stanley the Dachshund in adverts for health and life insurance company Vitality.

In 2016, Edmondson took part in episode 4 of The Great Sport Relief Bake Off and won the title of Star Baker. Edmondson starred in an adaptation of William Leith's bestseller Bits Of Me Are Falling Apart at the Soho Theatre, London.

In 2016, Edmondson starred as Count Ilya Rostov in the bbc adaptation of War and Peace.

Edmondson's children's book Tilly and the Time Machine was published on 4 May 2017. From November 2017 into 2018, Edmondson played the character of Malvolio in the Royal Shakespeare Company's production of Shakespeare's Twelfth Night. Also in 2017, Edmondson appeared as Captain Peavey in the eighth film of the Star Wars series, The Last Jedi, a casting decision made by the film's director Rian Johnson, a self-proclaimed fan of Edmondson's work in The Young Ones and Bottom.

In August 2018, Edmondson voiced the character of Bunny in the English version of the French/Belgian animated film The Big Bad Fox and Other Tales.... In September 2018, Edmondson featured as Sergeant Dogberry in the episode "Sigh No More" of Ben Elton's Upstart Crow. From September 2018 to November 2018, Edmondson toured with Nigel Planer in a play that they wrote together called Vulcan 7 (restaged in 2023 as It's Headed Straight Towards Us). In 2019, Edmondson appeared in EastEnders as Daniel Cook.

=== 2020s ===
He has appeared on BBC Radio 4 comedy show, I'm Sorry I Haven't a Clue.

=== Music career ===
In 1984, Edmondson formed the spoof heavy metal band Bad News, as part of The Comic Strip Presents... series with Comic Strip regulars Rik Mayall, Nigel Planer and Peter Richardson. The band proved popular, and they released two singles (neither of which reached the top 40) and two studio albums. They also played a series of small gigs around the country, culminating in their performance at the Monsters of Rock festival in 1986.

In 1986, Edmondson achieved a number one hit in the UK singles chart when he and his co-stars from The Young Ones teamed up with Cliff Richard to record a new version of "Living Doll" for the inaugural Comic Relief campaign. Despite having been killed off in the final episode of the series, Edmondson played Vyvyan one last time in the video. The same year he co-wrote the book How to be a Complete Bastard together with Mark Leigh and Mike Lepine.

Edmondson has directed pop videos for "Fiesta" (1988) by the Pogues, "Prime Mover" (1987) by Zodiac Mindwarp, "Like the Weather" (1988) by 10,000 Maniacs, "Please Help the Cause Against Loneliness" (1988) by Sandie Shaw and "Hourglass" by Squeeze (1987). The latter won Best Video at the MTV awards. He also directed "Black Sheep Wall" (1989) by The Innocence Mission, "This Town" (1989) by Elvis Costello and "When I Grow Up" (1989) by Michelle Shocked.

He also directed and appeared in "International Rescue" (1989) by Fuzzbox and appeared in the music video "Terry" (1983) by Kirsty MacColl.

In 1991, Edmondson formed the Bum Notes, who were a jazz instrumental band and conceived exclusively to perform theme music for Bottom.

A fan of the Bonzo Dog Doo Dah Band, Edmondson performed vocals with them as part of their 2006 reformation and countrywide tour. He also contributed vocals and writing for their 2007 album Pour l'Amour des Chiens.

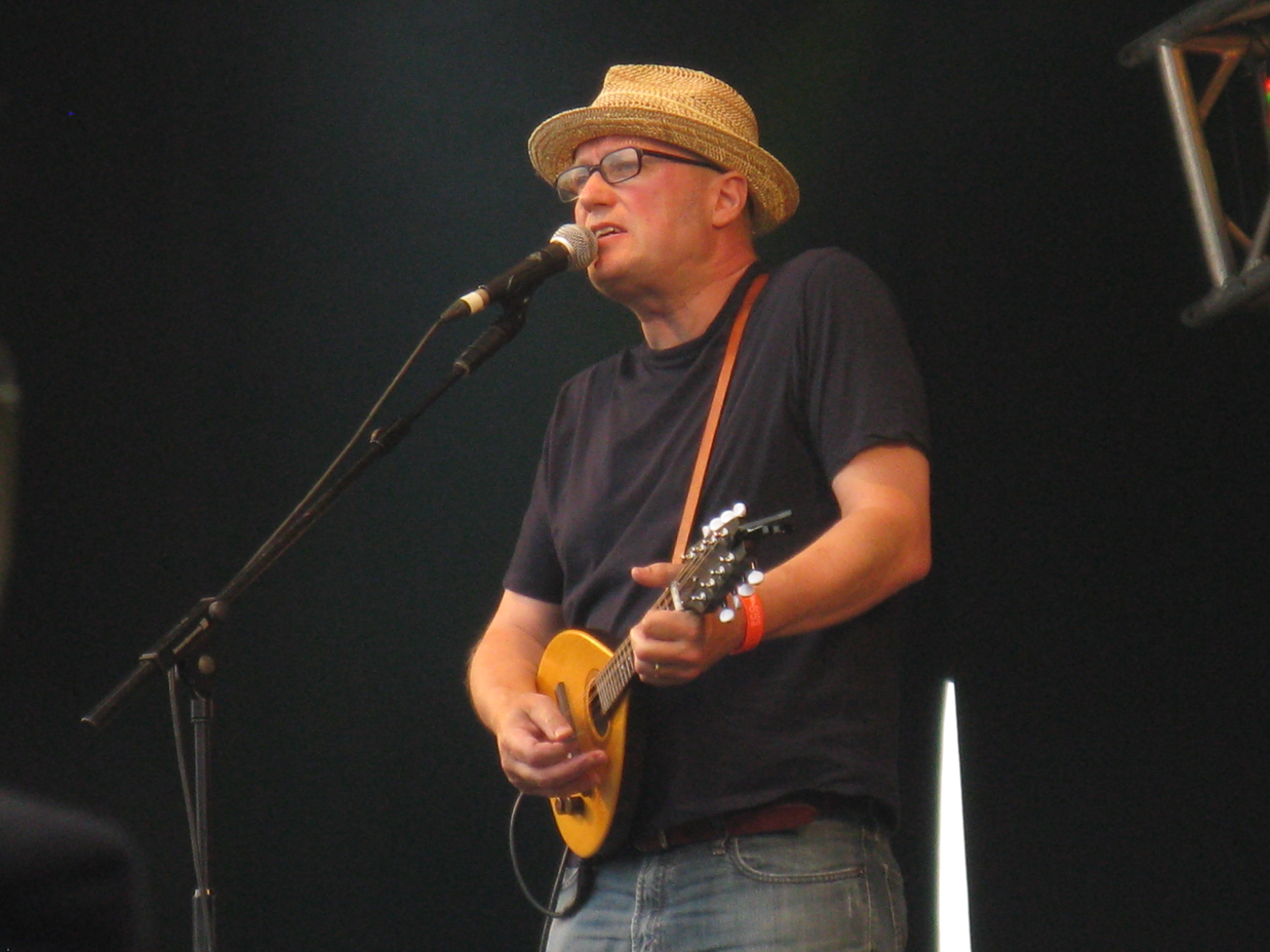
Edmondson with the Bad Shepherds at the 2009 Cropredy Festival in Oxfordshire

Together with Maartin Allcock, Andy Dinan and Troy Donockley, Edmondson founded the band the Bad Shepherds in 2008, performing punk and new wave classics on traditional folk instruments. The band released three albums and first toured in 2009, playing at places such as the Trowbridge Village Pump Festival. The Bad Shepherds also headlined the first ever Looe Music Festival in 2011. They disbanded in October 2016.

In 2010, he founded the Idiot Bastard Band with Simon Brint, Rowland Rivron, Neil Innes and Phill Jupitus. The Idiot Bastard Band perform original comedy songs as well as cover versions, and their shows often feature guest performers. The group continued to perform following the death of Brint in 2011.

== Personal life ==
Edmondson married comedian Jennifer Saunders on 11 May 1985. They have three daughters, including musician Ella and actress Beattie. He is a supporter of Exeter City F.C.

Edmondson's autobiography, Berserker!: An Autobiography, was published by Pan Macmillan in September 2023.

In September 2023 Edmondson was the guest for BBC Radio 4's Desert Island Discs. An extended version was broadcast in September 2024. His choices included "Downtown" by Petula Clark and "Sugar, Sugar" by The Archies. His favourite song was "Wide Open Spaces" by The Dixie Chicks, his book choice was Waiting for Godot by Samuel Beckett, and his luxury item was a tab of acid.

== Filmography ==
=== Film ===
Year	Title	Role	Notes
1981	Fundamental Frolics	Himself	Charity comedy and music show for Mencap
1983	Dead on Time!	Fool	Short film
1985	The Supergrass	Dennis Carter	
1986	The Dangerous Brothers Present: World of Danger	Sir Adrian Dangerous	All sketches from Saturday Live and un-aired compiled on VHS/DVD
1987	Eat the Rich	Charles	
1987	Mr. Jolly Lives Next Door	Dreamytime Escort proprietor	Feature film from The Comic Strip presents... series.
1991	The Pope Must Die	Father Rookie	
1993	Bottom Live	Edward 'Eddie' Hitler	Live recording of Bottom stageplay filmed at the Mayflower Theatre
1995	Bottom Live: The Big Number Two Tour	Edward 'Eddie' Hitler	Live recording of Bottom 2 stageplay. Also writer and executive producer
1997	Bottom Live 3: Hooligan's Island	Edward 'Eddie' Hitler	Live recording of Bottom 3 stageplay. Also writer and executive producer
1999	Guest House Paradiso	Eddie Elizabeth Ndingombaba	Also writer and director
2001	Bottom 2001: An Arse Oddity	Edward 'Eddie' Hitler	Live recording of Bottom 4 stageplay. Also writer
2003	Bottom Live 2003: Weapons Grade Y-Fronts Tour	Edward 'Eddie' Hitler	Live recording of Bottom 5 stageplay. Also writer
2006	Terkel in Trouble	Terkel (voice)	English dub
2012	Blood	Tom Tiernan	
2017	The Rizen	Interviewer	
2017	Interlude in Prague	Herr Lubtak	
2017	The Big Bad Fox and Other Tales...	Bunny (voice)	English dub
2017	Star Wars: The Last Jedi	Captain Peavey	
2018	The War of the Worlds: The Musical Drama	Ogilvy	
2019	The Rizen: Possession	Interviewer	
2021	Best Birthday Ever	Granny (voice)	
2026	Rogue Trooper	TBA	
TBA	&Sons	John Payle	Short film; Post-production

=== Television ===
Year	Title	Role	Notes
1981	Friday Night, Saturday Morning	20th Century Coyote	Series 4; Episodes 1 and 6
1981	Oxford Road Show	20th Century Coyote	Series 2; Episode 1
1981	The Comic Strip	Adrian Dangerous	Television film. Bonus feature on The Comic Strip Presents... DVD
1982	Kevin Turvey: The Man Behind the Green Door	Keith Marshall	Television films
1982	The Magnificent One	Larry	Television films
1982–1984	The Young Ones	Vyvyan Basterd / Alien Spotter / Randy the Cowpoke	Series 1 and 2; 12 episodes
1982–2012	The Comic Strip Presents...	Various roles	Series 1–9; 30 episodes. Also writer (6 episodes), director (2 episodes)
1984	Spitting Image	Harold Angryperson (voice)	Series 1; Episode 7
1984	The Lenny Henry Show	Various characters	Series 1; Episode 4
1985	Happy Families	Guy Fuddle	Episodes 1–6
1985	Saturday Live	20th Century Coyote	Pilot episode
1986	Saturday Live	Sir Adrian Dangerous	8 episodes including sketches featuring The Dangerous Brothers
1986	Screen Two	Alun Pickersgill	Episode 5: "Honest, Decent and True"
1987	Filthy Rich & Catflap	Edward Catflap	Episodes 1–6
1987	Hardwicke House	Tiny	Episode: "The Old Boys".
1988	French and Saunders	John	Episode: "Potholing"
1989	Press Gang	Simon Knowles	Episode: "One Easy Lesson"
1989	A Night of Comic Relief 2	Vyvyan	Television special for Comic Relief
1989	Blackadder Goes Forth	Baron von Richthofen	Episode: "Private Plane"
1989	Snakes and Ladders	Giles	
1989	Hysteria 2!	Himself	Standup special for The Terrence Higgins Trust
1989	The Secret Policeman's Biggest Ball	Himself	Standup special for Amnesty International
1990	Screen One	Phil Burke	Episode: "News Hounds"
1991	Comic Relief	Vim Fuego	Red Nose Day television special
1991–1995	Bottom	Edward 'Eddie' Hitler	Series 1–3; 18 episodes. Also co-creator and writer with Rik Mayall.
1992, 1994	Absolutely Fabulous	Hamish	2 episodes
1993	Jackanory	Storyteller	Story: "Harvey Angell: Parts 1–5"
1993	If You See God, Tell Him	Gordon Spry	Mini-series
1994	Anna Lee	Dominic Jones	Episode 4: "The Cook's Tale"
1994	French and Saunders	Tim Goodchance	Episode: "French and Saunders' Christmas Carol"
1995	The Adventures of Young Indiana Jones: Treasure of the Peacock's Eye	Zyke	Television film
1995	Look at the State We're In!	Dewhurst	Mini-series; Episodes 1–5
1997–1998	Captain Star	'Limbs' Jones (voice)	13 episodes
1998	French and Saunders	James Macaroon	Episode: "The Making of the Filming of the Making of Titanic"
1998	Jack and the Beanstalk	Dame Dolly	Television films
1999	The Man	Alex	Television films
2003–2004	Jonathan Creek	Brendan Baxter	Series 4; Episodes 1–5
2004	Doctors and Nurses	Dr. Roy Glover	Episodes 1–6
2005	Twisted Tales	Ed Barnes	Episode 10: "Cursed House"
2005	Comic Relief Does Fame Academy	Himself – Competitor	Series 2; Finished in 3rd Place.
2005–2008	Holby City	Percy 'Abra' Durant	Series 7–11; 45 episodes
2006	Surviving Disaster	Valery Legasov	Docudrama mini-series; Episode 3: "Chernobyl Nuclear Disaster"
2007	Miss Austen Regrets	Henry Austen	Television film
2007	A Bucket o' French & Saunders	Hamish	Compilation specials; Episode 4
2007	Top Gear	Himself – Performer	Series 9; Episode 7: "Top Gear of the Pops". Part of Red Nose Day 2007
2008	Teenage Kicks	Vernon	Episodes 1–8. Also writer
2008	Celebrity Mastermind	Himself – Contestant	Series 6; Episode 2; Finished in 3rd Place
2009	Hell's Kitchen	Himself – Contestant	Series 4; Episodes 1–15; Finished in 2nd Place
2010	Pete & Dud: The Lost Sketches	Performer	Television film
2011–2013	Ade in Britain	Himself – Presenter	Series 1 and 2; 50 episodes
2011–2013	The Dales	Himself – Presenter	Series 1–3; 36 episodes. Edmondson explores the Yorkshire Dales, getting to know the area and meeting the residents.
2012	The Bleak Old Shop of Stuff	Headmaster Wackville	Episodes 1 and 2
2013	Celebrity MasterChef	Himself – Contestant	Series 8; Winner
2014	Ade at Sea	Himself – Presenter	Episodes 1–6
2014	Prey	ACC Warner	Series 1; Episodes 1–3
2014	Celebrity Fifteen to One	Himself – Contestant	Series 1; Episode 3
2014–2015	Ronja, the Robber's Daughter	Noodle Pete (voice)	English version; 23 episodes
2016	War & Peace	Count Ilya Rostov	Mini-series; Episodes 1–6
2016	One of Us	Peter Elliot	Mini-series; Episodes 1–4
2017	Genius	David Hilbert	Season 1; Episode 7: "Einstein: Chapter Seven"
2017, 2020	Bancroft	Supt. Cliff Walker	Recurring role. Series 1 and 2; 7 episodes
2018	Urban Myths	Leslie Conn	Series 2; Episode: "David Bowie and Marc Bolan"
2018	Upstart Crow	Sergeant Dogberry	Series 3; Episode 4: "Sigh No More"
2018–2020	Save Me	Gideon Charles	Recurring role. Series 1 and 2; 4 episodes
2019	Strike Back: Revolution	James McKitterick, British High Commissioner to Malaysia	Season 7; Episodes 1 and 2
2019	Cheat	William Vaughn	Main role; Episodes 1–4
2019	Summer of Rockets	Max Dennis	Mini-series; Episodes 5 and 6
2019–2020	EastEnders	Daniel Cook	Series regular; 38 episodes
2019, 2022	Richard Osman's House of Games	Himself – Contestant	Series 3; Week 1, and Series 5; Week 9 (House of Champions)
2020	Death in Paradise	Charles Crabtree	Series 9; Episode 1: "La Murder Le Diablé"
2020	Out of Her Mind	Lewis	Episodes 4–6
2020	Celebrity Mastermind	Himself – Contestant	Series 18; Episode 7; Winner
2021	The Pact	Richard Clarke	Series regular. Series 1; Episodes 1–5
2021	Midsomer Murders	Hugo Welles	Series 22; Episode 3: "Happy Families"
2021	Back to Life	John Boback	Season 2; Episodes 1–5
2021	The Trick	Edward Acton	Television film
2022	A Spy Among Friends	Sir Roger Hollis	Mini-series; Episodes 1–6
2023	Rain Dogs	Lenny	5 episodes
2023–2024	Toad & Friends	Toad (voice role)	Animated series
2024	3 Body Problem	Denys Porlock	Series 1; 3 episodes
2024	Kidnapped: The Chloe Ayling Story	Phil Green	4 episodes
2025	Alien: Earth	Atom Eins	7 episodes
2025	Beyond Paradise	David Haleton	Christmas Special 2025
2026	Sam and Ade Go Birding	Himself – Co-presenter	Three-part wildlife series with Sam West
2026	Bergerac	Nigel	Series 2; Episodes 1–6

=== Video games ===
Year	Title	Role	Notes
1987	How to Be a Complete Bastard	Himself (likeness)	
1996	Animal	Peperami (voice)	
2022	Lego Star Wars: The Skywalker Saga	Captain Peevey (voice)	

=== Theatre ===
Year	Title	Role	Venue
1990	The Rocky Horror Show	Brad Majors	Piccadilly Theatre, London
1991	Waiting for Godot	Estragon	Queen's Theatre, London
2006	The Rocky Horror Tribute Show Concert	Brad Majors (shared)	Royal Court Theatre, London
2013	Neville's Island	Gordon	Theatre in the Park, Chichester
2014	Neville's Island	Gordon	Duke of York's Theatre, London
2015	Rocky Horror Show Live	Second Narrator	Playhouse Theatre, London
2016	Bits of Me Are Falling Apart	Performer and co-adaptor	Soho Theatre, London
2017	Twelfth Night	Malvolio	Royal Shakespeare Theatre, Stratford-upon-Avon
2018	Vulcan 7	Gary Savage and co-writer	UK tour
2019	The Boy Friend	Lord Brockhurst	Menier Chocolate Factory, London
2021	Once Upon a Time in Nazi Occupied Tunisia	Grandma	Almeida Theatre, London
2022	A Christmas Carol	Ebenezer Scrooge	Royal Shakespeare Theatre, Stratford-upon-Avon

=== Narration ===
Year	Title	Notes
1995	Stark	Audiobook reading of the Ben Elton book
1995	The Cat in the Hat	Audiobook reading of the Dr. Seuss book The Cat in the Hat
1995	Green Eggs and Ham	Audiobook reading of the Dr. Seuss book Green Eggs and Ham
1995	Fox in Socks	Audiobook reading of the Dr. Seuss book Fox in Socks
1995	The Gobbler	Audiobook of Edmondson reading his book of the same name
1996	The Cat in the Hat and Other Stories	Audiobook of Edmondson reading Dr. Seuss' stories (Re-released 2007)
2005	Pirates	Audiobook

== Books ==
Year	Title	Publisher	ISBN
1986	How to be a Complete Bastard	Virgin Books	ISBN 978-0863691829
1988	The Complete Bastard's Book of the Worst	Virgin Books	ISBN 978-0863692826
1995	The Gobbler	William Heinemann	ISBN 978-0434001491
2017	Tilly and the Time Machine	Puffin Books	ISBN 978-0141372457
2018	Junkyard Jack and the Horse That Talked	Puffin Books	ISBN 978-0141372495
2023	Berserker!	Macmillan	ISBN 978-1035014279

== Discography ==
Albums

Year	Title	Band	Notes
1987	Bad News	Bad News	Album by The Comic Strip's spin-off band (Re-released 1989 and 2004)
1988	Bootleg	Bad News	Second album by Bad News
1991	Cash in Compilation	Bad News	Compilation album of randomly picked tracks
2007	Pour l'Amour des Chiens	Bonzo Dog Doo-Dah Band	Vocals and writing
2009	Yan, Tyan, Tethera, Methera	The Bad Shepherds	debut album by the Bad Shepherds
2010	By Hook or By Crook	The Bad Shepherds	Second album by the Bad Shepherds
2013	Mud, Blood & Beer	The Bad Shepherds	Third album by the Bad Shepherds

Non-album songs

Year	Title	Artist	Notes
1986	"Living Doll"	Cliff Richard with the Young Ones	In character as Vyvyan from The Young Ones
1991	"Last Night"	The Bum Notes	Cover of the Mar-Keys track, used in the credits for Bottom
1992	"This Wheel's on Fire"	Julie Driscoll and Ade Edmondson	As the theme song for sitcom Absolutely Fabulous
