= Happy Families (1985 TV series) =

- Genre: Comedy
- Starring: Jennifer Saunders; Adrian Edmondson; Dawn French; Stephen Fry
- Country of origin: United Kingdom
- Original language: English
- No. of series: 1
- No. of episodes: 6

Production
- Running time: 35 minutes

Original release
- Network: BBC One
- Release: 17 October – 21 November 1985

Happy Families is a BBC rural comedy drama television series written by Ben Elton first broadcast in 1985. It recounts the tale of the dysfunctional Fuddle family. It stars Jennifer Saunders as Granny Fuddle, Dawn French as the Cook and Adrian Edmondson as her imbecilic grandson Guy.

== Premise ==
The series centres on Guy's attempts to find his four sisters – also played by Saunders – for a family reunion.

== Cast ==
=== Main ===
- Jennifer Saunders as Granny, Cassie, Madeleine, Joyce and Roxanne Fuddle
- Adrian Edmondson as Guy Fuddle, Grandpa Harold Fuddle
- Dawn French as Cook
- Stephen Fry as Dr. De Quincy
- Helen Lederer as Flossie

=== Supporting ===
- Jim Broadbent as Dalcroix
- Hugh Laurie as Jim
- Una Stubbs as Mother Superior
- Christine Edmunds as Maxine
- Ceri Jackson as Sister Ophelia
- Claudette Williams as Jill
- Rik Mayall as Nazi pastor
- Chris Barrie as Sammy

== Production and visual style ==
Each sister's story was shot in a different "style" of film; Cassie's story was shot to make it appear to be a U.S. soap opera, Madelaine's story was shot in soft focus to make it appear to be a French film, Roxanne's story was filmed as though appearing in a gritty BBC documentary, and Joyce's story was filmed like an Ealing comedy.

== Episodes ==
=== Introduction (a.k.a. Edith) ===
The first episode focuses on Edith Fuddle (Saunders), who is told by her doctor De Quincy (Stephen Fry), that she has Corrington's disease, and will die within nine months. Throughout the series de Quincy shows himself to be tactless, forgetful and almost negligent – he constantly forgets to inform Cook that she is pregnant, and at one stage injects himself with a dose of morphine intended for Edith. Although in a bitter feud with her grandson (Ade Edmondson), she enlists his help to go out into the world to find his four sisters, and to bring them back to her for a family reunion before she dies.

=== Cassie ===
The second eldest, Cassie, has become a huge star in Hollywood under the name Cassie Epris-Curtis. Pampered by everyone who surrounds her, Cassie has cut off all ties with her British heritage. Although, as Guy arrives, Cassie is revealed to be a stressed, spoiled actress who throws tantrums over tiny flaws, and after ruining a scene of the show where she has gained her fame, she is fired, and reluctantly takes up Guy's offer to return to her grandmother.

=== Madeleine ===
In the third episode, the life of Madeleine, the second youngest granddaughter is revealed. Now living in the house of a renowned poet, Dalcroix (Jim Broadbent). Naive, and now with a French accent, Madeleine is loyal to her adopted housefather, unaware that he is a peeping tom. Guy arrives to the town where Dalcroix resides, and finds that the town (made up of Nazis) hates Dalcroix, and all that he stands for. Their anger finally bubbles over, after a postcard featuring Madeleine in a suggestive pose finds Guy, and led by their local priest (Rik Mayall) the town revolts and burns Dalcroix at the stake. Now, without purpose, Madeleine agrees with Guy's proposals to return to her childhood home.

=== Joyce ===
Episode 4 sees the life of Joyce, the eldest, who is now a Catholic nun, after a miracle featuring the Madonna Mary, a tree and a conker. Joyce, who has been a novice for 19 years, is regularly punished by the sadistic Sister Prudence. Although she fancies herself as a jolly, upbeat joker, everyone who encounters Joyce finds her irritating and thick. However, Joyce proves to be a brilliant sleuth (unintentionally) and foils the Mother Superior's (Una Stubbs) plan to take over England, and reinstate the Catholic Monarchy, with the help of Guy, who fools Joyce into leaving the nunnery and return home, disguised as the angel Gabriel. Joyce announces her plans to vacate the convent to all the other nuns, much to their delight.

=== Roxanne ===
The penultimate episode focuses on the youngest sister, Roxanne, who at 20 years old, is now in HMP Long Mangley serving 50 years for contributory negligence. Obsessed with the documentary On the Mangle, which focuses on the inmates of Long Mangley, Guy hatches a plan to spring Roxanne by using a giant chocolate box, which, surprisingly, works, although all the prisoners are released for a "stroll". An emotional Guy and a bewildered Roxanne are finally able to go home.

=== Reunion ===
The final episode reunites all of the family together back in Fuddlewich—the four granddaughters return by various means of transport to their childhood home, and they all encounter one sister, although none of them recognises the other.

Joyce returns by train, and has a brief meeting with Madeleine, and they both leave the train station, neither recognising the other. Cassie has caught a cab from America, which is breaking down by the time it nears Fuddlewich. Roxanne, who has walked from her prison, is stopped by Cassie who notes that it is a coincidence that they both have double syllable Christian names (despite Roxanne stating that her name is Fuddle, the same as Cassie).

The granddaughters return to the home of their grandparents, and are placed in the dining room, and starved until Edith is ready to see them. They are then brought into the billiard room, where they all conference, and Edith tells them why she has brought them back together. Edith reveals that she has not brought them back out of love (as Guy first thought), she hates them all deeply. She reveals that Harold (her husband, who died nine months before), was a pervert and "loved" his granddaughters deeply. Not wanting to lose her husband, Edith called social services and reported the incident, which allowed Edith to get rid of the girls. She also reveals the fate of their mother, who died destitute in a ditch of a broken-heart, after being hit by a car (presumably driven by Edith).

Edith was left with her husband and Guy, who was hated even as a child. She also tells the girls that on the same day that Guy began his search, she had been told that she was suffering from Corrington's Disease, which kills the victim in nine months. She reveals this as the reason she has brought the girls back. She tells her granddaughters, that the only cure is to get one organ from four donors of the same bloodline and gender, and offers to give them all one quarter of her entire estate, in order to get her vital operation. All of them agree, however just as the operation is about to begin, Flossy the maid barges in to tell them that Cook has died after turning blue (a symptom of Corringtons). Doctor De Quincy comes to the conclusion that he must have mixed up the urine samples, and that Edith must be pregnant (at nearly 80 years of age). Edith suddenly goes into labour, and shortly afterwards gives birth to a baby boy. Still bitter and resentful, she dismisses the girls to return to their pathetic existence. Cassie, however, challenges her, saying they still have the documents and want their inheritance now. Edith reluctantly agrees and also offers to give them her newborn as well. None of the girls want him but offer their grandmother a £50 per week allowance for the sake of their newborn uncle. The episode ends with Edith left in an empty house with Guy who is to be wed to Flossy.
