= Ella Edmondson =

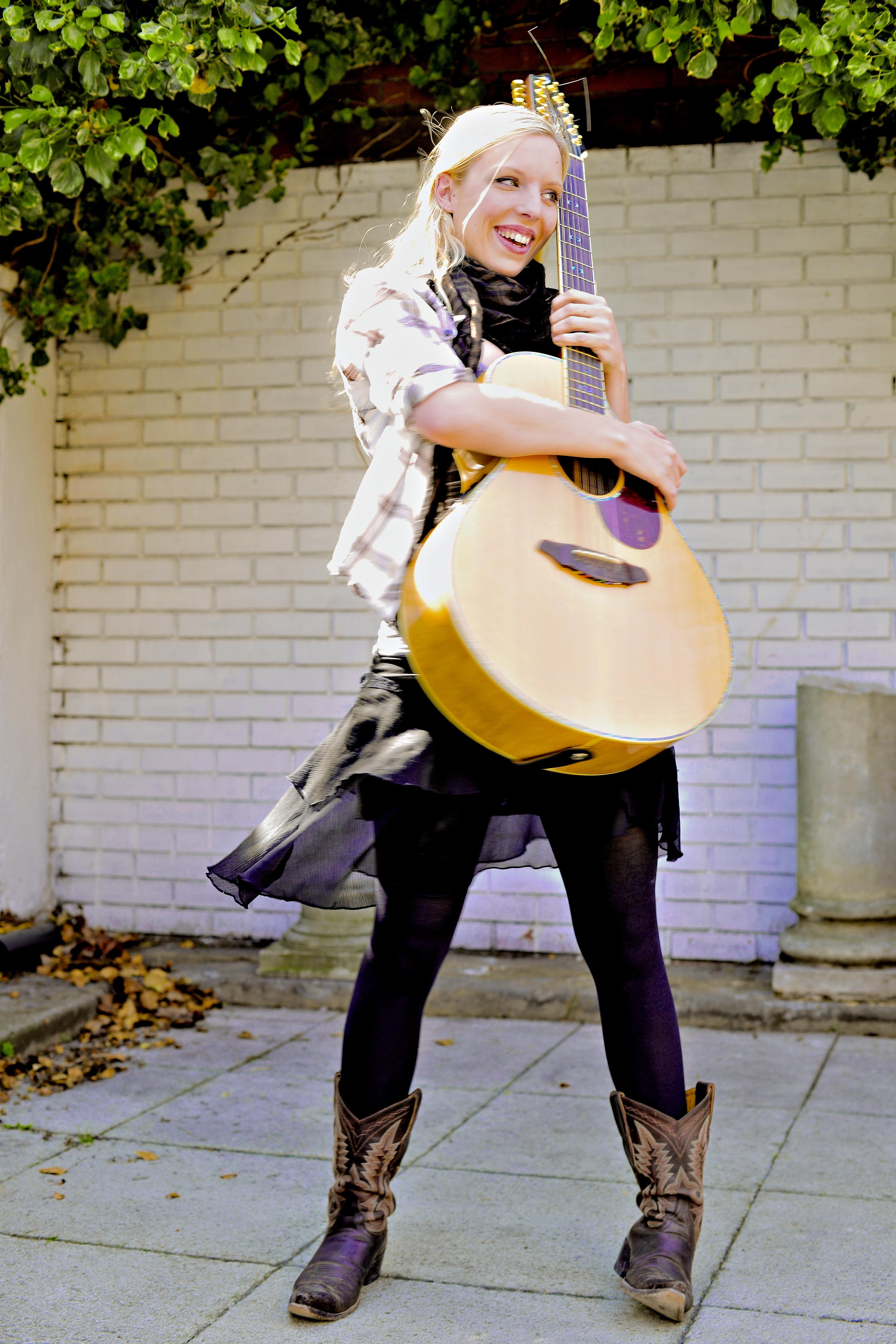
- Edmondson in 2009

Background information
- Born: Eleanor Rose Edmondson; 22 January 1986 (age 40); Hammersmith, London, England
- Genre: Folk pop
- Occupation: Musician
- Instruments: Vocals; guitar
- Years active: 2007–present
- Label: Monsoon

Eleanor Rose "Ella" Edmondson (born 22 January 1986) is an English singer-songwriter. Her primary instrument is the guitar although she can also play the piano.

== Early life ==
Eleanor Rose Edmondson was born on 22 January 1986 in Hammersmith, London. She is the eldest of three daughters of comedians Adrian Edmondson and Jennifer Saunders. She has two younger sisters, Beatrice and Freya. The majority of Edmondson's childhood was spent in Richmond before her family relocated to Devon. She attended Exeter School where she wrote songs as part of her music GCSE.

== Career ==
Edmondson became a fan of death metal because it was the only music that her father did not like. She went through a goth phase as a teenager and became a satanist. She worked as a snowboarding instructor in Canada, a barmaid and a painter and decorator before deciding to focus on music full-time after being encouraged by her father. She "got the bug" after supporting Jools Holland at the Plymouth Pavilions.

She received her first guitar as a Christmas present from her father and taught herself to play by copying him. Her first gig was at 16 supporting Thousand Natural Shocks in Exeter. She made an appearance in an episode of her mother's sitcom Jam and Jerusalem in 2006 performing "Breathe". In 2007, she released her first EP, Blame Amy, and appeared on the compilation Folk Rising. Her debut album, Hold Your Horses, was released on 16 February 2009, on her father's Monsoon record label.

In 2010, she toured as the supporting act to her father's punk-inspired folk act The Bad Shepherds.

== Personal life ==
Edmondson married Dan Furlong on 30 September 2010 and together they have three children.
