= Keturah Sorrell =

British opera singer

Keturah Sadler (10 September 1912 – 30 March 2012), better known by her stage name Keturah Sorrell, was a British opera singer and later a background actress.

== Early life ==
Sorrell was born in Middlesbrough, North Riding of Yorkshire, England to John W. Sorrell and Jenny Kennedy. She attended Middlesbrough High School.

== Career as a singer ==
She sang in Gilbert and Sullivan productions for the Redcar Operatic Society and studied after her marriage in 1939 at the Royal College of Music where she was encouraged by George Dyson. After graduating, she joined Sadler's Wells Opera where she sang Esmeralda in The Bartered Bride opposite Peter Pears. Other leading roles at Sadler's Wells were in The Marriage of Figaro, Il tabarro, and Gretel in Hansel and Gretel.

In 1947, Sorrell became the principal soprano for the Intimate Opera Company. During World War II she toured with the Council for the Encouragement of Music and the Arts (CEMA), the precursor of the Arts Council of Great Britain, and in 1950 she toured North America with Intimate Opera.

== Career as an actress ==
At the age of 68, Sorrell embarked on a new career in television as a supporting artiste or uncredited extra, though on a number of occasions she was credited at the end of the programme.

Sorrell first appearance was in a Scottish wedding sketch in Not the Nine O'Clock News. She was a regular on the 1990s British sitcom series Waiting for God, appearing in over 25 episodes as a resident of the Bayview retirement home. She also appeared in Ever Decreasing Circles, The Bill, EastEnders, House of Cards, Law and Disorder, Drop the Dead Donkey, A Bit of Fry & Laurie, two episodes of Birds of a Feather, an early episode of One Foot in the Grave in 1990 as a participant in an evening yoga class, as well as in Victoria Wood's television film Pat and Margaret in 1994 as a resident in an old people's home.

== Personal life and death ==
Sorrell's husband, Eric Sadler, whom she married in 1939, was a journalist. The couple had a son together, Paul K Sadler (born 1947). Eric Sadler died in 1999.

Sorrell died of natural causes in 2012, aged 99.
