= Simon Brint =

English musician and comedian (1950–2011)

- Born: Simon Tracey Brint; 26 September 1950; High Ham, Somerset, England
- Died: 29 May 2011 (aged 60); Langport, Somerset, England
- Occupation: Musician
- Spouse: Amanda Cockerton (m. 2003)

Simon Tracey Brint (26 September 1950 – 29 May 2011) was a British musician, best known for his role as part of the comedy duo Raw Sex with Rowland Rivron. He also composed for many British television comedy and drama programmes.

== Early life ==
Son of Stephen Brint and Anne Tracey (née Watts), Simon Brint was born in High Ham, Somerset. His father, from a large working-class family, had lied about his age to join the army; his mother was the St Anne's College, Oxford-educated daughter of a high court judge. The Brint family moved to Hythe in Kent when he was 16, and he developed an interest in eccentric musical projects. Brint studied at Reading University, graduating in English literature in 1972, before taking part in various artistic collaborations as both a musician and prop designer. He worked with the artist Anthony Benjamin, the singer and tightrope walker Hermine Demoriane, and theatre director Ken Campbell, as well as helping to disguise elephants as mammoths for the film Quest for Fire and co-writing, with Simon Wallace, the music for the Oscar-winning short A Shocking Accident in 1982.

== Career ==
In the late 1970s, he began working regularly at the Blitz club in central London, where he met drummer and comedian Rowland Rivron and pianist Rod Melvin. They became the house band at The Comic Strip club and Brint subsequently wrote several scores for the ensuing television series, The Comic Strip Presents... With Rivron, he also developed the comedy music act Raw Sex, in which he performed as the strait-laced father of the dissolute Rivron, most famously on the French and Saunders show. Raw Sex were also the house band on several comedy tours around this time, including Kevin Turvey and the Bastard Squad Featuring The Young Ones, Live, Nigel Planer's Neil's Bad Karma in the UK Tour (with The Wow Show, whose television series Hello Mum Brint contributed written material to), and French and Saunders' 1990 tour. He also continued to work as a composer for other TV comedy series, including Bottom (producing versions of BB's Blues and Last Night with the specially-formed group The Bum Notes), Hippies (which he also sang the theme tune to), Absolutely Fabulous, 2point4 Children (writing the song 'Age' performed by Gary Olsen), music and dozens of songs for multiple incarnations of The Lenny Henry Show, all of Alexei Sayle's television work, Comic Relief (on which he was resident composer), A Bit of Fry & Laurie (producing all of Hugh Laurie's songs for the fourth and final series), the comedy specials Tracey Ullman: A Class Act and Tracey Ullman Takes on New York, the musical episodes of Two Pints of Lager and a Packet of Crisps, Lazarus and Dingwall and Murder Most Horrid, as well as television drama including London's Burning and Monarch of the Glen.

As an actor, he appeared in several episodes of The Comic Strip Presents (his biggest role being that of a doctor in the episode Queen of the Wild Frontier), the film Eat the Rich (as Dickie the pianist), Saturday Live, Girls on Top (as half of 'Shelley's People') and four series and one special of French and Saunders, in which he played various roles as a member of the supporting cast in addition to his regular role as Ken Bishop and occasional appearances as himself. He also appeared on-screen with Rivron in the final ever episode of A Bit of Fry and Laurie, providing the rhythm section for Hugh Laurie's "A Sophisticated Song".

Brint and Rivron created a Raw Sex feature film, the partially-improvised comedy There's No Business..., which was released on VHS in 1994, starring Brint as Ken Bishop. The duo ceased to appear on the French and Saunders series from the 1994 special onward (their role having been gradually decreased by incoming producer Jon Plowman), but Brint continued to provide music until the show ended in 2009 and his singing voice (occasionally as Ken) was frequently heard. His final television appearance as Ken Bishop was on the 1998 documentary First on Four.

Though most of Brint's musical work remained commercially unreleased, a few items appeared in shops. A 1999 EMI Gold compilation of London's Burning soundtrack cues included his work for the series and in 2001, BBC Music released a dedicated compilation of his work for Monarch of the Glen. Additionally, his themes for Bottom and the Joanna Lumley series Girl Friday turned up on the compilation album The Best of British Television. As a producer for other artists, he oversaw Victoria Wood's single "The Smile Song" (released in 1991 as the B-side of Hale and Pace's "The Stonk") and the debut EP of Ella Edmondson. There were unfinished attempts at assaulting shop shelves too – 1992 saw an aborted attempt to release "Christmas Is Charity" in time for that year's Christmas charts, a comedy single produced by Brint and co-written with Charlie Higson and performed by Harry Enfield and Paul Whitehouse as characters Smashie and Nicey. In 1990, the majority of work for Raw Sex: The Album was completed for Sony BMG, featuring assorted guest comedians performing assorted cover songs with the band, but the project was shelved. In his autobiography, Rowland Rivron attributes the cancellation to BMG's UK operations concentrating almost entirely on marketing Take That.

== Later years and death ==
In 2004, Brint helped set up a charity, Action for Music, to help undiscovered musicians in Kenya and later worked as a composer for the Kenyan television soap opera Makutano Junction. In 2010, he founded The Idiot Bastard Band with Edmondson, Rivron, Phill Jupitus and Neil Innes, which had been planning a nationwide tour and an LP for 2012. The initial rounds of Idiot Bastard Band gigs, incorporating original comedy songs, oddball cover versions, guest comedians and some resurrected Raw Sex routines, became Brint's final public appearances. His last television work saw him compose and produce music for Bellamy's People and The One Ronnie in 2010.

Brint was married to Amanda (née Cockerton) from 2003. He had four brothers. He was the godfather of one of the daughters of comedians Adrian Edmondson and Jennifer Saunders.

Brint died by suicide on 29 May 2011 at the age of 60. His death was made public the following month via social networks by several of his friends and colleagues. Describing him as a "celebrated nonconformist", Adrian Edmondson wrote of Brint:

"He had a phenomenal gift for interpreting mood through music, and an innate sense of humour which never let the music intrude on any jokes. It was a difficult trick to pull off, but it suited his particular style of creativity, a magpie talent for collecting lots of references and making them into something entirely new that made you appreciate things in a different way."
