= Rowland Rivron =

British actor and writer

- Occupations: Writer; comedic actor; television personality
- Children: 3

Rowland Rivron is a British writer, comedic actor, and television personality.

== Early career ==
Rivron played the comic character Dr Martin Scrote on the Jonathan Ross chat show The Last Resort, and also played Scrote on Night Network's Bunker Show. This became a series for Channel 4 called Set of Six about Scrote and his brothers. In 1989 he and Jools Holland starred in The Groovy Fellers. In the early 1990s he presented his own chat show, Rivron, in which he, his guests and the entire set floated in the River Thames.

== Music ==
Aged 15, Rivron appeared on the children's TV programme Blue Peter, playing the drums. For eighteen months Rivron drummed for Jools Holland's Rhythm and Blues Orchestra. He later played with the Idiot Bastard Band, alongside Adrian Edmondson, Phill Jupitus, Simon Brint and Neil Innes. In 2004 he hosted the short-lived regional gameshow The Price of Fish. He played Alf in the BBC schools series Cats' Eyes.

He and his wife Monica (née Appleby), have three children and two dogs. The couple are avid caravanners, and Monica is the author of The Caravan Cookbook.
