= Grange Hill series 21 =

Grange Hill
- Season 21
- No. of episodes: 20

Release
- Original network: BBC One
- Original release: 27 January – 2 April 1998

Season chronology
- ← Previous; Series 20 Next → Series 22

The twenty-first series of the British television drama series Grange Hill began broadcasting on 27 January 1998, before ending on 2 April 1998 on BBC One. The series follows the lives of the staff and Students of the eponymous school, an inner-city London comprehensive school. It consists of twenty episodes.

== Cast ==
=== Students ===
- Alan Cave as Dennis Morris
- Melanie Joseph as Lauren Phillips
- Belinda Crane as Lucy Mitchell
- Steven Hammett as Dudley Wesker
- Francesca Martinez as Rachel Burns
- Amy Phillips as Jessica Arnold
- Jamie Groves as Josh Davies
- Fiona Wade as Joanna Day
- Lorraine Woodley as Carlene Joseph
- Aidan J. David as James "Arnie" Arnold
- Colin Ridgewell as Colin Brown
- Sian Welsh as Laurie Watson
- Rochelle Gadd as Delia "Dill" Lodge
- Ben Freeman as Chris Longworth
- Peter Morton as Wayne Sutcliffe
- Kate Bell as Kelly Bradshaw
- Laura Hammett as Sarah-Jane Webster
- Thomas Carey as Alec Jones
- Ayesha Antoine as Poppy Silver
- Diana Magness as Evelyn Wright
- Laura Sadler as Judi Jefferies
- Oliver Elmidoro as Tom Smith
- Charlotte McDonagh as Lisa West
- Robert Stuart as Matt Singleton
- Jonathon Marchant-Heatley as Sam "Cracker" Bacon
- Maggie Mason as Gemma Lyons
- Sally Morton as Tracy Long
- John Joseph as Ian Hudson
- Michael Obiora as Max Abassi
- Sam Bardens as Adam Hawkins
- Francesco Bruno as Franco Savi
- Jade Williams as Zoe Stringer

=== Teachers ===
- Stuart Organ as Mr Peter Robson
- Lee Cornes as Mr Jeff Hankin
- Adam Ray as Mr Tom Brisley
- Karen O'Brien as Mrs Siobhan Maguire
- Sally Geoghegan as Miss Jayne Carver
- Rachel Bell as Mrs Margaret Holmes
- Clive Hill as Mr Dai "Hard" Jones
* Dominic Carrara As Mr Christophe Urdy

=== Others ===
- David Quilter as Mr Jim Arnold
- Dominic Carrara As Mr Christophe Urdy
- Kelly George As Ray Haynes

== Episodes ==
#	Episode	Writer	Director	Original airdate
1	Episode One	Chris Ellis	Philippa Langdale	27 January 1998
The school holds a Caveman Day for the Year Seven Students. Ian Hudson ends up taking his role of "hunter" far too seriously. Gemma has fun at teacher Mr. Urdy's expense.
2	Episode Two	Chris Ellis	Philippa Langdale	29 January 1998
Adam ends up being found in the woods but his befriended dog comes back with him. Joanna steals some earrings for her mother's birthday present but she has no time for her daughter.
3	Episode Three	Diane Whitley	Philippa Langdale	3 February 1998
The Year 8 Students have to look after flour babies. Zoe and her friends are determined to learn the mystery dog they can hear. Adam ends up getting locked in at night.
4	Episode Four	Diane Whitley	Philippa Langdale	5 February 1998
The truth about Adam ends up being revealed. The flour babies are kidnapped and end up being held for ransom. Joanna makes a fool of herself at karaoke held in Ray's café.
5	Episode Five	Leigh Jackson	Giancarlo Gemin	10 February 1998
Joanna admits to her mother that she has a drink problem. Franco's indoor baseball ends up causing some problems. After Ian breaks some of Max's glasses he blames Adam.
6	Episode Six	Leigh Jackson	Giancarlo Gemin	12 February 1998
Lisa ends up using a few dirty tactics in the Snakeboard challenge. Adam actions end up causing the whole class to earn a detention. Joanna admits her drink problems to the rest of the Sixth Formers.
7	Episode Seven	Sarah Daniels	Giancarlo Gemin	17 February 1998
New Student Sean attempts to help his friend Alec get close to Judi but they need to get rid of Colin first. Adam ends up finding refuge at Miss Carver's house.
8	Episode Eight	Sarah Daniels	Giancarlo Gemin	19 February 1998
Mr. Brisley's Art show becomes very popular with Nathan. Alec ends up having no success with Judi. She is much more interested in Wayne.
9	Episode Nine	Leigh Jackson	Terry Iland	24 February 1998
Chris sleeps with Laurie whilst his parents are away but the next day he attempts to avoid her. Ian listens in as Miss Carver is talking about Adam's mum and he is soon spreading what he has heard. Adam runs away back to his old house.
10	Episode Ten	Leigh Jackson	Terry Iland	26 February 1998
Chris and Laurie end up making up. Sean manages to get even with Wayne for Alec's failure with Judi. Judi is the person who ends up paying the price though.
11	Episode Eleven	Diane Whitley	Terry Iland	3 March 1998
Following the knife attack on Judi, Wayne attempts to find the person responsible. Judi discovers that she will be left with a significant scar on her face.
12	Episode Twelve	Diane Whitley	Terry Iland	5 March 1998
Some new roller hockey equipment shows up at the school but it is not clear who will be given the chance to use it. Chris and Dill's friendship ends up progressing into something bigger. Judi meets Wayne's horrible brother.
13	Episode Thirteen	Leigh Jackson	Margy Kinmonth	10 March 1998
Franco attempts to prove that his spaghetti recipe is better than the school chefs. The Double Dare Gang attempt to work out the mystery of the stolen hockey equipment.
14	Episode Fourteen	Leigh Jackson	Margy Kinmonth	12 March 1998
Laurie ends up finding Dill and Chris together. Judi takes off her dressing. Dennis ends up suffering a tough time in the courtroom as he attempts to settle his compensation claim.
15	Episode Fifteen	Tanika Gupta	Margy Kinmonth	17 March 1998
Arnie ends up hitting Chris after he finds out about Chris's relationship with Dill. Matt plants drugs on Wayne who ends up being expelled after they fall out of his pocket during a talk on bullying.
16	Episode Sixteen	Tanika Gupta	Margy Kinmonth	19 March 1998
The Double Dare Gang manage to return the stolen hockey gear. Judi ends up realizing that the CCTV at the school could help to prove that Wayne is innocent.
17	Episode Seventeen	Sarah Daniels	Paul Annett	24 March 1998
Judi's CCTV video footage is replaced by Sean who manages to convince Matt to lie low for a while. Wayne and Judi end up at Matt's front door.
18	Episode Eighteen	Sarah Daniels	Paul Annett	26 March 1998
Mrs. Holmes believes there is a rodent infestation at the school after Cracker and Gemma's mice escape. Wayne is able to get Matt to agree to tell Mr. Robson the truth which sees Sean being brought to justice.
19	Episode Nineteen	Chris Ellis	Paul Annett	31 March 1998
Dennis buys Lucy a horse, but she refuses the gift. Later, he treats his friends to a great night out, but misses the important interview the next day.
20	Episode Twenty	Chris Ellis	Paul Annett	2 April 1998
There is one last surprise for Dennis which includes being reunion with old friends. The French skiing trip coach departs.

== DVD release ==
The twenty-first series of Grange Hill has never been released on DVD as of 2016.
