= Grange Hill series 20 =

Grange Hill
- Season 20
- No. of episodes: 20

Release
- Original network: BBC One
- Original release: 21 January – 27 March 1997

Season chronology
- ← Previous; Series 19 Next → Series 21

The twentieth series of the British television drama series Grange Hill began broadcasting on 21 January 1997, before ending on 27 March 1997 on BBC One. The series follows the lives of the staff and Students of the eponymous school, an inner-city London comprehensive school. It consists of twenty episodes.

== Cast ==
=== Students ===
- Alan Cave as Dennis Morris
- Melanie Joseph as Lauren Phillips
- Belinda Crane as Lucy Mitchell
- Steven Hammett as Dudley Wesker
- Francesca Martinez as Rachel Burns
- Amy Phillips as Jessica Arnold
- Jamie Groves as Josh Davies
- Fiona Wade as Joanna Day
- Lorraine Woodley as Carlene Joseph
- Aidan J. David as James "Arnie" Arnold
- Colin Ridgewell as Colin Brown
- Rochelle Gadd as Delia "Dill" Lodge
- Sian Welsh as Laurie Watson
- Ben Freeman as Chris Longworth
- Peter Morton as Wayne Sutcliffe
- Kate Bell as Kelly Bradshaw
- Laura Hammett as Sarah-Jane Webster
- Thomas Carey as Alec Jones
- Ayesha Antoine as Poppy Silver
- Diana Magness as Evelyn Wright
- Laura Sadler as Judi Jefferies
- Oliver Elmidoro as Tom Smith
- Charlotte McDonagh as Lisa West
- Robert Stuart as Matt Singleton
- Jonathon Marchant-Heatley as Sam "Cracker" Bacon
- Maggie Mason as Gemma Lyons
- Sally Morton as Tracy Long

=== Teachers ===
- Stuart Organ as Mr Peter Robson
- Lee Cornes as Mr Jeff Hankin
- Adam Ray as Mr Tom Brisley
- Karen O'Brien as Mrs Siobhan Maguire
- Sally Geoghegan as Miss Jayne Carver
- Rachel Bell as Mrs Margaret Holmes
- Clive Hill as Mr Dai "Hard" Jones

=== Others ===
- David Quilter as Mr Jim Arnold
- Kelly George (actor) as Ray Haynes
- David Case as Russell Joseph

== Episodes ==
#	Episode	Writer	Director	Original airdate
1	Episode One	Alison Fisher	Adrian Bean	21 January 1997
It's Human Rights Day: a metal cage occupied to represent a prisoner of conscience. Dudley's hardened steel padlock, supposedly keeping Josh's motorbike safe, makes Kevin rather more securely imprisoned than his mother would like.
2	Episode Two	Alison Fisher	Adrian Bean	23 January 1997
Lucy meets her widowed dad's new girlfriend, but it's Dennis who makes an instant rapport with her. Sarah-Jane sees Judi's little brother steal sausages.
3	Episode Three	Alison Fisher	Adrian Bean	28 January 1997
Dennis encounters Ray, a former Grange Hill Student, running a local café. Judi has to cut short her school day to pick up her brothers and Josh encounters the badge from his damaged bike on someone's bag.
4	Episode Four	Alison Fisher	Adrian Bean	30 January 1997
Judi's mother has Multiple Sclerosis. After spending time with Lucy, Dennis speeds back to rugby practice. On the way, his motorbike hits a truck, and Dennis is catapulted onto the road.
5	Episode Five	Diane Whitley	Philippa Langdale	4 February 1997
In hospital, Dennis has no feeling in his legs. Kevin's friends go round to his house, and enjoy themselves: Kevin agrees to have his hair coloured, but his mother is shocked by the results.
6	Episode Six	Diane Whitley	Philippa Langdale	6 February 1997
The Double Dare Gang spring some dares: a stink bomb onto Mr. Jones, for which Matt is almost caught, and a custard-based revenge on Alec for his outrageous toilet tax.
7	Episode Seven	Diane Whitley	Philippa Langdale	11 February 1997
Lauren and Carlene dress up for a party, are mistaken for prostitutes by the police, and Lauren is strip searched.
8	Episode Eight	Diane Whitley	Philippa Langdale	13 February 1997
A party at Lauren's house gets out of control. Dai Jones misreads the signals from Miss Carver when she goes round to his house after a boxing match.
9	Episode Nine	Sarah Daniels	David Bell	18 February 1997
Hockey on skates becomes popular. When Judi's brother is hurt while she puts him to bed, Social Services start poking their noses into her home life.
10	Episode Ten	Sarah Daniels	David Bell	20 February 1997
Dennis's return to school causes headaches for Mr. Robson, Mrs. Holmes authority is undermined by Judi's Social Service helper, and Kelly gets nowhere fast with Arnie.
11	Episode Eleven	Sarah Daniels	David Bell	25 February 1997
Can the "Hill Hogs" Skate Hockey team win the day? Only if Arnie can get Kelly back, if Josh bothers to turn up and if he can swallow his pride and let Chris play Forward.
12	Episode Twelve	Sarah Daniels	David Bell	27 February 1997
Lauren's dad gets the job he wanted in Barbados. Joanna gets sacked from Ray's café. Tom performs his dare to get Mrs. Holmes suspended - in a manner of speaking!
13	Episode Thirteen	Leigh Jackson	Karen Stowe	4 March 1997
Alec gets suspended, blamed for the Double Dare Gang's trick on Mrs. Holmes. Lauren's mother finds out about her daughter's wrongful arrest, and Chris hides Joanna in his bedroom.
14	Episode Fourteen	Leigh Jackson	Karen Stowe	6 March 1997
Judi shames the bodybuilding Wayne, Kevin and Robert. Lauren's friends wish her good luck as she nears the time of her departure to Barbados.
15	Episode Fifteen	Chris Ellis	Karen Stowe	11 March 1997
Mr. Hankin demonstrates custard pies in Science, Dill has a bathroom disaster while babysitting for Mrs. Maguire and Joanna cruelly dashes Chris's hopes.
16	Episode Sixteen	Chris Ellis	Karen Stowe	13 March 1997
Rachel and Gerald photograph the staff intent on making satirical masks. Laurie calls a radio phone-in about Chris and Joanna, though not naming them - soon the truth is all round the school.
17	Episode Seventeen	Chris Ellis	Philippa Langdale	18 March 1997
Mr. Robson persuades Jessica to become editor for the school magazine. Dennis recovers in hospital, but Lucy stays away. Cracker dresses up as Mrs. Holmes for a dare.
18	Episode Eighteen	Chris Ellis	Philippa Langdale	20 March 1997
Wayne disrupts Rachel's Animal Farm project, Liam dashes Lucy's hopes and Dennis gives a bitter interview for the magazine.
19	Episode Nineteen	Tanika Gupta	Philippa Langdale	25 March 1997
The school magazine is withdrawn after Gemma's father complains about the male pin-up, but Cracker does a roaring trade in illicit photocopies.
20	Episode Twenty	Tanika Gupta	Philippa Langdale	27 March 1997
After Rachel's Animal Hill drama, it's time for the dare to beat all dares... Speedy streaks around the school, and Matt photographs his posterior with a Polaroid camera, fixing the photos to the notice boards.

== DVD release ==
The twentieth series of Grange Hill has never been released on DVD as of 2014.
