= Grange Hill series 24 =

Season of television series

Grange Hill
- Season 24
- No. of episodes: 20

Release
- Original network: BBC One
- Original release: 23 January – 29 March 2001

Season chronology
- ← Previous; Series 23 Next → Series 25

The twenty-fourth series of the British television drama series Grange Hill began broadcasting on 23 January 2001, before ending on 29 March 2001 on BBC One. The series follows the lives of the staff and Students of the eponymous school, an inner-city London comprehensive school. It consists of twenty episodes.

== Cast ==
=== Students ===
- Aidan J. David as James "Arnie" Arnold
- Colin Ridgewell as Colin Brown
- Peter Morton as Wayne Sutcliffe
- Kate Bell as Kelly Bradshaw
- Renee Montemayor as Briony Jones
- Emma Willis as Vikki Meedes
- Naomi Osei-Mensah as Claire Chaplin
- Max Brown as Danny Hartston
- Oliver Elmidoro as Tom Smith
- Charlotte McDonagh as Lisa West
- Robert Stuart as Matt Singleton
- Jonathon Marchant-Heatley as Sam "Cracker" Bacon
- Sally Morton as Tracy Long
- Jon Newman as Kieran "Ozzie" Osborne
- John Joseph as Ian Hudson
- Michael Obiora as Max Abassi
- Daniel Lee as Ben Miller
- Sam Bardens as Adam Hawkins
- Amanda Fahy as Shannon Parks
- Jessica Staveley-Taylor as Leah Stewart
- Emma Waters as Katy Fraser
- Colin White as Spencer Hargreaves
- Arnold Oceng as Calvin Braithwaite
- Jalpa Patel as Anika Modi
- Lindsey Ray as Amy Davenport
- Adam Sopp as Darren Clarke
- Kacey Barnfield as Maddie Gilks
- Matthew Buckley as Martin Miller
- Sammy O'Grady as Kathy McIlroy
- Sophie Shad as Shona West

=== Teachers ===
- Stuart Organ as Mr Peter Robson
- Lee Cornes as Mr Jeff Hankin
- Sally Geoghegan as Miss Jayne Carver
- Rachel Bell as Mrs Margaret Holmes
- Clive Hill as Mr Dai "Hard" Jones
- Judith Wright as Miss Emily Fraser
- Nicholas Caunter as Mr Michael Barton

=== Others ===
- Diana Magness as Evelyn Wright
- Simon Pearsall as Mr Don West
- La Charne Jolly as Amelia Nkebe

== Episodes ==
#	Episode	Writer	Director	Original airdate
1	Episode One	Philip Gerard	Grame Harper	23 January 2001
The building work creates havoc - and a fire. Shannon decides that she is a prefect, Danny Hartston makes an enemy of Mr. Hankin, and Spencer's dad gets sent to jail for two years.
2	Episode Two	Philip Gerard	Grame Harper	25 January 2001
Ozzie hatches a plan to get the school keys, using self-elected prefect Shannon who in turn delegates the task to Kathy and Martin. Mr. Hankin takes a dislike to Danny Hartston.
3	Episode Three	Paul Smith	Graeme Harper	30 January 2001
Spider frenzy sweeps school, Clare and Vikki start the lunchtime fitness club and Lisa's mother walks out.
4	Episode Four	Paul Smith	Graeme Harper	1 February 2001
Martin, Maddie and Shona explore the basement. Ozzie steals the building plans and when the builders start demolishing the wrong walls, they strike a water pipe, causing a flood.
5	Episode Five	Philip Gladwin	Dez McCarthy	6 February 2001
Tom asks Leah out, Mr. Hankin gives a lecture against smoking, and a meeting about a black refugee sparks off a racist conflict against Nathan and Briony.
6	Episode Six	Philip Gladwin	Dez McCarthy	8 February 2001
Arnie and Wayne use a ruse to get Claire and Vikki out on a date, Ozzie continues his campaign against Mr. Hankin and Mrs. Holmes is seen with her "toy boy".
7	Episode Seven	Suzie Smith	Dez McCarthy	13 February 2001
Mr. Hankin becomes increasingly certain that Danny Hartson is behind a hate campaign against him, and Mrs. Holmes reveals that the mystery man is her son, Michael.
8	Episode Eight	Eanna O’Lochlainn	Dez McCarthy	15 February 2001
Shona and Lisa's mum is not really coming back, and her boyfriend is waiting in the car. The next day, Maddie suggests that giving someone else a hard time will make Shona feel better so she pretends she has been bitten by a tarantula. Later, in class, Shona has a weird bite-like mark on her arm. Some of the year sevens tell the teacher but she thinks they are messing about again. Then Shona faints. Was she telling the truth all the time?
9	Episode Nine	Mark Hiser & Bridget Colgan	Dominic MacDonald	20 February 2001
Danny's initialled footprint is found in the fresh concrete, Darren's parents act suspiciously and the staff have a sneaky play at Darren's game console.
10	Episode Ten	Sarah Daniels	Dominic MacDonald	22 February 2001
Shannon arrives at Lisa's party and says that Danny Hartson dumped her, Miss Fraser makes a new friend, and Darren encounters a strange girl in the middle of the night.
11	Episode Eleven	Sarah Daniels	Dominic MacDonald	27 February 2001
Mr. Hankin accuses Danny of breaking into his home, but then Danny's troubles deepen when Shannon claims she spent the night with him.
12	Episode Twelve	Si Spencer	Dominic MacDonald	1 March 2001
Maddie sends a fake email to Kathy, Mr. Abbott gets a surprise birthday treat, and Tom has sex with Leah, but afterwards Leah tells Shannon she didn't want it.
13	Episode Thirteen	Tara Byrne	Sue Butterworth	6 March 2001
Shannon comes clean about her imaginary affair with Danny. Refugee girl Amelia is smuggled into school to alleviate her boredom, but in the evening, the police come knocking at the door.
14	Episode Fourteen	Carolyn Sally Jones	Sue Butterworth	8 March 2001
There's a shock for Lisa when her mother reveals she is pregnant by boyfriend Dave, and Mr. Hankin gives a talk on testicular cancer.
15	Episode Fifteen	Lin Coghlan	Sue Butterworth	13 March 2001
Shannon tells Tom that he raped Leah, Tracy and Lisa both have their sights set on the talent competition, and when hidden refugee Amelia decides to do a midnight flit, Darren goes with her.
16	Episode Sixteen	Lin Coghlan	Sue Butterworth	15 March 2001
Matt has worries about cancer, Max gets publicity for his protest against company logos on sports strips, and Lisa and Tracy's dispute over Tom flares up into a fight.
17	Episode Seventeen	Suzie Smith	Angela De Chastelai Smith	20 March 2001
Shona behaves badly, Kathy discovers that Martin has Asperger's, Amy and Anika find where Darren and Amelia have been hiding, and Mr. Hankin tenders his resignation.
18	Episode Eighteen	Philip Gerard	Angela De Chastelai Smith	22 March 2001
When Danny and Ozzie come to blows in the boiler room, Mr. Hankin overhears both sides, but as he enters, the ceiling caves in trapping them all.
19	Episode Nineteen	Philip Gerard	Angela De Chastelai Smith	27 March 2001
Amelia is abducted, Kathy and Martin find evidence of foul play on the part of Mr. Forbes, and things look bad for Danny, Ozzie and Mr. Hankin, trapped in the old boiler room.
20	Episode Twenty	Si Spencer	Angela De Chastelai Smith	29 March 2001
Mr. Forbes and Ozzie are arrested, Lisa and Tracey are reconciled, Kelly makes her point, and Wayne's band perform at the talent show, but Ray pays the price for shopping the racist thugs.

== DVD release ==
The twenty-fourth series of Grange Hill has never been released on DVD as of 2014.
