= Grange Hill series 23 =

Grange Hill
- Season 23
- No. of episodes: 20

Release
- Original network: BBC One
- Original release: 25 January – 30 March 2000

Season chronology
- ← Previous; Series 22 Next → Series 24

The twenty-third series of the British television drama series Grange Hill began broadcasting on 25 January 2000, before ending on 30 March 2000 on BBC One. The series follows the lives of the staff and Students of the eponymous school, an inner-city London comprehensive school. It consists of twenty episodes.

== Cast ==
=== Students ===
- Aidan J. David as James "Arnie" Arnold
- Colin Ridgewell as Colin Brown
- Peter Morton as Wayne Sutcliffe
- Kate Bell as Kelly Bradshaw
- Laura Hammett as Sarah-Jane Webster
- Diana Magness as Evelyn Wright
- Oliver Elmidoro as Tom Smith
- Charlotte McDonagh as Lisa West
- Robert Stuart as Matt Singleton
- Jonathon Marchant-Heatley as Sam "Cracker" Bacon
- Sally Morton as Tracy Long
- John Joseph as Ian Hudson
- Michael Obiora as Max Abassi
- Daniel Lee as Ben Miller
- Sam Bardens as Adam Hawkins
- Francesco Bruno as Franco Savi
- Emma Waters as Katy Fraser
- Colin White as Spencer Hargreaves
- Arnold Oceng as Calvin Braithwaite
- Jalpa Patel as Anika Modi
- Lindsey Ray as Amy Davenport
- Adam Sopp as Darren Clarke

=== Teachers ===
- Stuart Organ as Mr Peter Robson
- Lee Cornes as Mr Jeff Hankin
- Sally Geoghegan as Miss Jayne Carver
- Rachel Bell as Mrs Margaret Holmes
- Clive Hill as Mr Dai "Hard" Jones
- Judith Wright as Miss Emily Fraser

=== Others ===
- Dominic Power as Simon Watson
- Renee Montemayor as Briony Jones
- David Schaal (actor) as Tom Hargreaves

== Episodes ==
#	Episode	Writer	Director	Original airdate
1	Episode One	Tim O'Mara	Geoff Feld	25 January 2000
The school are due a visit from Ofsted. Dill has a chance to go to New York. Spencer sees to his father's racist brutality first hand.
2	Episode Two	Tim O'Mara	Geoff Feld	27 January 2000
Matt discovers that his four friends are now in couples. Arnie holds back from Dill back about her trip abroad.
3	Episode Three	Jeff Povey	Geoff Feld	1 February 2000
Adam is photographed at the school gates. Mr. Robson is determined to be ready for the Ofsted visit. Anika bangs her head after being pushed over by Spencer.
4	Episode Four	Jeff Povey	Geoff Feld	3 February 2000
Matt's blind date with Lisa's cousin doesn't go quite the way he had hoped. Spencer ends up being left home alone. Arnie collapses at the airport after Dill leaves for New York.
5	Episode Five	Tanika Gupta	Matthew Napier	8 February 2000
Colin and Kelly discover that Mr. Hankin has been moonlighting as a stand-up comedian. Spencer remains on his own at home.
6	Episode Six	Tanika Gupta	Matthew Napier	10 February 2000
Wayne and Sarah-Jane try to find Alec. Colin nearly reveals the truth about Evelyn's age. Matt has an awful meeting with a potential new girlfriend.
7	Episode Seven	Philip Gerard	Matthew Napier	15 February 2000
Evelyn and Simon's relationship continues to grow. Arnie collapses whilst out at a night club.
8	Episode Eight	Philip Gerard	Matthew Napier	17 February 2000
Colin manages to get the job presenting on television. Wayne manages to find a clue about Alec's location. Spencer attempts to make amends.
9	Episode Nine	Sarah Daniels	Jeremy Webb	22 February 2000
Wayne continues to try to find Alec. Adam's meeting with his father doesn't go that well.
10	Episode Ten	Sarah Daniels	Jeremy Webb	24 February 2000
Miss Carver ends up being seen in a bad light during the Ofsted visit. Anika and Amy attempt to help Spencer clean up the house. Evelyn is concerned that she could be pregnant. Arnie learns that he has epilepsy.
11	Episode Eleven	Philip Gladwin	Jeremy Webb	29 February 2000
Adam feelings about Miss Carver are shown in front of an Ofsted inspector. Spencer's house is cleaned up.
12	Episode Twelve	Michael Butt	Jeremy Webb	2 March 2000
Wayne finally catches up with Alec. The school inspection is finally over. Spencer's mother ends up returning.
13	Episode Thirteen	Eanna O'Lochlainn	Matthew Napier	7 March 2000
Franco's leg is broken when Adam tackles him on the football pitch. Adam's father intervenes when he is attacked by Ian. Evelyn is shocked when Simon begins teaching at the school.
14	Episode Fourteen	Judy Forshaw	Sue Butterworth	9 March 2000
Amy and Anika are given a tour by Colin of the television studios. The Double Dare Gang finally give up their enforced dating. Katy and the boys end up making a shocking discovery while camping.
15	Episode Fifteen	Judy Forshaw	Susan Butterworth	14 March 2000
Wayne begins a cardboard collection scheme to try to help the homeless. Mr. Robson is surprised to discover that Adam's father is his alcohol counsellor.
16	Episode Sixteen	Lin Coghlan	Sue Butterworth	16 March 2000
Arnie ends up getting a new lease on life after giving a lift to a hitchhiker. Spencer's party comes to an end after his father makes a sudden reappearance.
17	Episode Seventeen	Suzie Smith	Penelope Shales	21 March 2000
Fund raising events take place. Mr. Hankin camps with Wayne and Alec.
18	Episode Eighteen	Paul Smith	Penelope Shales	23 March 2000
Dirty tactics ends up being used to gain more cardboard boxes. Wayne ends up finding out that the scheme is basically unprofitable. Arnie has an epileptic seizure in public.
19	Episode Nineteen	Paul Smith	Penelope Shales	28 March 2000
The staff come to school wearing period costumes. Evelyn manages to repair her friendship with Kelly. The police pay another visit to the Hargreaves house.
20	Episode Twenty	Philip Gerard	Penelope Shales	30 March 2000
The end of term arrives. Linford Christie lights the fund-raising bonfire. Mr. Hargreaves ends up turning himself into the police.

== Production and casting ==
The series was filmed at BBC Elstree Centre as well as various locations in Hertfordshire.

Returning cast members included: Stuart Organ (Peter Robson, Lee Cornes (Jeff Hankin), Sally Geoghegan (Jayne Carver), Rachel Bell as (Margaret Holmes), Clive Hill (Dai "Hard" Jones), Aidan J. David (James "Arnie" Arnold), Colin Ridgewell (Colin Brown), Peter Morton (Wayne Sutcliffe, Kate Bell (Kelly Bradshaw) Laura Hammett (Sarah-Jane Webster), Diana Magness (Evelyn Wright), Oliver Elmidoro (Tom Smith), Charlotte McDonagh (Lisa West), Robert Stuart (Matt Singleton), Jonathon Marchant-Heatley (Sam "Cracker" Bacon), Sally Morton (Tracy Long), John Joseph (Ian Hudson), Michael Obiora (Max Abassi), Daniel Lee (Ben Miller), Sam Bardens (Adam Hawkins), Francesco Bruno (Franco Savi), Colin White (Spencer Hargreaves), Arnold Oceng (Calvin Braithwaite), Jalpa Patel (Anika Modi), Lindsey Ray (Amy Davenport), and Adam Sopp (Darren Clarke). Judith Wright and Emma Waters joined as sisters, Emily and Katy Fraser; Emily is a Maths teacher and Katy is a Student, and are from Australia.

== DVD release ==
The twenty-third series of Grange Hill has never been released on DVD as of 2014.
