= Grange Hill series 22 =

Grange Hill
- Season 22
- No. of episodes: 20

Release
- Original network: BBC One
- Original release: 26 January – 1 April 1999

Season chronology
- ← Previous; Series 21 Next → Series 23

The twenty-second series of the British television drama series Grange Hill began broadcasting on 26 January 1999, before ending on 1 April 1999 on BBC One. The series follows the lives of the staff and Students of the eponymous school, an inner-city London comprehensive school. It consists of twenty episodes.

== Cast ==
=== Students ===
- Thomas Carey as Alec Jones
- Aidan J. David as James "Arnie" Arnold
- Colin Ridgewell as Colin Brown
- Peter Morton as Wayne Sutcliffe
- Kate Bell as Kelly Bradshaw
- Laura Hammett as Sarah-Jane Webster
- Diana Magness as Evelyn Wright
- Laura Sadler as Judi Jefferies
- Oliver Elmidoro as Tom Smith
- Charlotte McDonagh as Lisa West
- Robert Stuart as Matt Singleton
- Jonathon Marchant-Heatley as Sam "Cracker" Bacon
- Sally Morton as Tracy Long
- Maggie Mason as Gemma Lyons
- John Joseph as Ian Hudson
- Michael Obiora as Max Abassi
- Daniel Lee as Ben Miller
- Sam Bardens as Adam Hawkins
- Francesco Bruno as Franco Savi
- Emma Pierson as Becky Radcliffe
- Jade Williams as Zoe Stringer
- Colin White as Spencer Hargreaves
- Arnold Oceng as Calvin Braithwaite
- Jalpa Patel as Anika Modi
- Rochelle Gadd as Delia "Dill" Lodge
- Lindsey Ray as Amy Davenport
- Adam Sopp as Darren Clarke

=== Teachers ===
- Stuart Organ as Mr Peter Robson
- Lee Cornes as Mr Jeff Hankin
- Adam Ray as Mr Tom Brisley
- Sally Geoghegan as Miss Jayne Carver
- Vincenzo Nicoli as Mr. Savi
- Rachel Bell as Mrs Margaret Holmes
- Clive Hill as Mr Dai "Hard" Jones

=== Others ===
- Thomas Carey as Alec Jones

== Episodes ==
#	Episode	Writer	Director	Original airdate
1	Episode One		Paul Annett	26 January 1999
Amy suffers problems because she does not have a school uniform. Spencer soon finds himself in trouble. Alec wants to return to school as he carries out his community service. After being involved in a fight, Alec's father throws him out.
2	Episode Two		Paul Annett	28 January 1999
When Nathan throws his inhaler away, Calvin suffers an Asthma attack. Alec finally returns to school but things don't look good for his future there.
3	Episode Three	Diane Whitley	Paul Annett	2 February 1999
Max decides to learn to play the tuba. Alec and Judi end up being locked in a storeroom and a match list by Alec ends up causing a fire. Judi falls to her death after attempting to escape out of a window.
4	Episode Four	Diane Whitley	Paul Annett	4 February 1999
Judi's funeral is held as Alec continues to feel bad about what happened. Wayne, who is still convinced that Alec was responsible for her death, decides to picket outside the entrance to the café after Alec is offered a job there. Meanwhile, Max ends up losing his tuba in the canal and attempts to get it back before the concert.
5	Episode Five	Tim O'Mara	Kate Cheeseman	9 February 1999
Wayne ends up taking action against Ray's café. After Gemma discovers that her parents are planning on getting a divorce, and she won't be able to stay with her dad, she runs away.
6	Episode Six	Tim O’Mara	Kate Cheeseman	11 February 1999
Gemma's friends end up staging a protest against her having to go to boarding school. Becky ends up making Kamal look stupid for claiming he kissed her after their date.
7	Episode Seven	Sarah Daniels	Kate Cheeseman	16 February 1999
After Franco is replaced in the school football team by new Student Ben, he can't bring himself to tell his dad. Gemma's dad makes the final plans for her to go to boarding school and she has her last day as a Student at the school.
8	Episode Eight	Sarah Daniels	Kate Cheeseman	18 February 1999
At the Inter-School Final, which is about to get underway, Franco asks Max to lock Ben in the changing rooms. At the last moment, Franco changes his mind. The Double Dare Gang attempt to rescue Gemma from her new boarding school.
9	Episode Nine	Tanika Gupta	Stephen Moore	23 February 1999
Amy's lack of reading skills concern Miss Carver. Kamal and his friends attempt to repair his brother's car.
10	Episode Ten	Tanika Gupta	Stephen Moore	25 February 1999
Kamal and his friends attempt to raise the £1000 needed to renovate the car. Amy begins special classes to help improve her reading. Ben and Franco are determined to get the football trophy back.
11	Episode Eleven	Jeff Povey	Stephen Moore	2 March 1999
After Amy runs away from school, she ends up making a new friend. Zoe is determined to stop the confrontation with St. Joseph's school.
12	Episode Twelve	Jeff Povey	Stephen Moore	4 March 1999
Zoe attempts to help bring back the missing football trophy/ Amy's new friend ends up scaring Spencer. Colin's date with Becky ends up being ruined.
13	Episode Thirteen	Jeff Povey	Matthew Napier	9 March 1999
Plans are made by Lisa for a special birthday treat for Tracy. Darren finds a rabbit. Becky goes to Colin's house for dinner. Arnie ends up disobeying his father's wishes.
14	Episode Fourteen	Jeff Povey	Matthew Napier	11 March 1999
Lisa's special treat for Tracy doesn't go quite to plan after Tracey is left alone at the hotel. Becky's dad shows up with news that he wants to sell the family home.
15	Episode Fifteen	Annie Wood	Dominic MacDonald	16 March 1999
Lisa and Matt manage to repair their friendship. Nathan fails his driving test. Sarah-Jane is dependent on the pills she is taking and is walking around in a complete daze.
16	Episode Sixteen	Annie Wood	Dominic MacDonald	18 March 1999
Mrs. Holmes ends up volunteering for the Outward Bound course, much to Mr. Jones's dismay. Kamal and Colin's visit to Brighton ends up turning into a complete nightmare.
17	Episode Seventeen	Sarah Daniels	Geoff Feld	23 March 1999
Colin attempts to make Kamal talk to the police and he stays away from Becky who assumes he no longer wants to see her. Cracker manages to get a part-time job at the café.
18	Episode Eighteen	Sarah Daniels	Geoff Feld	25 March 1999
Wayne finds out that Sarah-Jane has become addicted to anti-depressants whilst they are on the Outward Bound trip. Becky learns the truth from Colin about the accident.
19	Episode Nineteen	Tim O’Mara	Geoff Feld	30 March 1999
Colin tells the police about the accident and they later question Kamal. The rest of the sixth formers learn about what happened.
20	Episode Twenty	Tim O’Mara	Geoff Feld	1 April 1999
Kamal ends up being given a heavy fine for his driving offences and manages to sort things out with Colin. Sarah-Jane finally requests help from Wayne. Cracker's sandwich scheme is discovered.

== DVD release ==
The twenty-second series of Grange Hill has never been released on DVD as of 2023.
