= Grange Hill series 25 =

Grange Hill
- Season 25
- No. of episodes: 18

Release
- Original network: BBC One
- Original release: 29 January – 28 March 2002

Season chronology
- ← Previous; Series 24 Next → Series 26

The twenty-fifth series of the British television drama series Grange Hill began broadcasting on 29 January 2002, before ending on 28 March 2002 on BBC One. The series follows the lives of the staff and Students of the eponymous school, an inner-city London comprehensive school. It consists of eighteen episodes.

== Cast ==
=== Students ===
- Marcel McCalla as Nathan Charles
- Renee Montemayor as Briony Jones
- Emma Willis as Vikki Meedes
- Naomi Osei-Mensah as Claire Chaplin
- Max Brown as Danny Hartston
- Reggie Yates as Carl Fenton
- Oliver Elmidoro as Tom Smith
- Charlotte McDonagh as Lisa West
- Robert Stuart as Matt Singleton
- Jonathon Marchant-Heatley as Sam "Cracker" Bacon
- Jon Newman as Kieran "Ozzie" Osborne
- John Joseph as Ian Hudson
- Michael Obiora as Max Abassi
- Daniel Lee as Ben Miller
- Amanda Fahy as Shannon Parks
- Jessica Staveley-Taylor as Leah Stewart
- Colin White as Spencer Hargreaves
- Arnold Oceng as Calvin Braithwaite
- Jalpa Patel as Anika Modi
- Lindsey Ray as Amy Davenport
- Adam Sopp as Darren Clarke
- Matthew Buckley as Martin Miller
- Sammy O'Grady as Kathy McIlroy
- Kacey Barnfield as Maddie Gilks
- Sophie Shad as Shona West

=== Teachers ===
- Stuart Organ as Mr Peter Robson
- Lee Cornes as Mr Jeff Hankin
- Sally Geoghegan as Miss Jayne Carver
- Rachel Bell as Mrs Margaret Holmes
- Clive Hill as Mr Dai "Hard" Jones
- Judith Wright as Miss Emily Fraser
- Nicholas Caunter as Mr Michael Barton
- Nicholas Tizzard as Mr Stephen Deverill

=== Others ===
- Jenny Galloway as Miss Hattie Davenport
- Simon Pearsall as Mr Don West
- Sara Stockbridge as Suzie Gilks
- Sakuntala Ramanee as Mrs Modi
- Mirren Delaney as Lynn
- Nicholas Saich as Guy
- Peter Shea as Chris
- Victoria Goddard as Tina
- Ralph Arliss as Chaz Smith
- Natasha Byrne as Jo
- Fiona Corkery as Louise
- Linette Beaumont as Zoe Hartfield
- Dean Harris as Mr Hudson
- Amanda Harrison as Terri
- Lenor Munroe as Alison
- Steven Di Meo as Rob

== Episodes ==
#	Episode	Writer	Director	Original airdate
1	Episode One	Si Spencer	Dez McCarthy	29 January 2002
Elections are held for the position of editor of the school website. Lisa is attacked and hurt as is Mr. Robson in his efforts to catch the person responsible.
2	Episode Two	Si Spencer	Dez McCarthy	31 January 2002
Anika becomes editor of the website. Mr. Robson recovers in hospital following the attack. Maddie gets Shona drunk and her dad decides both Shona and Lisa should live with their mother.
3	Episode Three	Sarah Daniels	Dez McCarthy	5 February 2002
Amy begins to search for her father. Work on the school website gets underway. Lunchtime step aerobics classes begin at the school. Lisa is scared following the attack.
4	Episode Four	Sarah Daniels	Dez McCarthy	7 February 2002
Amy writes a letter to her long lost father and her mother ends up giving her worrying news. Vikki finishes things with Danny when she finds out he's not going to university.
5	Episode Five	Tara Byrne	Dominic McDonald	12 February 2002
Amy ends up staying with Anika while her mum is in hospital. Nathan is revealed as having kept a secret from Briony.
6	Episode Six	Tara Byrne	Dominic MacDonald	14 February 2002
Briony finds out about Nathan's other girlfriend. Maddie is made fun of. Ozzie's new night club impresses Cracker.
7	Episode Seven	Philip Gerard	Dominic MacDonald	19 February 2002
The "No means No" report is removed from the school website. Calvin and Darren's Deostini card selling days come to an end. Amy finds out that her mum has cancer.
8	Episode Eight	Philip Gerald	Dominic MacDonald	21 February 2002
Mrs. Holmes' actions cause concern. Danny and Vikki end up being reunited. Cracker decides to quit school and take a job in the new night club.
9	Episode Nine	Helen Eatock	Brett Fallis	26 February 2002
Mr. Deverill starts a positive discipline regime at the school. Cracker starts working at the club after leaving school. Chris sets Ozzie a challenge to prove his worth at the club.
10	Episode Ten	Lisselle Kayla	Brett Fallis	28 February 2002
Ray goes to see Lisa. Ian is picked on by Mr. Deverill. Leah admits the truth. Danny and Vikki's celebration is ruined by Ozzie.
11	Episode Eleven	Rachel Dawson	Brett Fallis	5 March 2002
After Leah and Shannon are involved in a fight they are given a Saturday detention by Mr. Deverill. Miss Fraser reveals to her Students that she is engaged but her fiancé, Michael Barton, is not pleased.
12	Episode Twelve	Si Spencer	Brett Fallis	7 March 2002
Maddie, Leah, Shannon, Martin and Ian reflect on life during the Saturday detention session. Amy meets Chaz at a record fair and her mother later collapses.
13	Episode Thirteen	Philip Gladwin	John Dower	12 March 2002
Amy receives some bad news from her mother. Maddie's party doesn't go to plan. Mr. Robson announces to the rest of the staff that he plans to resign.
14	Episode Fourteen	Philip Gerard	John Dower	14 March 2002
Mr. Deverill hits Ian after he loses his temper. Ozzie attempts to get closer to Vicki. Tom reveals he has been working part time as a model.
15	Episode Fifteen	Lin Coghlan	John Dower	19 March 2002
The staff go to Miss Fraser's barbecue. Lisa watches Tom as he takes part in a modelling assignment. Amy's mum ends up losing her battle with cancer.
16	Episode Sixteen	Helen Eatock	John Dower	21 March 2002
Ben and Max discover Mr. Deverill's previous life as Mr. Wilcox. Ozzie ends up winning the bet with Chris. Leah leaves school. Tom's modelling pictures are published.
17	Episode Seventeen	Sarah Daniels	Mark Sendell	26 March 2002
Maddie ends up making a stand. Ozzy is shown by Chris the counterfeit money he has been laundering. Ian and Ben manage to find the proof they need about Mr. Deverill.
18	Episode Eighteen	Si Spencer	Mark Sendell	28 March 2002
The truth about Mr. Deverill is exposed. Mr. Robson and Miss Carver hold their wedding reception at the school. A fire has devastating results.

== DVD release ==
The twenty-fifth series of Grange Hill has never been released on DVD as of 2014.
