= Grange Hill series 19 =

Grange Hill
- Season 19
- No. of episodes: 20

Release
- Original network: BBC One
- Original release: 23 January – 28 March 1996

Season chronology
- ← Previous; Series 18 Next → Series 20

The nineteenth series of the British television drama series Grange Hill began broadcasting on 23 January 1996, before ending on 28 March 1996 on BBC One. The series follows the lives of the staff and Students of the eponymous school, an inner-city London comprehensive school. It consists of twenty episodes.

== Cast ==
=== Students ===
- Jamie Lehane as Russell "Jacko" Morgan
- Natalie Poyser as Becky Stevens
- Margo Selby as Julie Corrigan
- Nina Fry as Robyn Stone
- Darren Kempson as Gabriel
- Abigail Hart as Paula Webster
- Martino Lazzeri as Joe Williams
- Lisa Hammond as Denny
- Alan Cave as Dennis Morris
- Melanie Joseph as Lauren Phillips
- Belinda Crane as Lucy Mitchell
- Steven Hammett as Dudley Wesker
- Natalie Tapper as Jodie Abedayo
- Francesca Martinez as Rachel Burns
- Amy Phillips as Jessica Arnold
- Jamie Groves as Josh Davies
- Fiona Wade as Joanna Day
- Aidan J. David as James "Arnie" Arnold
- Colin Ridgewell as Colin Brown
- Jenny Long as Anna Wright
- Sian Welsh as Laurie Watson
- Rochelle Gadd as Delia "Dill" Lodge
- Ben Freeman as Chris Longworth
- Peter Morton as Wayne Sutcliffe
- Kate Bell as Kelly Bradshaw
- Laura Hammett as Sarah-Jane Webster
- Thomas Carey as Alec Jones
- Ayesha Antoine as Poppy Silver
- George Stark as Kevin Jenkins
- Diana Magness as Evelyn Wright

=== Teachers ===
- Stuart Organ as Mr Peter Robson
- Lee Cornes as Mr Jeff Hankin
- Adam Ray as Mr Tom Brisley
- Peter Leeper as Mr Malcolm Parrott
- Karen O'Brien as Mrs Siobhan Maguire
- Sally Geoghegan as Miss Jayne Carver

=== Others ===
- David Quilter as Mr Jim Arnold
- David Case as Russell Joseph

== Episodes ==
No.	Episode	Writer	Director	Original airdate
1	Episode One	Chris Ellis	Steven Andrew	23 January 1996
Jessica is unwell, and boyfriend Joe seems to have lost interest. Wayne has an air pistol, and finds that Kevin is a surprisingly good shot. Wayne wants to know how good he is with a live target, so they go to an animal sanctuary...
2	Episode Two	Chris Ellis	Steven Andrew	25 January 1996
Jessica publicly dumps Joe and then collapses. Kevin has Wayne's air-gun, but Wayne chooses the Maths lesson to ask it to be returned. As Kevin takes out the gun, Mr. Davies enters and demands to see what's in everyone's bag.
3	Episode Three	Ol Parker	Steven Andrew	30 January 1996
Kevin accidentally shoots Sarah-Jane with the air gun. He doesn't tell the police whose gun it really is. Jessica goes to collect the results of her blood test.
4	Episode Four	Ol Parker	Steven Andrew	1 February 1996
Jessica is diagnosed with M.E, but has an offer to stay with an Aunt in California. Dennis uses this as a business opportunity - importing cheap jackets - but Arnie quashes the idea.
5	Episode Five	Alison Fisher	Karen Stowe	6 February 1996
Julie returns to school from her time in Spain. Mrs. Maguire announces that she's pregnant. Poppy brings a precious photo to school, but Wayne trips her up, and it is smashed.
6	Episode Six	Alison Fisher	Karen Stowe	8 February 1996
Dudley is stalking Joanna. Robyn gets the blame for a mistake in allocating homes for the French Exchange scheme.
7	Episode Seven	Alison Fisher	Karen Stowe	13 February 1996
The sixth formers are paid to monitor bullying. The French exchange kids arrive, and Arnie takes a fancy to Edith - if only he can summon the courage to ask her to go to the disco...
8	Episode Eight	Alison Fisher	Karen Stowe	15 February 1996
Julie tells Robyn about her Spanish romance. At the French disco, there's a disagreement about the music, Robyn dances with Mr. Parrott, and the Year 9 peasants revolt against the high refreshment prices.
9	Episode Nine	Sarah Daniels	Adrian Bean	20 February 1996
A clear up is done after the disco, Chris invents a fight to cover up his strict parents' limitation on his social life, and Julie is convinced to give a talk on bullying.
10	Episode Ten	Sarah Daniels	Adrian Bean	22 February 1996
Mr. Parrott's late night casino visits are taking their toll on both his finances and his appearance. The Anti-bullying counselling starts and Lauren's first customer is Poppy.
11	Episode Eleven	Kevin Hood	Adrian Bean	27 February 1996
Mr. Parrott's careless comment affects Julie's self-esteem. "Bring Your Daughter to Work Day" takes place: Jodie has a disappointing day. Rehearsals for Grease start, and Mme. Lefevre's daughter Cecile makes an impact.
12	Episode Twelve	Kevin Hood	Adrian Bean	29 February 1996
Robyn's spends the evening at a casino and then spends the night on Mr. Parrott's sofa bed. Chris talks to his parents about his religious doubts, but Anna makes a surprise visit.
13	Episode Thirteen	Diane Whitley	Steven Andrew	5 March 1996
Miss Carver's class create an audio book, Robyn can't understand why Mr. Parrott has gone so cold, Christophe makes a sudden departure to Paris and Gabriel lets Cecile sing in the musical.
14	Episode Fourteen	Diane Whitley	Steven Andrew	7 March 1996
Christophe handles Miss Carver's detention class badly. Chris plans to escape his baptism by leaving home. He tells Anna he's going on a trip, and she surprises him by appearing at the coach station.
15	Episode Fifteen	Diane Whitley	Steven Andrew	12 March 1996
Chris and Anna head up to the Highlands but get lost when they get off the coach. A local woman rescues them, but they aren't the only people from Grange Hill in the area - Miss Carver is spending a holiday there.
16	Episode Sixteen	Diane Whitley	Steven Andrew	14 March 1996
Robyn calls at Mr. Parrott's house, but he's in no fit state for a tutorial. The net closes in on Chris and Anna, and they finally arrive at Chris's grandmother.
17	Episode Seventeen	Sarah Daniels	Philippa Langdale	19 March 1996
Mr. Parrott goes missing, and Robyn visits his flat, fearing for his safety. At the same time, his letter of resignation has landed on Mr. Robson's desk.
18	Episode Eighteen	Sarah Daniels	Philippa Landale	21 March 1996
The Sixth Formers visit the Hologram Laboratory where Christophe kisses Julie. After writing nothing in the history exam, Josh walks down the corridor and then collapses.
19	Episode Nineteen	Judith Johnson	Philippa Langdale	26 March 1996
Dudley's caught putting graffiti on the school wall, Denny sells advertising for the Grease production, and when Lucy has a roller blading accident, the unpopular Cecile steps forward to replace her.
20	Episode Twenty	Judith Johnson	Philippa Langdale	28 March 1996
There's a surprise for Robyn as Mr. Parrott returns to school. While the Grease show is performed, Mrs. Maguire's baby is delivered by Dennis and Lucy in the loos.

== DVD release ==
The nineteenth series of Grange Hill has never been released on DVD as of 2024.
