= Grange Hill series 18 =

Grange Hill
- Season 18
- No. of episodes: 20

Release
- Original network: BBC One
- Original release: 3 January – 10 March 1995

Season chronology
- ← Previous; Series 17 Next → Series 19

The eighteenth series of the British television drama series Grange Hill began broadcasting on 3 January 1995, before ending on 10 March 1995 on BBC One. The series follows the lives of the staff and Students of the eponymous school, an inner-city London comprehensive school. It consists of twenty episodes.

== Cast ==
=== Students ===
- Jamie Lehane as Russell "Jacko" Morgan
- Natalie Poyser as Becky Stevens
- Margo Selby as Julie Corrigan
- Ian Steele as Brian Shaw
- Nina Fry as Robyn Stone
- Darren Kempson as Gabriel Woods
- Abigail Hart as Paula Webster
- Martino Lazzeri as Joe Williams
- Rochelle Gadd as Delia "Dill" Lodge
- Lisa Hammond as Denny Roberts
- Nicholas Pinnock as Jerome Cairns
- Stephanie Charles as Liz
- Alan Cave as Dennis Morris
- Melanie Joseph as Lauren Phillips
- Belinda Crane as Lucy Mitchell
- Steven Hammett as Dudley Wesker
- Natalie Tapper as Jodie Abedayo
- Francesca Martinez as Rachel Burns
- Amy Phillips as Jessica Arnold
- Jamie Groves as Josh Davies
- Anna Aidoo as Felicity
- Aidan J. David as James "Arnie" Arnold
- Colin Ridgewell as Colin Brown
- Jenny Long as Anna Wright
- Kevin Bishop as Sam Spalding
- Simon Long as Rick Underwood
- Peter Morton as Wayne Sutcliffe
- Kate Bell as Kelly Bradshaw
- Laura Hammett as Sarah-Jane Webster
- George Starke as Kevin Jenkins
- Ayesha Antoine as Poppy Silver

=== Teachers ===
- Stuart Organ as Mr Peter Robson
- Lee Cornes as Mr Jeff Hankin
- Adam Ray as Mr Tom Brisley
- Peter Leeper as Mr Malcolm Parrott
- Paul Bigley as Mr Dave Greenman
- Karen O'Brien as Mrs Siobhan Maguire
- Sally Geoghegan as Miss Jayne Carver
- Nigel Miles-Thomas as Mr Davies
- Theresa Watson as Dorothy
- Suzanne Packer as Miss Foster

=== Others ===
- Andrew Henry as Gordon
- Chris Jarman as Carl
- Madelaine Newton as Mrs Pamela Jenkins
- Sharon Bower as Mrs Morris
- Sonia Fraser as Dinner Lady
- Charlotte Douglas as Kimberley Webster
- Daniel O'Grady as Con
- Amelda Brown as Mrs Wendy Wright
- Fiona Bruce as Driving School Receptionist
- Adam Richardson as Billy
- Alastair Cumming as Si
- Adam Caine as Gorilla Gram
- Richard Avery as Loan Shark
- Edward Holmes as Richard Farley
- Neville Robinson, Robert Joseph and Fuman Dejahang as Andrew's Friends
- Roger McLenahan as Eliot
- Rachel Laurence as Educational Welfare Officer/Ms Hunt
- John Dallimore as Norman
- Mark Trotman as Casey
- Teohna Williams as Madeline Shaw
- Andrew Loudon as Adam McLaren
- Eve Bland as Marian
- Maria Warner as Mrs Lodge
- Judy Gordon as Waitress
- Howard Sadler as DC Chambers
- Emily Staveley-Taylor as Emily
- Candida Gubbins as Roz
- David Quilter as Mr Jim Arnold
- John Sandford as Postman
- Zara Nutley as Eve
- Alex Lowe as Simon
- John Telfer as Mr Williams
- Martin O'Brien as Tom Wilkins
- Fiona McCade as English TV Interviewer
- Nigel Greenhalgh as Spanish TV Interviewer
- Timothy Bentinck as Mr Greg Mitchell
- Jay Jiggins as Dawn
- Jean Ainslie as Edna
- Ryan Johns as Danny
- Dean Saunders as Mark
- Arthur White as Mr Maxwell
- Thea Bennett as Thea
- Bob Fletcher as Bob
- Geoff Martin as Dean
- Laurence Helgesen as Gary
- Paul Regan as John
- Lyndsey Cook as Alicia
- Ross Sando as Alex
- Dorcas Morgan as Dr West
- Michael Brogan as Paramedic
- David Charles, Jim North and Lisa Rose as Museum Explainers
- Jake Curran as Mick
- Freddy White as Hard Scout
- Paul Brady as Hard Scout Sidekick
- Aaron Swartz as Astronaut
- Barbara Phelps as Dr Firth
- Glen Berry as Harry
- Natasha Bain as Kate
- Richard Ashton as Aids Counsellor
- Tony Millan as Mr Morris
- Susannah Bray as Mrs Morris
- Suzanne Sinclair as Mrs Alderson
- Petina Hapgood as Mrs Richardson
- Tony Spooner as Doctor
- Simon Sherlock as Tyre Fitter
- Joe Grossi as Graham
- Jonathan Evans as Head of St Joseph's
- Helena Ball as St Joseph's Pupil

== Episodes ==
No.	Episode	Writer	Director	Original airdate
1	Episode One	Diane Whitley	Nigel Douglas	3 January 1995
On Induction Day there are some new faces. Sarah-Jane's little sister goes rampant, a new house system is introduced, and there's trouble brewing in the canteen.
2	Episode Two	Diane Whitley	Nigel Douglas	6 January 1995
Anna's brother gets her to drum up business for his drug selling. Julie takes driving lessons, but it's Robyn who the instructor is interested in.
3	Episode Three	Diane Whitley	Nigel Douglas	10 January 1995
The house system is reorganized. There's a gorillagram in school, but it is both Poppy and Mrs. Maguire's birthday.
4	Episode Four	Diane Whitley	Nigel Douglas	13 January 1995
When a policeman comes to school to talk about drugs, Anna hides the LSD tabs. Looking for Gordon, the loan shark smashes up the flat. Anna heads out onto the streets alone.
5	Episode Five	Judith Johnson	David Bell	17 January 1995
Paula makes a fool of herself trying to impress Jerome. Dennis adopts the Beatnik look for a trip to an art museum, but when he sees that Rachel needs to sit down, he grabs a nearby chair and destroys the exhibit from which it is a part!
6	Episode Six	Judith Johnson	David Bell	20 January 1995
Julie camps out in the playing fields. Arnie and Dill find someone living in the Boiler Room. Kevin unwittingly takes one of Anna's LSD tabs. Later, he starts to be affected, runs out of class and climbs over the balcony...
7	Episode Seven	Chris Ellis	David Bell	24 January 1995
Rachel calmly talks Kevin away from danger, Miss Carver moves in with Mrs. Maguire and Becky goes to see how a women's refuge operates.
8	Episode Eight	Chris Ellis	David Bell	27 January 1995
Becky's involvement with the women's refuge threatens her relationship with Jacko. Arnie and Dill eavesdrop on Gordon on his mother and discover disturbing news about Anna.
9	Episode Nine	Ol Parker	Steven Andrew	31 January 1995
The school holds a fund raising day. Arnie and Sam's hatch a plan to kidnap Mr. Parrott (but all for a good cause!) while Jessica settles her differences with Paula in the girls' rugby match.
10	Episode Ten	Ol Parker	Steven Andrew	3 February 1995
Anna seeks revenge for her brother being shopped. Julie joins the "tribe" of protesters and Jessica goes go-karting with Joe.
11	Episode Eleven	Sarah Daniels	Steven Andrew	7 February 1995
Gordon tracks down his mother and sister at the refuge, Lucy and Josh develop a fact sheet about the area and Dudley falls in love.
12	Episode Twelve	Sarah Daniels	Steven Andrew	10 February 1995
Gordon hits Becky as she tries to rescue Anna, but he's caught by the police. Demolition equipment sets to work on the road protesters' house, while inside Julie and her friends are handcuffed together.
13	Episode Thirteen	Kevin Hood	Nigel Douglas	14 February 1995
The lonely hearts comes to an abrupt end when the two "Sexy Sadies" get mixed up assignments. An HIV awareness workshop is held.
14	Episode Fourteen	Kevin Hood	Nigel Douglas	17 February 1995
Year seven spends the night at the Science Museum, while Lucy's mother is taken to hospital with suspected Meningitis.
15	Episode Fifteen	Kevin Hood	Nigel Douglas	21 February 1995
Lucy's mother dies of an HIV related disease. Her father works out the disease was contracted during a transfusion while abroad. At school, sympathy turns into vicious rumour.
16	Episode Sixteen	Kevin Hood	Nigel Douglas	24 February 1995
There's a lot of ignorance demonstrated when people learn that Lucy's mother had HIV. A visit to the Terrence Higgins Trust helps clear up her thoughts.
17	Episode Seventeen	Alison Fisher	David Bell	28 February 1995
At half term, Gabriel and Brian leave a raunchy video in a coach they are cleaning, and when the coach unexpectedly departs, courier-biker Jacko tries to intercept it before the Women's Institute press "play" on the remote control.
18	Episode Eighteen	Alison Fisher	David Bell	3 March 1995
Lucy and her father get the rest results they hoped for, and a parents' evening is held.
19	Episode Nineteen	Alison Fisher	David Bell	7 March 1995
The school works on a promo video and Rick persuades a shop to give him a bicycle in return for "product placement" in the video. Jacko tells Becky he doesn't have the money to go on holiday with her.
20	Episode Twenty	Alison Fisher	David Bell	10 March 1995
The two videos are finalised, Poppy gets revenge on Wayne, and Jacko has a surprise present for Becky's birthday.

== DVD release ==
The eighteenth series of Grange Hill has never been released on DVD as of 2015.
