= Grange Hill series 17 =

Grange Hill
- Season 17
- No. of episodes: 20

Release
- Original network: BBC One
- Original release: 4 January – 11 March 1994

Season chronology
- ← Previous; Series 16 Next → Series 18

The seventeenth series of the British television drama series Grange Hill began broadcasting on 4 January 1994, before ending on 11 March 1994 on BBC One. The series follows the lives of the staff and Students of the eponymous school, an inner-city London comprehensive school. It consists of twenty episodes.

== Cast ==
=== Students ===
- Rachel Victoria Roberts as Justine Dean
- Desmond Askew as Richard
- Luisa Bradshaw-White as Maria Watts
- Jamie Lehane as Russell "Jacko" Morgan
- Natalie Poyser as Becky Stevens
- Margo Selby as Julie Corrigan
- Ian Steele as Brian Shaw
- Nina Fry as Robyn Stone
- Darren Kempson as Gabriel
- Abigail Hart as Paula Webster
- Martino Lazzeri as Joe Williams
- Lisa Hammond as Denny
- Alan Cave as Dennis Morris
- Melanie Joseph as Lauren Phillips
- Belinda Crane as Lucy Mitchell
- Steven Hammett as Dudley Wesker
- Natalie Tapper as Jodie Abedayo
- Francesca Martinez as Rachel Burns
- Amy Phillips as Jessica Arnold
- Jamie Groves as Josh Davies
- Aidan J. David as James "Arnie" Arnold
- Colin Ridgewell as Colin Brown
- Jenny Long as Anna Wright
- Kevin Bishop as Sam Spalding
- Lucie Carey as Hammy
- Rochelle Gadd as Delia "Dill" Lodge

=== Teachers ===
- Stuart Organ as Mr Peter Robson
- Lee Cornes as Mr Jeff Hankin
- Jenny Howe as Mrs Angela Keele
- Adam Ray as Mr Tom Brisley
- Peter Leeper as Mr Malcolm Parrott
- Paul Bigley as Mr Dave Greenman
- Anna Quayle as Mrs Monroe
- Karen O'Brien as Mrs Siobhan Maguire
- Dena Davis as Miss Martha Jordan
- Hakim Kae Kazim as Mr Manyeke

=== Others ===
- Jim Barclay as Mr Morgan
- Sally Watts as Mrs Morgan
- Gavin Wilkinson as Gizzard
- Andrea Gibb as Marian
- Sophie Diaz as Airport Cleaner
- Ann-Marie Gwatkin & Oona Kirsh as Girls In Toilet
- Julie Anne Blyth as Information Officer
- Cheryl Hall as Mrs Catesby
- Shaheen Khan as Grace
- Sam Clifton as Craig
- Ron-Li Paz as Scott
- Dicken Ashworth as Animal Man/Vernon
- Amanda-Jane Manning as Hilary
- Tara Costello as Zoe
- Claire Toeman as Taxi Driver
- Harriet Robinson as Gaydi
- Robin Brown as Paul
- Dougal Davis as Duane
- Danny Codicek as Terry
- David Quilter as Mr Jim Arnold
- Daryl Webster as Mrs Arnold
- Bill Cashmore as Political Campaigner
- Nicola Gladwin as Karen
- Margery Withers as Vernon's mother
- Frank Mills as Ron
- Linsey Beauchamp as Ms Stockton
- Sarah Burghard as Jackie
- Madalaine Moffatt as Old Lady
- Anthony Askew as Stabbed Man
- John Arthur as Mr Watts
- Tom Knight as Policeman
- Roy Heather as Parks Keeper
- Jillie Meers as Brownie Leader
- Peter Forbes as Mr Taylor
- Helen Blizard as Mrs Taylor
- Lois Butlin as Mrs Stone
- Steve Swinscoe as Workman
- Dennis Titus as Finch
- Nick Pickard as Mark
- Jolyon Stephenson as Drunk
- Elisabeth Stainer as Rosa
- Metin Yenal as Dieter
- Steffan Boje as Hans
- Carlos Wagner as Republika Leute Leader
- Ben Stockman as Uli
- Ania Grudzinska as Katya
- Hans-Peter Struppe as Border Guard
- Katryna Thomas-Shell as Choir Soloist
- Hannah Billington, Gemma Golding & Oliver Mardling as Choir Members
- Choir from Annengymnasium Görlitz

== Episodes ==
No.	Episode	Writer	Director	Original airdate
1	Episode One	Sarah Daniels	Vivienne Cozens	4 January 1994
Justine goes with Mr. Robson to meet a new American teacher, Martha Jordan, at the airport. Mrs. Keele gets rid of her credit card but Anna Wright puts the pieces back together.
2	Episode Two	Sarah Daniels	Vivienne Cozens	7 January 1994
Anna gets to have some fun with Mrs. Keele's credit card. Jacko tells Becky about his mother's condition, and that it has got worse
3	Episode Three	Sarah Daniels	Vivienne Cozens	11 January 1994
Mr. Robson finds his romantic aspirations taking a slight knock back at Martha's Thanksgiving dinner. Mrs. Monroe is locked in the school toilets by Anna. Jacko wants to take his mother to the seaside.
4	Episode Four	Sarah Daniels	Vivienne Cozens	14 January 1994
A car boot sale, football trials and a drama workshop are held at the school on a Sunday. Jacko sells some of his things. Arnie and Sam learn about a suspicious trade taking place in animals.
5	Episode Five	Ol Parker	Nigel Douglas	18 January 1994
Arnie and Sam's investigation into the animal sellers end up seeing them getting into some trouble. There is romance between Martha and Mr. Robson.: Note: First appearance of Abigail Hart as Paula Webster
6	Episode Six	Ol Parker	Nigel Douglas	21 January 1994
When Jacko takes his mum on a trip to the seaside, he ends up learning some family history. Mr. Robson nearly ruins his budding romance with Martha.
7	Episode Seven	Diane Whitley	Nigel Douglas	25 January 1994
Anna finds herself becoming involved in the "Animal Man" business. News about Martha and Mr. Robson spreads.
8	Episode Eight	Diane Whitley	Nigel Douglas	28 January 1994
Jessica ends up being attacked by Paula because of the rumour that Joe groped her. Mr. Robson and Martha attempt to discover the truth about what happened. Mrs. Keele collapses during a confrontation with Anna.
9	Episode Nine	Chris Ellis	Christine Secombe	1 February 1994
Mrs. Keele is in hospital recovering from her heart attack. Mr Parrott's maths test is photocopied by Dennis. Jacko spends more time with his mother but ends up losing his place in the band as a result.
10	Episode Ten	Chris Ellis	Christine Secombe	4 February 1994
Work begins on a school brochure as different pictures are taken around the school. Arnie, Sam and Anna end up using camera to get more clues about the animal smuggling.
11	Episode Eleven	Chris Ellis	Christine Secombe	8 February 1994
Mr. Robson receives some worrying news from the school inspectors. Arnie, Sam and Anna travel to Hertford and find Animal Man's farm. When Anna sees a puppy about to be drowned she makes her presence known.
12	Episode Twelve	Chris Ellis	Christine Secombe	11 February 1994
Arnie, Sam and Anna manage to beat the animal trader. After Mrs. Monroe sees the girls perform "Bits and Pieces" she decides it's too risqué to be seen in public.
13	Episode Thirteen	Alison Fisher	Vivienne Cozens	15 February 1994
The stage equipment being used for the girls' play is accidentally damage by Dudley and Dennis. When Justine goes to a party she ends up witnessing an attack on the way home.
14	Episode Fourteen	Alison Fisher	Vivienne Cozens	18 February 1994
The girls ends up coming up with way to get around Mrs. Monroe's ban when they perform their drama piece in the local park.
15	Episode Fifteen	Alison Fisher	Vivienne Cozens	22 February 1994
Sam can't find a location for the computer tennis tournament to be played at. Dennis ends up admitting that it was Brian who assaulted Jessica. Robyn and Julie's second attempt at babysitting is no better than their first effort.
16	Episode Sixteen	Alison Fisher	Vivienne Cozens	25 February 1994
Anna finds herself being forced to join the school choir and her talent ends up surprising everyone. A trip to East Germany is planned by the school.
17	Episode Seventeen	Kevin Hood	Nigel Douglas	1 March 1994
The year seven Students put pressure on Mr. Parrott's failing voice so that he will be forced to quit the choir. Justine and Maria record Martha's singing in secret and play it to the music teacher so that she will be able go to Germany on the school trip with Mr. Robson.
18	Episode Eighteen	Kevin Hood	Nigel Douglas	4 March 1994
Sam ends up winning the computer game tournament but his winnings are confiscated by Mr. Robson. Maria spends the night with a man she met at a party. Maria later has a massive row with her father and Richard.
19	Episode Nineteen	Kevin Hood	Nigel Douglas	8 March 1994
The school choir travels to Germany for competition. A trip to a youth club ends up being an unpleasant experience. Jodie has to deal with youths who resent the intrusion of the English. Jessica ends up getting drunk.
20	Episode Twenty	Kevin Hood	Nigel Douglas	11 March 1994
Josh's war memorabilia could cause an explosive end to the trip. Martha decides that she can't give up on her life in America. Justine and Maria say goodbye to Grange Hill for good.

== DVD release ==
The seventeenth series of Grange Hill has never been released on DVD as of 2024.
