= Bill Cashmore =

Bill Cashmore may refer to:

- Bill Cashmore (actor) (1961–2017), English actor and playwright, political candidate
- Bill Cashmore (politician), New Zealand local government politician
