= Knight School =

Knight School can refer to:

- Knight School (UK TV series), a 1997 British children's television series
- Knight School (U.S. TV series), a 2006 American reality television series about basketball
- Corps of Cadets (Warsaw), a school that existed in the former Polish-Lithuanian Commonwealth
