= Out There (2025 TV series) =

British television series

- Genre: Drama
- Screenplay by: Ed Whitmore; Marc Evans
- Directed by: Marc Evans; Phillipa Langdale
- Starring: Martin Clunes; Louis Ashbourne Serkis; Michael Obiora
- Composer: Patrick Jonsson
- Country of origin: United Kingdom
- Original language: English
- No. of series: 1
- No. of episodes: 6

Production
- Executive producers: Marc Evans; Ed Whitmore
- Producers: Philippa Braithwaite; Evie Bergson-Korn
- Running time: 47 minutes
- Production company: Buffalo Pictures

Original release
- Network: ITV
- Release: 19 January – 3 February 2025

Out There is a 2025 six-part ITV drama series starring Martin Clunes and Louis Ashbourne Serkis as a Welsh father and son who get involved with the drug trade. It ran for one series from 19 January 2025.

== Synopsis ==
A farmer's schoolboy son, Johnny, is drawn in to helping a local drug dealer, Rhys. In defence of the dealer's sister, Sadie, he kills the supplier, Kenny, who had been trying to rape her. Johnny calls his father, Nathan, for help, and Nathan calls his brother, Caleb, to help remove the body. Meanwhile, Nathan's farm ownership and that of his elderly neighbours is subject to bidding by wealthy third-party investors. These may be a cover for large industrial companies who want to expand their operations.

When Turuk, the top man in the drugs' line, comes after those who killed Kenny, Nathan offers him use of the farm and his neighbour's eggs' retail business as camouflage for his drugs' warehousing and distribution. Meanwhile, Jane Crowther, a local policewoman, suspects Nathan of being involved in Kenny's death. A Polish cleaner, Eva (who minds the chickens), becomes involved with the drug shipments to help Nathan and Johnny.

== Cast ==
- Martin Clunes as Nathan Williams
- Louis Ashbourne Serkis as Johnny Williams
- Mark Lewis Jones as Caleb Williams
- Natalia Kostrzewa as Eva Bartosz
- Carly-Sophia Davies as Sadie Simpson
- Gerran Howell as Rhys Simpson
- Michael Obiora as Scott Foley
- Eiry Thomas as PC Jane Crowther
- Jack Parry-Jones as DCI Neil Anderson
- Michael Elwyn as Owen Thomas
- Sharon Morgan as Gwen Thomas
- Marcin Zarzeczny as Pavel
- Silas Carson as Ersin Turuk
- Cat Simmons as Robyn

== Production ==
The series was announced for ITV in September 2023, from writer and director duo Ed Whitmore and Marc Evans. Philippa Langdale also directed episodes. Production came from Buffalo Pictures, and the producers were Philippa Braithwaite and Evie Bergson-Korn.

Martin Clunes led the cast and was joined by Louis Ashbourne Serkis, Michael Obiora, Mark Lewis Jones, Natalia Kostrzewa, Carly-Sophia Davies and Gerran Howell.

Filming took place in Wales in late 2023. Filming locations included Newport, Llandovery, and the Black Mountains.

In May 2025, ITV confirmed the series would not return for a second season.

== Broadcast ==
The series was first broadcast on ITV on 19 January 2025.
