= Kathy Kiera Clarke =

Northern Irish actress

- Born: Belfast, Northern Ireland
- Occupation: Actress
- Years active: 1993–present

Kathy Kiera Clarke (possibly Keira) is a Northern Irish actress. She is best known for her role as Aunt Sarah in Derry Girls.

== Career ==
=== Film and television ===
In 1993, Clarke featured prominently in the music video "For Tomorrow" for the British band Blur.

Clarke's first television role was as Bernadette Brennan in Head over Heels in 1993. In 1995, she appeared in an episode of Chandler & Co as Poppy Farquhar. She appeared as Rosemary in the 1996 film Eskimo Day.

In 2000, she played Rosie in the film The Most Fertile Man in Ireland and a production assistant in the film Wild About Harry. She also played Anna Le Page in the television series, Take a Girl Like You. In 2002, Clarke played Frances in Bloody Sunday. In 2003, she played Nicola Blyth in the film Solid Air.

In 2004, Clarke appeared as Una in the comedy series Pulling Moves. She played Elizabeth Gibson in the film Omagh and played Jenifer Gaghan in two episodes of Silent Witness. In 2005, she played Sinead in four episodes of Proof. In 2006, she played Agnes in the film Small Engine Repair. In 2009, she played Emma in the film Cherrybomb.

In 2013, she played Marlene Riley in The Ice Cream Girls. In 2017, she played Varvara in the film Bitter Harvest. From 2018 to 2022, Clarke played the role of Aunt Sarah in the Channel 4 sitcom Derry Girls written by Lisa McGee.

In 2020, Clarke played the role of Sybil Stamfordis in the BBC One miniseries, The Pale Horse. Ann Donahue, writing for IndieWire, said that Clark's "portrayal of witch Sybil is a fun triple-take-inducing switch from her work as the ditzy aunt on Derry Girls."

In 2021, Clarke played the role of Claire Keenan in Bloodlands.

=== Stage ===
Clarke has also appeared on stage and has appeared in shows such as Brilliant Traces, Low Level Panic, The Coronation Voyage, Woman and Scarecrow, Scarborough, God of Carnage, Macbeth, Primecut, The Recruiting Office, Heartbreak House, Hamlet, Pentecost, Spokesong, The Bonefire, Dream of Autumn, Attempts on her Life, Don Carlos, Roberto Zucco, Shining City, Faith Healer, Lagan, Borders of Paradise, Torquato Tasso, Once a Catholic, The Factory Girls, Jekyll and Hyde, Riders to the Sea, Damaged Goods, Summit Conference, Medea, Stormont: a Farce and An Oak Tree.

== Filmography ==
Year	Title	Role	Notes
1993	Head over Heels	Bernadette Brennan	Series regular
1995	Chandler & Co	Anna Farquhar	1 episode "No Tomorrow"
1996	Eskimo Day	Rosemary	
1996	Hard Nut: A Love Story	Janet	Short film
2000	The Most Fertile Man in Ireland	Rosie	
2000	Wild About Harry	Production assistant	
2000	Take a Girl Like You	Anna Le Page	
2001	Last Legs		Short film
2002	Bloody Sunday	Frances	
2003	Solid Air	Nicola Blyth	
2004	Pulling Moves	Una	Series regular
2004	Omagh	Elizabeth Gibson	
2004	Silent Witness	Jenifer Gaghan	2 episodes
2005	Proof	Sinéad	4 episodes
2006	Small Engine Repair	Agnes	
2008	The Man Inside	Receptionist	Short film Voice role
2009	Cherrybomb	Emma	
2010	Dinner Party	Ashley	Short film
2011	Hold Your Breath	Woman	Short film
2013	The Ice Cream Girls	Marlene Riley	Miniseries
2017	Bitter Harvest	Varvara	
2018–2022	Derry Girls	Aunt Sarah	Main role
2020	The Pale Horse	Sybil Stamfordis	Miniseries
2020	A Bend in the River	Katie Hughes	
2021	Bloodlands	Claire Keenan	

== Personal life ==
Clarke lives near Hampstead Heath, Primrose Hill and Regent's Park. She is a fan of the Buddhist teacher Tara Brach.
