= Head over Heels (British TV series) =

- Genre: Comedy drama
- Created by: Jane Prowse
- Written by: Jane Prowse
- Starring: Ann Bell; Sally Geoghegan; Kathy Kiera Clarke; Elena Ferrari
- Composer: Stanley Myers
- Country of origin: United Kingdom
- Original language: English
- No. of series: 1
- No. of episodes: 7

Production
- Producer: Brian Eastman
- Production locations: London, England, UK
- Editor: Chris Blunden
- Running time: 52 minutes
- Production companies: Carnival Film and Television; Carlton Television

Original release
- Network: ITV
- Release: 11 January – 22 February 1993

Head over Heels is a British television comedy-drama programme lasting one series, which was broadcast on ITV from 11 January to 22 February 1993. It starred Ann Bell as Gracie Ellis, Sally Geoghegan as Catherine Ellis, Kathy Kiera Clarke as Bernadette Brennan and Elena Ferrari as Patsy Willoughby. The programme was produced at the Pinewood Studios.

== Premise ==
The series is a period comedy drama set in the 1950s. It revolves around a group of girls finishing school.

== Cast ==
- Gracie Ellis – Ann Bell
- Catherine Ellis – Sally Geoghegan
- Bernadette Brennan – Kathy Kiera Clarke
- Patsy Willoughby – Elena Ferrari
- Heather Brook – Diana Morrison
- Camilla De La Mer – Jackie Morrison
- Jimmy Ellis – Ian Embleton
- Alice Willoughby – Jessica Lloyd
- Stella Dunn – Gemma Page
- Jack Ellis – Michael Thomas
- Daniel – Nick Haverson

== Episodes ==
All seven episodes were written by Jane Prowse.

No.	Title	Directed by	Original release date
1	"Hard Headed Woman"	Chris King	11 January 1993
2	"At the Hop"	Graham Theakston	18 January 1993
3	"Li'l Pink Dress"	Chris King	25 January 1993
4	"Roll Over Beethoven"	Chris King	1 February 1993
5	"The Great Pretender"	Graham Theakston	8 February 1993
6	"Problem Child"	Graham Theakston	15 February 1993
7	"Secret Love"	Chris King	22 February 1993

== Broadcast ==
The film was broadcast in Italy as Camilla e le altre.

== Reception ==
The series has been called "a sugary slice of rock 'n' roll schoolgirl nonsense crammed with careless anachronisms"
