= Cash (The Young Ones) =

- The Young Ones episode
- Episode no.: Series 2 Episode 2
- Directed by: Paul Jackson
- Written by: Ben Elton, Rik Mayall and Lise Mayer
- Original air date: 15 May 1984
- Running time: 33:59

Guest appearances
- With Mark Arden, Paul Bradley, Lee Cornes, Steve Dixon, Stephen Frost, Steve Kelly, Jan Prince, Kay Stoneham, Andy de la Tour and Alan Freeman. Featuring "Ken Bishop's Nice Twelve" Peter Brewis, Simon Brint, Stewart Copeland, Chris Difford, Martin Dobson, Derek Griffiths, Jools Holland, Rowland Rivron

Episode chronology
← Previous "Bambi"	Next → "Nasty"

"Cash" is the eighth episode of British sitcom The Young Ones. It was written by Ben Elton, Rik Mayall and Lise Mayer, and directed by Paul Jackson. It was first broadcast on BBC2 on 15 May 1984. This particular episode is unusual in that it is filmed to enable the wall with the fireplace, which would usually be 'behind camera,' to be in view during internal scenes. In this case, the wall with the living room window becomes the fourth wall.

== Plot ==
The quartet are so poor that they are burning their clothes and belongings just to keep warm. Neil prepares meals of snow passed off as risotto, and Vyvyan goes around the neighbourhood to find winter fuel although the episode is set in September. Eventually they decide that someone needs to get a job to bring money into the house, but when the only vacancy advertised in the local paper is for the Army, Rick and Mike both rule themselves out on medical grounds (perforated eardrum and flat feet, respectively), while Vyvyan declares that he is pregnant, leaving Neil the only one to take the job.

After a poor haircut and a quick loan of Mike's suit, Neil goes to join up, but having been told not to mention it, is rejected for being a pacifist. After spotting a recruitment poster for the police, the other three throw Neil into the police station next door, where he meets Alexei Sayle's character, a Mussolini-lookalike. While the others get lucky when a lorry full of food and expensive furnishings crashes through the front window, Neil takes to his new job – arresting a bunch of his drugged-up hippie friends, where the track Electrick Gypsies by Steve Hillage is playing on the record player until he pulls the plug on it and says – "Oh no, Steve Hillage!"

Arriving home, Neil tries to arrest his flatmates, assuming they have stolen the luxury items. His harsh use of the baton forces Vyvyan into labour. Mike leaves the room, being afraid of the sight of childbirth. Instead, Vyvyan actually ends up passing wind loudly. Having been handcuffed together with Vyvyan, Rick and Neil frantically try to escape the smell but Neil is unable to find the keys to the handcuffs. Mike returns and lights a celebratory cigar, unaware of what has just happened; the flame ignites the gas and causes an explosion which destroys the house with all the luxury furniture and money.

== Characters ==
As with all episodes of The Young Ones, the main four characters were student housemates Mike (Christopher Ryan); Vyvyan (Adrian Edmondson); Rick (Rik Mayall) and Neil (Nigel Planer). Alexei Sayle appears as a Benito Mussolini cabaret act and police recruitment officer. DJ Alan Freeman plays God, sitting at a radio mixing desk, on the first of two occasions in the series.

== Reception ==
Peter Lee said this episode is "deliciously mad".
