= The Pale Horse (TV series) =

2020 UK television series

- Genre: Mystery; Drama; Thriller
- Based on: The Pale Horse by Agatha Christie
- Written by: Sarah Phelps
- Directed by: Leonora Lonsdale
- Starring: Rufus Sewell; Sheila Atim; Georgina Campbell; Bertie Carvel; Kathy Kiera Clarke; James Fleet; Henry Lloyd-Hughes; Claire Skinner; Rita Tushingham; Sean Pertwee; Kaya Scodelario
- Composer: Anne Nikitin
- Country of origin: United Kingdom
- Original language: English
- No. of series: 1
- No. of episodes: 2

Production
- Executive producers: Basi Akpabio; Tommy Bulfin; Sarah Phelps; James Prichard; Damien Timmer; Helen Ziegler
- Cinematography: Jarin Blaschke
- Production companies: Mammoth Screen; Agatha Christie Productions

Original release
- Release: 9 February – 16 February 2020

The Pale Horse is a 2020 British television two-part mystery drama series. Written by Sarah Phelps, it is loosely based on Agatha Christie's novel of the same name. It is Phelps' fifth adaptation of a Christie work for the BBC. Directed by Leonora Lonsdale, the series stars Rufus Sewell and Kaya Scodelario.

== Cast ==
=== Main ===
- Rufus Sewell as Mark Easterbrook
- Sheila Atim as Thyrza Grey
- Georgina Campbell as Delphine Easterbrook
- Bertie Carvel as Zachariah Osborne
- Kathy Kiera Clarke as Sybil Stamfordis
- James Fleet as Oscar Venables
- Henry Lloyd-Hughes as David Ardingly
- Claire Skinner as Yvonne Tuckerton
- Rita Tushingham as Bella
- Sean Pertwee as Inspector Stanley Lejeune
- Kaya Scodelario as Hermia Easterbrook

=== Supporting ===
- Madeleine Bowyer as Jessie Davis
- Poppy Gilbert as Thomasina Tuckerton
- Ellen Robertson as Poppy
- Sarah Woodward as Clemency Ardingly

== Production ==
Filming took place in Bristol. The car driven by Rufus Sewell's character is a Lagonda 3-Litre drophead coupé.

== Episodes ==
No.	Episode	Directed by	Written by	Original release date	UK viewers (millions)
1	Episode 1	Leonora Lonsdale	Sarah Phelps	9 February 2020	7.00
A year after his first wife, Delphine, was electrocuted in the bath, antique dealer Mark Easterbrook is visited by the police when a woman, Jessie Davis, is found dead in the street. Hidden in her shoe is piece of paper bearing a list of names including Mark's and that of his paramour, Thomasina Tuckerton, who Mark later finds dead in bed. Her hair had started to fall out, a symptom she shared with Jessie Davis. Mark struggles with the relationship with his new wife, Hermia, who correctly suspects him of philandering. Mark discovers that both Delphine and Jessie had visited the village of Much Deeping to consult a trio of fortune-telling women living there. Shopkeeper Zachariah Osborne, whose name also appears on the list and who was Jessie Davis's former employer, tells Mark that the women are witches who are responsible for the deaths.
2	Episode 2	Leonora Lonsdale	Sarah Phelps	16 February 2020	5.74
Mark's hair begins to fall out. He has nightmares, suspects that Hermia is plotting against him, and succumbs to a growing paranoia towards the witches and their supposed power. Mark's godson, David Ardingly, admits to having enlisted the witches to kill his Aunt Clemency in order to bring forward his inheritance. Inspector Lejeune disputes Mark's version of Delphine's death, and makes it clear that Mark is a suspect. Mark visits the witches and pays handsomly to have them remove the threat be believes is posed by Hermia and Lejeune. Upon returning home, he finds Hermia collapsed and unresponsive; she is subsequently taken to hospital in a coma. While there, a poisoned Lejeune is also admitted. Mark's flashbacks reveal that he had caused Delphine's death by electrocution, and had covered it up. He confronts Osborne, who confesses to working with the witches: clients would pay for targeted killings, which Osborne carried out by posing as a workman, visiting the clients at home, and covertly administering thallium in the form of rat poison. Osborne taunts Mark, who kills him with a crowbar. Hermia wakes in hospital with the witches at her side, and the women tell her what Mark has done. Mark reads in the morning paper a report of his own death. Mark is now reliving Delphine's death over and over again in his nightmares.

== Reception ==
Rotten Tomatoes reports an approval rating of 80% based on 25 reviews, with an average rating of 6.71/10. The site's critics' consensus reads: "Though The Pale Horse bristles with brutal thrills, it's [sic] convoluted mystery at times sedates the suspenseful proceedings." Metacritic reports an aggregated score of 69 out of 100 based on 6 reviews, indicating "Generally favorable reviews".

The Guardian gave the first episode four stars and praised the writing and direction. The Independent deemed the second episode "satisfying" and said that the updates to the material and language worked. In their review of the second episode, The Telegraph was less complimentary, awarding three stars and saying "writer Sarah Phelps was chucking the rat-filled kitchen sink into this rewrite of Agatha Christie."

As with her previous adaptations, some viewers criticized the numerous and significant changes Phelps made to the original novel; and some criticized the ending, which they found confusing. A Radio Times feature admitted that "the ending is deliberately ambiguous".
