= Bill Cashmore (actor) =

British actor, playwright and director (1961–2017)

- Born: 17 April 1961; London, England
- Died: 9 November 2017 (aged 56)
- Occupations: Comedian; journalist; playwright; actor
- Years active: 1989–2017
- Website: billcashmore.co.uk

Bill Cashmore (17 April 1961 – 9 November 2017) was an English actor and playwright, as well as director and co-founder of the organisation Actors in Industry.

== Acting ==
Cashmore was born in Nottingham and attended Denstone College, Uttoxeter, and Downing College, Cambridge, where he read English. He started his acting career in the Cambridge Footlights and went on to have roles in The Bill, Casualty, All Creatures Great and Small, Fist of Fun, and other programmes.

== Writer and playwright ==
Cashmore was a writer and performer for Gimme 5, the live ITV children's programme. He has written several plays with Andy Powrie, including Trip of A Lifetime, published by Samuel French, which has been performed around the world.

Cashmore wrote the following full-length plays and pantomimes: What's in a name?, Amber, Trip of a Lifetime, Time Please, A Breed Apart, Amy is Four, Unaccommodated, Bride or Groom?, Seating Plan, New Year's Resolution.

Cashmore wrote three one-act plays: Past Lives, Daughter, and Him, Her and Them. He also performed in two one-man shows, An Everyday Actor and Bill's Clothes.

== Politics ==
In 2017, he was selected as the Green Party candidate for Chelsea and Fulham, where he stood for the parliament in the 2017 general election, finishing fourth with 1.9% of the vote.

== Death ==
Cashmore died on 9 November 2017, of a stroke, aged 56.

== Filmography ==
=== Television ===
Year	Title	Role	Notes
1989	All Creatures Great and Small	Freddie Trueman	Episode: "Big Fish, Little Fish"
1991	The Sharp End	Man in Pub	Episode: #1.7
1991	The Play on One	Phil	Episode: "Out of the Blue"
1992	Moon and Son	Kennedy	Episode: "Her Death Was So Sudden"
1992	Resnick	Michael Taylor	Episode: "Lonely Hearts: Part 1"
1993	Dancing Queen	Policeman	Television film
1994	Grange Hill	Political Campaigner	Episode: #17.8
1989–1994	The Bill	Various	3 episodes
1994	Screen One	Ches	Episode: "Meat"
1994	Knightmare	Various	9 episodes
1995	Kavanagh QC	DS Cadbury	Episode: "Nothing But the Truth"
1995	Live with the Goggles	TV Expert	Episode: #1.2
1995–1996	Fist of Fun	Various	8 episodes
1996	Men Behaving Badly	Workman	Episode: "The Good Pub Guide"
1996	Sharman	Barry	Episode: "Hearts of Stone"
1997	Brass Eye	Various	2 episodes
1997	Does China Exist?		Television film
1997	Wycliffe	Smith	Episode: "Dance of the Scorpions"
1993–1998	Casualty	Gordon Trevor	2 episodes
2017	The Magical Music Box	Various	3 episodes
