= Knight School (British TV series) =

- Created by: Mark Billingham; Peter Cocks
- Country of origin: United Kingdom
- Original language: English
- No. of series: 2
- No. of episodes: 13

Production
- Running time: 25 minutes
- Production company: Granada Television

Original release
- Network: ITV (CITV)
- Release: 2 September 1997 – 15 October 1998

Knight School is a comedy drama series shown on Children's ITV and made by Granada Television. It was written and created by Mark Billingham and Peter Cocks, who also starred in the series. Two series were broadcast between 2 September 1997 and 15 October 1998.

== Overview ==
Knight School was promoted by Granada Television as "Grange Hill meets Blackadder". Set in the Middle Ages, the action centred on St Cuthbert's Academy, an exclusive school for young knights. The story began with the school deciding to take a scholarship boy. The lucky boy, and the hero of the series, was Wally Scrope, a common but loveable village idiot. Over the course of the series, Scrope battles for the affections of Lady Elizabeth de Gossard (played by Grange Hill girl-next-door Amy Phillips), head girl of the nearby St Catherine's School for Damsels, and he has a rival for his affections in the form of St Cuthbert's head boy and school bully Sir Roger de Courcey.

Despite being set in the Middle Ages, there were many in-jokes to make Knight School relevant to a late 1990s audience. For one, the school was run by a progressive headmaster, Sir Hubert Grindcobbe, whose idea it was to take on a scholarship boy. His power-hungry deputy was the feared Sir Baldwin De'Ath, who longed for the top job, and made good use of De Courcey as his personal henchman. And in a bid to impress Lady Elizabeth, Wally gets her tickets to see her favourite boy band, "MinstrelZone". Unfortunately the tickets are fake, having been obtained from Wally's spiv cousin (pre-EastEnders Shane Richie), but they still get into the concert.

Knight School sent up the Spice Girls phenomenon in Series 2 by having Lady Elizabeth and Eunice kidnapped on the school holiday and forced to perform in a new girl band, "The Herb Girls".

Series 1 of Knight School was shot with a filmic effect and had impressive production values. Come the second series, new producer Yvon Grace brought several changes to the style of the show; the filmic effect was lost in favour of a standard VT look, the impressive male vocal theme song was superseded by a less impressive rendition played on kazoos. A couple of principal characters were recast. But there was also a guest appearance by EastEnders stalwart John Altman as evil wizard Wormwood, and comedian Ted Robbins as the DJ at the school's end-of-term "disco".

== Cast ==
=== Staff ===
- Peter Jeffrey – Sir Hubert Grindcobbe
- Roger Lloyd-Pack – Sir Baldwin de'Ath, also Ben D'Izir (Series 2)
- Joanna McCallum – Mistress Genevieve Gently
- Mark Billingham – Scrubbe
- Peter Cocks – Grockle
- Anne Orwin – Mrs Scabbe (Series 2)
- Ramsay Gilderdale – Jasper Crouchback
- Christopher Guard – Clovis Sackbutt (Series 1)
- Geoffrey Bayldon – Dr Spencer DePenser (Series 1)

=== Pupils ===
- Stuart Rooker – Wally Scrope
- Anthony Hamblin – Sir Arthur Melton-Mowbray
- Blake Ritson – Sir Roger de Courcey
- Amy Phillips – Lady Elizabeth de Gossard
- Susie Williams – Eunice Spongge-Baggeley (Series 1)
- Carly Hamilton – Eunice Spongge-Baggeley (Series 2)
- Robert Pollard – Alf Scrope (Series 2)
- Lucy Bell – Lady Amelia de Gossard (Series 2)
- Thomas Hudson – Wykeham (Series 2)
- Steven Townsley – Sir Montegue (Series 1&2)
