= Adam Sopp =

British actor (born 1986)

- Born: Adam Michael Richard Sopp; 27 August 1986 (age 40); Kent, England
- Education: Bristol Old Vic Theatre School
- Occupation: Actor
- Years active: 1998–present

Adam Michael Richard Sopp (born 27 August 1986) is a British actor. He is best known for his role as teenager Darren Clarke in the long-running BBC school drama Grange Hill from 1999 to 2002.

== Career ==
Sopp has also appeared in daytime soap opera Doctors. He provided the voice for Harry Potter in the Order of the Phoenix, Half-Blood Prince and Deathly Hallows – Part 1 and 2 video game adaptations, and for "Rickert of Vinheim" and "Vince of Thorolund" in the video game Dark Souls. He reprised the role of Harry Potter for additional dialogue in the Universal Studios ride Harry Potter and the Escape from Gringotts. In 2014, he played the role of Mick Avory in the musical Sunny Afternoon. In 2016, he returned to the Dark Souls video game series, voicing the male version of "Anri of Astora" in Dark Souls III.

== Personal life ==
After leaving Grange Hill, Sopp trained at the Bristol Old Vic Theatre School.

== Filmography ==
=== Film ===
Year	Title	Role	Notes
2011	Expectation Management	Roy	Short film

=== Television ===
Year	Title	Role	Notes
1999–2002	Grange Hill	Darren Clarke	
2003–2010	Doctors	David Moulding; Brian Emery; Tom Durlish	Episodes: "No Thugs in Our House" "Big Momma" "The Comeback Kid"
2005	Tom Brown's Schooldays	Voice-over	TV movie, uncredited
2008	Casualty 1907	Frank Gorman	TV miniseries
2008	Teenage Kicks	Student	Episode: "Student"
2010	Abroad	Youth	TV movie
2013	Holby City	Jason Sheehan	Episode: "The Waiting Game"
2013	WPC 56	Gerry Sullivan	Episodes: "Great Pretenders" & "Little Boy Lost"
2014	Father Brown	Archie Fernsley	Episode: "The Shadow of the Scaffold"
2014	The Lost Honour of Christoper Jeffries	Police Officer	Episode: "Part One"
2017	Stan Lee's Lucky Man	Croupier 2	Episode: "Luck Be a Lady"
2017	Casualty	Chris Torbitt	Episode #32.5

=== Video games ===
Year	Title	Role	Notes
2003	Harry Potter: Quidditch World Cup	Marcus Flint	
2004	Harry Potter and the Prisoner of Azkaban	Harry Potter	
2007	Harry Potter and the Order of the Phoenix	Harry Potter	
2009	Harry Potter and the Half-Blood Prince	Harry Potter	
2010	Harry Potter and the Deathly Hallows – Part 1	Harry Potter	
2011	Harry Potter and the Deathly Hallows – Part 2	Harry Potter	
2011	El Shaddai: Ascension of the Metatron	Raphael	
2011	Dark Souls	Rickert of Vinheim; Vince of Thorolund	
2012	Harry Potter for Kinect	Harry Potter	
2016	Dark Souls III	Anri of Astora (male)	
