= Michael Obiora =

British actor, author (born 1986)

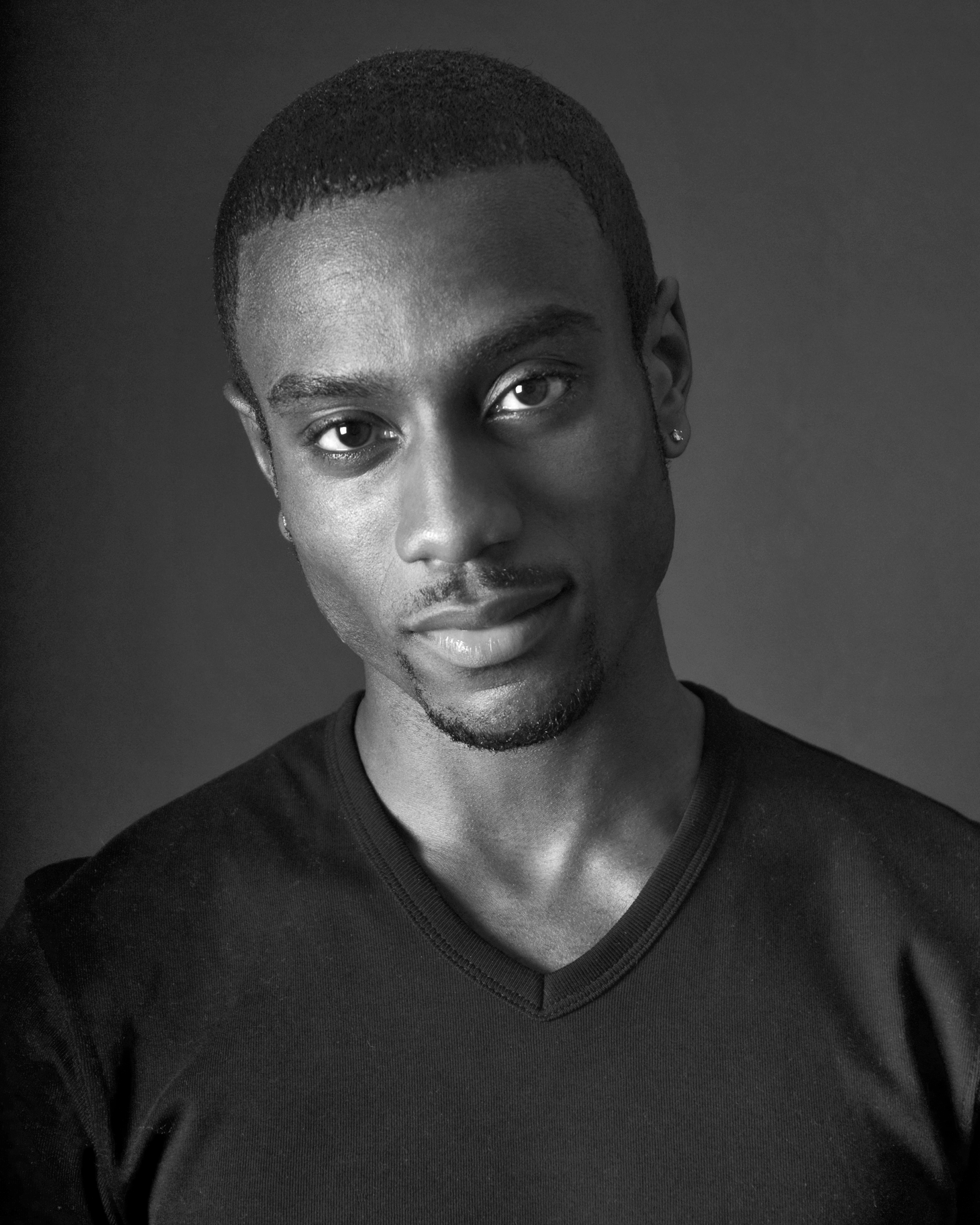
- Born: 8 October 1986 (age 40); Camden, London, England
- Occupations: Actor, Writer, Director, Producer
- Years active: 1996–present
- Children: 1

Michael Obiora // (born 8 October 1986) is a British actor, writer, director, and producer.

== Early life ==
Michael Obiora (pronounced OH-BEE-ORA) was born on 8 October 1986 in north-west London, England, to Nigerian-Igbo parents. As a six-year-old, he was determined to become an entertainer like his idol Michael Jackson, and his mother enrolled him in drama lessons. He describes having challenging teen years, as he was once badly injured, later expelled from secondary school before his GCSEs, and then his father died.

== Career ==
At the age of nine, Obiora became the youngest actor to have appeared in the children's television series Grange Hill; he played Max Abassi on the programme for five years.

Just before his 18th birthday, Obiora landed a role playing the part of Gunner Jackson Clarke, a soldier in ITV's eight-part series Bombshell. Shortly after filming that series, he started a seven-month run as one of the leads in the award-winning play Elmina's Kitchen, at the Garrick Theatre. He later had the lead role in the play Exclude Me, in an 11-week run at the Chelsea Theatre, and lead roles in the plays Fallout, at the Royal Court Theatre, Badnuff, at the Soho Theatre, and Headstone at the Arcola Theatre.

Obiora has had television roles in My Family, Judge John Deed, Misfits, Sea of Souls, Afterlife, and the acclaimed 2007 Doctor Who episode "Blink", He has also starred in Doctors, Powers, The Bill for five episodes as Nathan Morley, and Holby City. In 2009, he appeared in four episodes of EastEnders, as playboy footballer Ellis Prince.

Obiora gained attention as the openly gay receptionist Ben Trueman, in the main cast of the drama series Hotel Babylon (2006–2009). He played nurse Lloyd Asike for two seasons (2011–2013), on the long-running medical drama Casualty. He was part of international ensemble that formed the cast of the 2015 epic eleven-part crime thriller, Fortitude, filmed in Iceland. He then appeared in the 2016 film Hooten & the Lady, shot in South Africa.

He starred in the television remake of Guy Ritchie's Snatch, as New York jewelry dealer Nas Stone. He starred as Errol Minty in Luther, between 2015 and 2019. In 2018 he played Baxter in the Tomb Raider film reboot. In 2021, he starred as a charismatic American preacher in the comedy series Jerk.

In 2023 Michael Obiora was announced as part of the cast of the Martin Clunes led six-part ITV series Out There. It was released in January 2025.

Obiora made his directorial debut with the short film Soaperstar in 2020, which he also wrote and starred in. The work earned him: Film Short: Award of Recognition and Award of Merit: Best Actor, at the Best Shorts Awards 2020; Best Actor at the Europe Film Festival 2020; and it was officially selected for screening at the Pan African Film Festival 2021. In 2021, he wrote, directed and starred in the short film KARMArcus, winning Best Actor at the London Movie Awards 2021 for his role as Marcus, as well as Outstanding Short Script at the Black Swan International Film Festival 2022.

Obiora has worked as a voice artist for a number of years, including: advertising campaigns for Adidas, Jacamo and others; narration on the London to Lagos: Lifestyles of The Super Rich television documentary; and the voice of Chike in the American cartoon series Robozuna and Valentin in Kitti Katz. He has narrated numerous audiobooks, including works by Sarah Burns, Courttia Newland, Wole Soyinka and others. He narrated the part of Theo, a Nigerian-American art historian, for the audiobook of Geraldine Brooks' historical fiction novel, Horse, sharing an AudioFile magazine Earphone Award – with the other four narrators – in 2022.

Obiora played DS Watende Robinson in the BBC Radio 4 detective drama Craven, from 2009 to 2014.

Obiora's first novel, Black Shoes, was released in 2009. His second novel, Vivian's Couch, was published in November 2014. His debut children's book Zee Zee The Humble Bee was published in March 2025.

On World Poetry Day in 2026 Obiora released On This Day I Thought, a poetry collection written over eighteen years. It is structured as a series of dated reflections capturing personal thoughts on identity, ambition, grief, relationships, and mental health. Other published works released by Obiora in 2026 include a book of monologues for actors called 24 Monologues for Male Thespians, and a short story collection titled Life Can Be Short.

== Personal life ==
Obiora is a sports and fitness enthusiast and is a keen Arsenal fan. In 2008 he was diagnosed with celiac disease and has thus had to control his diet.

In 2014, Obiora married his long term partner in a beach wedding ceremony in her native Seychelles. The couple have a child who was born in 2020.

== Performances ==
=== Film and television ===
| Year | Show | Role |
|---|---|---|
| 1998–2002 | Grange Hill | Max Abassi |
| 2002 | Doctors | Adam Charlton |
| 2003 | The Bill | Nathan Morley |
| 2003 | Holby City | Perry Green |
| 2004 | Sea of Souls | Lucas |
| 2004 | Powers | Tyrone Lewis |
| 2004 | My Family | Jack |
| 2005 | Judge John Deed | Jez Balfe |
| 2006 | Bombshell | Gunner Jackson Clark |
| 2006 | Afterlife | Terence Olivets |
| 2006–2009 | Hotel Babylon | Ben Trueman |
| 2007 | Doctor Who | DI Billy Shipton |
| 2007 | The MOBOS | Himself; Guest Presenter |
| 2007 | Children in Need | Ben Trueman |
| 2008 | Big Brothers Big Mouth | Himself |
| 2008 | Nuts TV | Himself |
| 2008–2015 | The Wright Stuff | Himself; Guest Panelist |
| 2008 | Soccer AM | Himself |
| 2008 | Ready Steady Cook | Himself; Contestant |
| 2008 | Breakfast | Himself |
| 2009–2015 | OH TV | Himself; Guest Panelist |
| 2009 | Celebrity MasterChef | Himself |
| 2009 | EastEnders | Ellis |
| 2009 | Misfits | Detective Pete |
| 2011 | Lethal | Andrew |
| 2011–2013 | Casualty | Lloyd Asike |
| 2015 | Fortitude | Max Cordero |
| 2015, 2019 | Luther | Errol Minty |
| 2016 | Hooten & the Lady | Julian |
| 2017 | Midsomer Murders | Oliver Marcet |
| 2017 | Anxious | Dr Harwood |
| 2017 | Snatch | Nas Stone |
| 2018 | Tomb Raider | Baxter |
| 2018 | Downtime | Ed |
| 2018–2020 | Robozuna | Chike/Sarcio |
| 2020 | Death in Paradise | Christopher Williams |
| 2020 | Soaperstar | Aidan Okafor |
| 2021 | Jerk | Preacher |
| 2021 | KARMArcus | Marcus |
| 2023 | Kitti Katz | Valentin |
| 2023 | Joyeux Noel | Brian Darnell |
| 2024 | Sexy Beast | Dutch |
| 2025 | Joe Kerr: Laughter Is Therapy | Joe Kerr |
| 2025 | Out There | Scott Foley |

=== Audiobooks ===
| Year | Title | Author |
|---|---|---|
| 2019 | The Clapback | Elijah Lawal |
| 2019 | Are We Nearly There Yet? | |
| 2020 | Stories for Rainy Days | Ladybird |
| 2020 | The Central Park 5 | Sarah Burns |
| 2020 | The Tales of Catt and Fisher: After the War, Book 3 | Justina Robson |
| 2021 | The Road to Wigan Pier | George Orwell |
| 2021 | A River Called Time | Courttia Newland |
| 2021 | Still Breathing: 100 Black Voices on Racism - 100 Ways to Change the Narrative | Suzanne Packer & Suzette Llewelyn |
| 2021 | The 392 | Ashley Hickson-Lovence |
| 2021 | Chronicles from the Land of the Happiest People on Earth | Wole Soyinka |
| 2022 | African Town | Charles Waters |
| 2022 | A Black Boy at Eton | Dillibe Onyeama |
| 2022 | Plan For Chaos | John Wyndham |
| 2022 | Horse | Geraldine Brooks |
| 2022 | On Java Road | Lawrence Osborne |
| 2023 | And Then He Sang A Lullaby | Ani Kayode |
| 2023 | Roman Stories | Jhumpa Lahiri |
| 2024 | The Super Sunny Murder Club | Abiola Bello |
| 2025 | Captain of Fates | Katherine Webber |
| 2025 | Vivian's Couch | Michael Obiora |
| 2025 | Whites | Norman Rush |
| 2026 | The Fist of Memory | Wole Talabi |

== See also ==
- List of people diagnosed with coeliac disease
