= Francesca Martinez =

British comedian (born 1978)

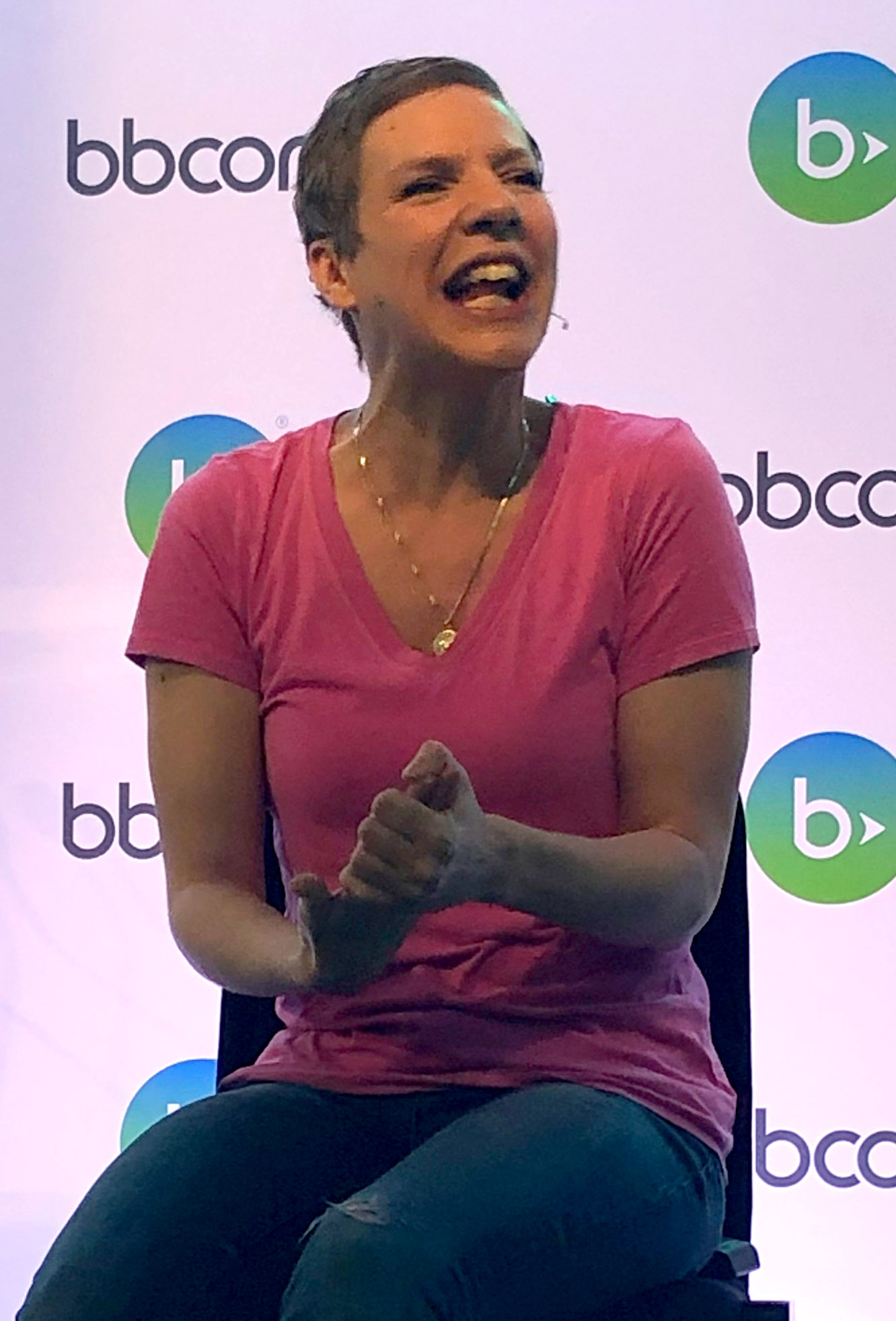
Martinez in 2019

Francesca Martinez (born 1978) is an English comedian, writer and actress. She has cerebral palsy, but prefers to describe herself as "wobbly". Martinez first came to public attention in 1994, when she made her debut on the television series Grange Hill, where she went on to portray the role of Rachel Burns for a total of 55 episodes.

Later turning her focus to stand-up comedy, she has performed at the Edinburgh Festival and internationally, including the Melbourne Comedy Festival, the Adelaide Fringe Festival, the Perth Festival and the Just for Laughs Festival in Montreal. In 2018 she completed a 140-date tour, and has had off-West End London runs at the Tricycle Theatre, the Hackney Empire, and the Soho Theatre.

Martinez's first play, 'All Of Us', was directed by Ian Rickson (Jerusalem, Uncle Vanya). Due to open at the National Theatre in March 2020, it was postponed because of Covid, and finally premiered in July 2022. The play was a hit, receiving rave reviews, and a standing ovation for each performance. Martinez was later nominated for the George Devine Award 2022 - one of the most prestigious awards for promising playwrights. 'All of Us' was included in the Guardian’s ‘Best Theatre of 2022’ list, and in the British Theatre Guide ‘Top Picks of 2022’. It was also named ‘New Play of the Year’ on BritishTheatre.com. The play is available to stream worldwide on NT at HOME.

== Early life ==
Martinez was born in London to a Spanish father and a half-Swedish, half-English mother in 1978. She was diagnosed with cerebral palsy aged two. Martinez was also incorrectly diagnosed as intellectually disabled by a consultant physician, but her parents chose for her to be educated at an integrated school, an experience that Martinez enjoyed. She later attended an all-girls' high school, an experience that harmed her previously good self-esteem. She was 14 when she secured a role on the series Grange Hill.

== Career ==
Before becoming a comedian, Martinez appeared in the BBC children's drama series Grange Hill from 1994 to 1998, where she played the first disabled pupil to appear in the fictional school, and has acted in other drama series such as Holby City.

A year after she began performing stand-up comedy, in 2000, Martinez became the first female comic to win the prestigious Daily Telegraph Open Mic Award at the Edinburgh Festival. She performed her debut solo show, I'mPerfect, in 2002. In 2003 she was listed in The Observer as one of the 50 funniest acts in British comedy.

In August 2005, she appeared in the BBC sitcom Extras.

In April 2008, Martinez made global headlines when (live on Channel 4 News) she became the first Olympic torch bearer to pull out of the London relay in protest over China's treatment of Tibet.

Martinez performed at the 2008 World Economic Forum in Davos, Switzerland alongside Emma Thompson.

In April 2009, she appeared on the BBC Radio 4 stand-up comedy show, 4 Stands Up.

In October 2012, she made her debut appearance on BBC Radio 4's topical panel show The News Quiz, alongside regulars Jeremy Hardy and Sandi Toksvig. She appeared on The News Quiz again in January and July 2013.

In 2014, her best-selling book WHAT THE **** IS NORMAL?! was published by Random House to critical acclaim. It was nominated for the Chortle Comedy 'Best Book' Award and The Bread And Roses Radical Publishing Award in 2015. Her tour of the same name clocked up over 140 dates around the world – winning a Fringe Media Network Award at the Edinburgh Fringe, as well as being nominated for Best Show at Dave's Leicester Comedy Festival and at the Perth Festival, Australia.

In 2015, she opened series 11 of Live At The Apollo, which also featured Alan Carr and Nish Kumar. In 2016, Martinez supported Frankie Boyle on his sell-out UK tour Hurt Like You've Never Been Loved.

Martinez has become a regular face on television, including appearances on The Frank Skinner Show, Russell Howard's Good News (BBC Three), The Jonathan Ross Show, ITV's Loose Women, Free Speech (BBC3), RTÉ's The Saturday Night Show with Brendan O'Connor, Adam Hills Tonight, Spicks and Specks and Question Time on BBC1.

Martinez has written scripts for the BBC and Channel 4. In 2018, her debut radio play How We're Loved aired on BBC Radio Four.

== Campaigning ==
On 8 December 2012, Martinez launched a campaign War on Welfare which pledged to get 100,000 supporters to sign a petition calling for an end to UK government cuts for disability benefits and an independent impact assessment of the government's welfare changes. The petition attracted 5,000 signatures in the first 48 hours and achieved its target of 100,000 supporters on 30 November 2013.

An outspoken opponent of welfare reform by the government, she uses her public profile to raise issues about disability and fight for what she believes would be a fairer system. Martinez said: "As a disabled person in the media, I want to help give this issue a voice. It's morally wrong for the government to target those in need instead of saving money by targeting the real causes of this crisis – and close tax loopholes and regulate the financial sector. To me, it's a human rights issue."

She is patron of a number of charities.

She has challenged the government in numerous TV interviews, including on Newsnight and This Week, and in other TV appearances such as Question Time.

In 2015 she helped organise This Changes Everything, a one-day event on climate and social justice, with Naomi Klein, Russell Brand, and many other speakers. The event was streamed globally and aimed to kick-start a movement to unify the left against climate change.

== Awards and nominations ==
In 2013 she was nominated for a Women in Public Life Award, and won the Public Affairs Achiever of the Year Award. In April 2014 she was named as one of Britain's most influential women in the BBC Woman's Hour power list 2014. She was also nominated for Red Magazine's Woman of the Year Award 2014 and for a European Diversity Hero of the Year Award 2014.

Martinez has received honorary doctorates from the Open University and Bradford University.

She was elected a Fellow of the Royal Society of Literature in 2022.

== Political views ==
In July 2015, Martinez endorsed Jeremy Corbyn's campaign in the Labour Party leadership election. In 2016, along with other celebrities, Martinez toured the UK to support Corbyn's bid to become Prime Minister. In September 2016, she performed at the Keep Corbyn rally in Brighton in support of Corbyn's campaign in the Labour Party leadership election.

In November 2019, along with other public figures, Martinez signed a letter supporting Corbyn. In December 2019, along with 42 other leading cultural figures, she signed a letter endorsing the Labour Party under Corbyn's leadership in the 2019 general election.
