= Amy Phillips (actress) =

British actress (born 1978)

- Born: Amy Simcock; 20 August 1978 (age 46); England
- Occupation: Actress
- Height: 5 ft 5 in (165 cm)

Amy Phillips (born Amy Simcock, 20 August 1978) is a British actress. She is best known for her role as Jessica Arnold in the BBC school drama Grange Hill, in which she acted between 1994 and 1998.

In Grange Hill, Amy's character was from a middle-class family and was sent to Grange Hill from an exclusive girls' school when her father's business fell on hard times. She quickly adapted to life at Grange Hill and won a firm following among male fans. In 1996, viewers saw the previously feisty Jessica become bedridden with chronic fatigue syndrome (or M.E. as the condition was then popularly known). Simcock appeared in just the first four episodes of the 1996 series, with Jessica sent to the USA to recuperate.

Despite returning to Grange Hill as an integral part of the 1997 series, where Jessica would cause a stir as editor of the school magazine, Simcock appeared in just two episodes of the 1998 series. The explanation was: Jessica had left Grange Hill in favour of sixth form college. In September 1997, Simcock appeared in the CITV comedy drama Knight School as Lady Elizabeth de Gossard, having now changed her professional name to Amy Phillips.

Post-Grange Hill, Phillips has continued to make regular occasional appearances in various TV shows, the most notable being as Beth Partridge in the BBC series Rescue Me. She has also appeared in the Hollywood movies Global Heresy and The Freediver.
