= Clive Hill =

British actor (born 1958)

Clive Hill (born 12 April 1958 in Port Talbot, South Wales) is a British actor. He started acting whilst at school, but did his formal training in dance at the Laban Centre in London.

After graduating, he performed in multi-media theatre, choreographed, and did fight arranging for various productions. In 1984, he choreographed the world premiere of Sue Townsend The Secret Diary of Adrian Mole, Aged 13¾ .

His work as an actor includes West End theatre, radio, television and film. He played the sports teacher Dai Hard Jones in six series of BBC's Grange Hill (1997–2002), has appeared in Casualty for the BBC and was the defence solicitor, Colin Francis in BBC Wales's legal series, The Bench.

He has changed his professional name to that of his married name, Clive Willbond-Hill.
