= Charlotte McDonagh =

British actress

- Charlotte on the set of REDD's "Here Come all the boys" in 2005
- Years active: 1987–Present

Charlotte McDonagh is a British actress, model, dancer, singer, and TV presenter. She became known for her role as Lisa West in Grange Hill.

== Career ==
McDonagh's career when she was three years old, modelling for various catalogues before taking young roles in West End productions of Annie Get Your Gun and later Les Misérables.

Her first television acting role was in Paul Merton in Galton and Simpson's... She joined the long-running children's show Grange Hill in 1997 as Lisa West, a role she played until 2002. She appeared as a guest film reviewer on Live & Kicking in 1999 and had a cameo on Child Stars in 2001.

She has also had roles in pantomimes Jack and the Beanstalk (2001) and Aladdin (2003) She next presented on Nickelodeon before having a brief stint presenting CBBC. In November 2002, McDonagh appeared in an episode of The Bill as Kirsty, a friend of Samantha Nixon's missing daughter. A year later, she appeared in BBC daytime soap Doctors as Sally Adams. In 2003 she appeared in an episode of Coming Up. The following year, she played Donna in the CBBC show, Kerching! and appeared as Kerry in the Channel 4 film, Matchmaker.

In January 2004, she joined the girl group REDD, managed by David Anderson of DMA Management. The band recorded one single, 'Here Come All the Boys', later recorded by Katerine Avgoustakis. A low budget video for the single was filmed, featuring the girls working in a garage. However, when Girls Aloud released the single 'Long Hot Summer' in August 2005 with a similarly themed video, REDD's single was delayed in order for a new video to be shot. The new video, set in a clothes shop, was not completed, and the original video was given a quiet release to television. The single itself was eventually shelved altogether and REDD disbanded in the autumn of 2005.

In 2005, McDonagh toured with dance act Uniting Nations, performing across Europe to over 35,000 people and worked as a backing singer for Westlife. McDonagh appeared in EastEnders in December 2005 as Stacey Slater's former friend Abby. In January 2007, McDonagh starred as Sharon in two episodes of Lynda La Plante's Trial & Retribution. In October 2007 she took roles in the short films Lucky-Dip-Pick-N-Mix and Endless Days.

In October 2008, McDonagh began presenting a digital bingo station alongside a role presenting on The Chat and Party People.

In February 2009, McDonagh began working on a music demo, with a view to release material through the following year. In June 2010 Understate City single 'No Way' featuring vocals by McDonagh previewed on the internet. The song received some positive reviews, and was said to be "destined for chart success" with a release planned for the summer of 2010. However, commercial release of the single was cancelled later that year.

McDonagh was for a period signed to McLean/Williams talent agency alongside Universal Model Management Ltd.

In 2024 Charlotte appeared as a guest on the Grange Hill Podcast ‘Sausage On A Fork’ where she discussed her time on the show and her career away from it.

== Personal life ==
In 2015, McDonagh launched a business venture callers Singalong Princess Parties for Children, based in Barnet.
