= Rachel Bell =

English actress

- Born: 1950 (age 75–76); Newcastle upon Tyne, England
- Occupation: Actress
- Years active: 1980–present

Rachel Bell (born 1950 in Newcastle upon Tyne) is an English actress. She has many television credits to her name and has been associated as a long-running character with three series: Margaret Holmes in Grange Hill (1997–2002); Edith Pilchester in The Darling Buds of May (1991–1993); and Louise, the overbearing chair of the divorcee support group in Dear John (1986–1987). She also appeared in the Only Fools and Horses episode "To Hull and Back" (1985) and the Doctor Who story The Happiness Patrol (1988). In 1990, she played a barmaid in Last of the Summer Wine, episode "Roll On".

Her films include Sweet William (1980), Red Mercury (2005), and the 2008 Keira Knightley film The Edge of Love. In 2010, she played Hyacinth Bucket in a theatrical adaptation of the BBC situation comedy Keeping Up Appearances that toured the UK. In 2017, she began portraying the recurring role of Eve Haskey in the BBC soap opera Doctors.
