= Kate Bell (British actress) =

British actress

Kate Bell (born 21 April 1981) is a British actress, best known for her role as Kelly Bradshaw in the long-running BBC school drama Grange Hill. She appeared in the show from 1995 to 2001.

She has also appeared in The Bill and the children's series Samson Superslug.
