= Aidan J. David =

British actor

Aidan J. David (born 23 December 1981) is a British actor, best known for playing James Arnold (Arnie) in the BBC school drama Grange Hill. He appeared in the show from 1994 to 2001.

Arnie, who came from an affluent background, was one of the show's most popular characters during the 1990s, and in 2000 the previously healthy character had to come to terms with epilepsy. In a first for Grange Hill, Arnie was brought back for an extra year in 2001 along with classmate Colin Brown (Colin Ridgewell). Previously, no pupils had ever stayed in the show longer than seven consecutive series.

Aidan has since appeared in The Bill, Casualty, Rose and Maloney and Inspector Morse. He also features in Ed Sheeran ft Khalid "Beautiful People" video.
