= Sally Geoghegan =

English actress

Sally Geoghegan is an English actress. She is best known for playing teacher Jayne (or Jane) Carver in the long-running CBBC school drama Grange Hill between 1995 and 2002. She left the series when production moved from London to Liverpool.

She has also appeared in Carlton TV's Head Over Heels and BBC One's Bernard and the Genie.

Geoghegan appeared in the 2002 S Club Juniors video "One Step Closer".
