= Lee Cornes =

British actor and writer

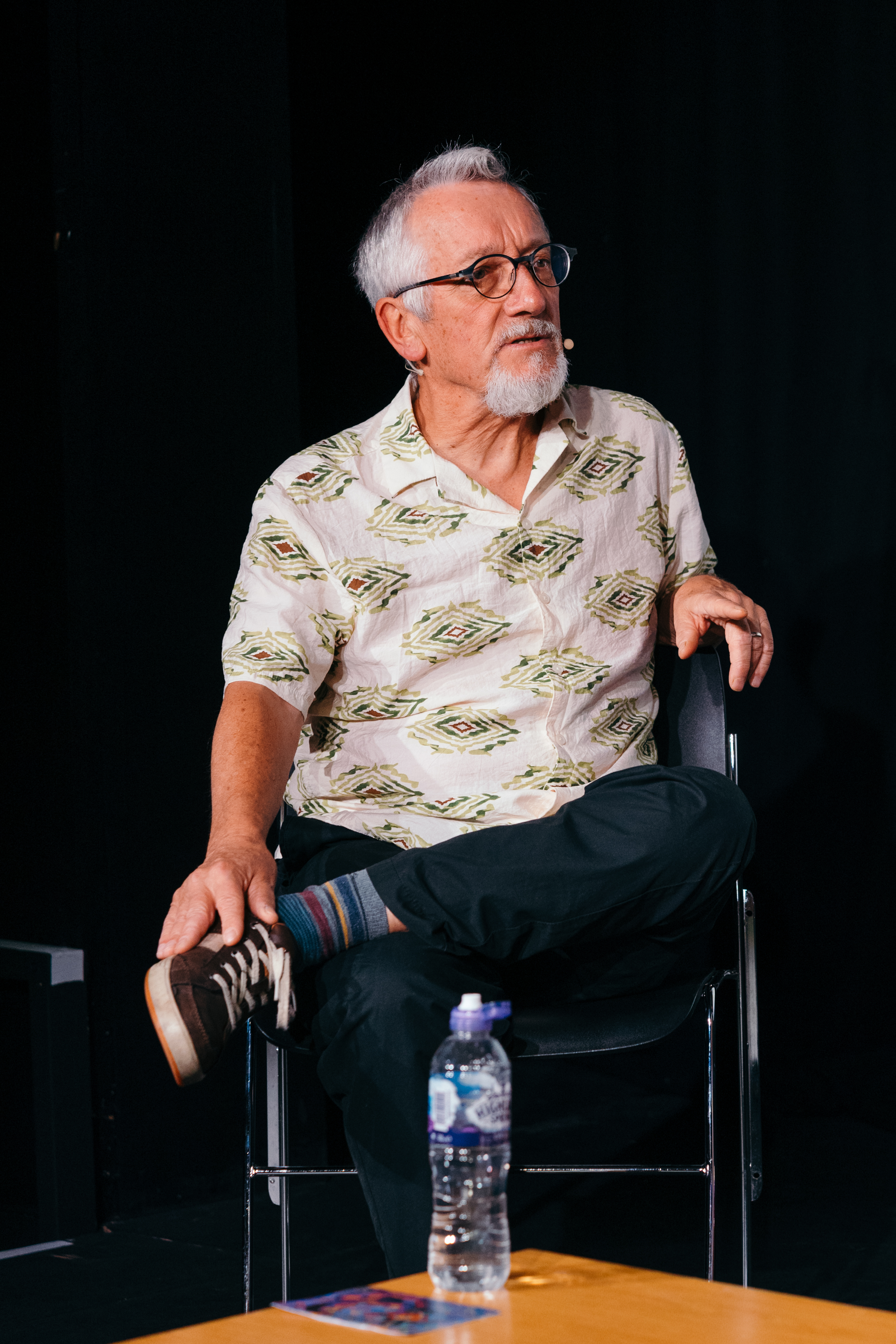
- Cornes at the 2025 Edinburgh Festival Fringe
- Born: Hayes, London, England
- Occupations: Actor, comedian, writer, teacher
- Years active: 1980–present
- Known for: Grange Hill; Blackadder; Bottom; Red Dwarf; The WOW show

Lee Cornes is an English television actor and writer born in Hayes, London.

== Career ==
Cornes began performing at London's Comedy Store in 1979, he was a regular compere at the club throughout the 1980s. He met Stephen Frost, Mark Arden and Paul Mark Elliott while working at the club and they formed a comedy troupe called The WOW Show. They were nominated for Best Comedy Show at the Edinburgh Comedy Awards in 1987 and 1988.

Cornes appeared in three series of Blackadder, in two episodes of The Young Ones and as barman 'Dick Head' in the TV show Bottom. He made an appearance in the first episode of Filthy, Rich & Catflap as a binman. Appeared in the Comic Strip episode "Slags". Appearances on Saturday Night Live. Cornes also starred in children's drama Grange Hill as Mr. Jeff Hankin (1990–2002); provided voices for characters in the children's television series TUGS, and featured in the Doctor Who story "Kinda" as the Trickster (1982). He appeared in Red Dwarf as Paranoia in the series one episode "Confidence and Paranoia". He also appeared several times in the BBC Scotland sitcom Rab C. Nesbitt, once as a DSS Clerk and again as a barman in a Highland pub.

He played a major role as the harassed talent agent Dickie Valentino in the 1994 partially-improvised comedy film There's No Business..., alongside comedy duos Raw Sex (Simon Brint and Rowland Rivron) and The Oblivion Boys (Stephen Frost and Mark Arden).

He appeared in the 2002 S Club Juniors video "One Step Closer."

In November 2010, he appeared as Dave in Episode 6 of E4 comedy Phoneshop. He appeared as the Tooting Flasher in Matt Berry's Toast of London pilot. Appeared in Hustle. Also appearances in French and Saunders, The Lenny Henry Show, The Detectives, After You've Gone, and My Family.

Stage appearances include Ken Campbell's The Warp at the Liverpool Everyman, several roles at the Orange Tree Theatre, Richmond. Figaro at The Watford Palace Theatre, as well as pantomime roles. Co-writer and performer The WOW Show at the Wyndham's Theatre. He toured Britain with Neal from the Young Ones.

Cornes was one of the lead writers for Mr Bean, The Animated Series, and a writer on Cavegirl and Channel 4's Gophers!. He was a co-writer of Channel 4's animation series The Bird, and writer/storyliner on What's Up Doc?, a writer and performer on Thames TV's After Hours and joint writer on two series of The WOW Show on Radio 4. He has appeared in various children's television shows such as My Parents are Aliens, Bear Behaving Badly, Jackanory.

== Legacy ==
In a 2010 interview in The Times, Cornes was cited as one of fellow comedian Sean Lock's biggest comedic influences. Lock said: "He’s not very well known but he is my main influence — he used to compere at the Comedy Store. He’s the comedians’ comedian. He used to be very unpredictable, which is a great skill in a comedian, not knowing where to go next. He also used to play the physics teacher in Grange Hill."

== Filmography ==
=== Film/TV ===
Year	Title	Role	Notes
1980	The Further Adventures of Oliver Twist	Barney	3 episodes
1982	Doctor Who	Trickster	"Kinda" Parts 2 and 3
1982	Uliisses	Unknown	Film
1984	The Comic Strip Presents...	Arch Crippledick	1 episode ("Slags")
1984	The Young Ones	MC; Spasspecker	2 episodes ("Cash", "Time")
1985	The Lenny Henry Show	Various	1 episode (Episode #2.5)
1985	Up Our Street	Various	4 episodes
1986	Blackadder II	2nd Guard	1 episode ("Chains")
1986	Lenny Henry Tonite	Unknown	1 episode ("Neighbourhood Watch")
1987	The Love Child	Man in Supermarket	Film
1987	Filthy Rich & Catflap	Dustman	1 episode ("Dead Milkmen")
1987	Blackadder the Third	Shelley	1 episode ("Ink and Incapability")
1988	Red Dwarf	Paranoia	1 episode ("Confidence and Paranoia")
1988	Knowhow	Tobias Trumble	1 episode
1988-1990	Colin's Sandwich	Graham	8 episodes
1989	Morris Minor's Marvellous Motors	Cooper 3	1 episode ("Nightmare")
1989	Tugs	Grampus; Billy Shoepack; Boomer; Fuel Depot	Voice
1989	Close to Home	Parrot	1 episode ("Father and Family"), voice
1989	Blackadder Goes Forth	Private Fraser	1 episode ("Corporal Punishment")
1989	Mornin' Sarge	Oily	2 episodes
1990-2002	Grange Hill	Mr. Hankin	
1990-1993	Rab C. Nesbitt	D.S.S. Clerk; Barman	3 episodes
1991	Screen One	Preston Scott	1 episode ("Filipina Dreamgirls")
1991	Performance	Marty Feldman	1 episode ("The Trials of Oz")
1991-1995	Bottom	Dick Head	3 episodes ("Smells", "Parade", "Dough")
1993	French and Saunders	Dickie Valentino	1 episode ("In Bed With French and Saunders")
1993	I, Lovett	Bingley	1 episode ("Imagine")
1993	The Full Monty	Various	
1994	The All New Alexei Sayle Show	Various	1 episode
1994	There's No Business	Dickie Valentino	
1995	Jack & Jeremy's Police 4	Detective	TV Movie
1995	Spot's Magical Christmas	Deer 2	Voice, UK version
1995	Eleven Men Against Eleven	Journalist	TV Movie
1995	Drunk and Disorderly	Unknown	
1996-1997	Detectives	Dr. Pete	2 episodes
1996	Saturday Live	Various	1 episode
1996	Jack and Jeremy's Real Lives	Various	4 episodes
1997	Loved by You	Gary	1 episode
1997	Like It or Lump It	Unknown	1 episode
1997	Does China Exist?	Unknown	TV Movie
1998	Adam's Family Tree	Jack	1 episode ("The Irate Pirate")
2002-2004	15 Storeys High	Unknown	2 episodes
2005	Hustle	Ray Bond	1 episode ("The Lesson")
2006	Jam & Jerusalem	Patient	1 episode ("Sudden Death")
2008	Teenage Kicks	Tim Bennet	1 episode ("Goodbye Cruel Worm")
2008	After You've Gone	Mr. Deakin	1 episode ("There Will Be Pud")
2009	Bear Behaving Badly	Todd	1 episode ("Bird Brain")
2010	My Family	Council Official	1 episode ("Wheelie Ben")
2010	PhoneShop	Dave	1 episode ("Soldier, Swinger, Shelley, Shelley")
2012	Toast of London	Flasher	1 episode ("The Flasher of London")
2016	The National Union of Space People	News Reader	Film
2024	Bottom: Exposed	Self	Documentary

=== Writing Credits ===
Year	Title	Notes
1990	Gophers!	2 episodes
1994	What's Up Doc?	14 episodes
2002-2003	Mr. Bean: The Animated Series	7 episodes

== Sources ==
- "Mr Flibble Talks To ... Lee Cornes". 18 May 2001.
