= Stuart Organ =

British actor (1951–2024)

- Born: Stuart Adrian Organ; 8 November 1951; Bromley, Kent, England
- Died: 15 February 2024 (aged 72)
- Education: Cranbrook School, Kent
- Occupation: Actor
- Years active: 1976–2023
- Spouse: Julia Kehore (m. 2002)

Stuart Adrian Organ (8 November 1951 – 15 February 2024) was a British actor, best known for his role as teacher Peter Robson on the television series Grange Hill. He appeared as the character from 1988 to 2003, across 260 episodes.

== Career ==
=== Television and film ===
Organ was best known for his portrayal of the character Mr. Robson in the children's television drama Grange Hill. Organ portrayed the series' longest-serving teacher, arriving in 1988 as the new head of PE. In 1998, he finally landed the headmaster's job, but left the series in 2003 soon after production of Grange Hill transferred to Liverpool.

Prior to Grange Hill, Organ appeared as Kevin Cross in the Mersey TV soap opera Brookside, and played Bazin in the Doctor Who story Dragonfire in 1987. Thereafter, he appeared in a variety of roles on TV, including Monk, a flasher who exposed himself to Anna and yet was defended by Miles in This Life; Richard Thornton, who stalked Acting DI Sam Nixon across a double episode special in The Bill, and later as DI Dixon in 2000; Leighton Peters, a top civil servant who was responsible for the downfall of Anthony Calf's character in a double episode of Holby City; and as solicitor Steve Morris in series 13, episode 14 of London's Burning.

=== Theatre ===
Later, he concentrated on work in the theatre, where his professional acting career had first started in 1976. His roles include Guy Burgess in An Englishman Abroad (York Theatre Royal, 2003); Egeus in The Comedy of Errors (Sheffield Crucible, 2004); George in Who's Afraid of Virginia Woolf? (Queens Theatre, Hornchurch, 2005); Robert in Blue/Orange (Ipswich, 2006); and Serge in 'Art' (York Theatre Royal, 2006). He then returned to the Queens Theatre, to play Major Powell in their 2007 play Corpse.

=== Voicework ===
His regular voice work included lip-synching and dubbing cartoons and video games, including Star Wars: The Old Republic. Organ was also a familiar voice to London Underground tube passengers, announcing stations, lines, late arrivals and telling users to "mind the gap".

== Personal life and death ==
Stuart Adrian Organ was born in Bromley on 8 November 1951. He was educated at Cranbrook School. He married Julia Kehore in 2002.

Organ died on 15 February 2024, at the age of 72.

== Selected filmography ==
Year	Title	Role	Notes
1983	Those Glory Glory Days	1961 Spurs team member	Television film
1983	By The World Divided	Corp. Turner/Sgt. Turner	4 episodes
1984	All The World's A Stage		
1984–1986, 1988–1989, 1999	Brookside	Kevin Cross	23 episodes
1985	Bulman	Police sergeant	Series 1 episode 13
1987	Doctor Who	Bazin	Dragonfire episodes 1&3
1988–2003	Grange Hill	Mr Robson	265 episodes
1991	Robin Hood	Friar Tuck	Animated film; voice only
1994–1995	Shirayuki-hime no densetsu		English version; voice only; 52 episodes
1995	The Princess and the Pirate: Sandokan the TV Movie	Sandokan	Voice only
1996	Casualty	Ken	Series 10 episode 18
1996	This Life	Monk	Series 1 episode 10
1996	Wycliffe	Eddie Sowden	Series 3 episode 1
1996	Fork In The Road		Short film
1999	The Waiting Time	Major Perry Johnson	Television film
1999	Holby City	Tom Prewitt	Series 1 episode 3
2000	Alex and Alexis		Voice only
2003	40	Registrar	
2004	Bad Girls	Duty Officer Smithson	Series 6 episode 6
2004	Mile High	Major Crockland	Series 2 episode 17
2004–2005	Down to Earth	Len Parker	6 episodes
2005	Judge John Deed	Jonathan Powell	Series 4 and episode 4
2005	Holby City	Leighton Peters	Series 7 episode 52
2006	Random Quest	Bates	Television series
2006	Rat-Man	Capt. Kirk	1 episode; voice only
2007	Maxwell	Peter Laister	Television film
2007–2008	Secret Diary of a Call Girl	Hannah's Dad / Niall	3 episodes
2008	Hairy Scary		Voice only
2010	Above Suspicion	DCI Morgan	Series 2 episode 1
2012	Crime Stories	Doug Harper	Series 1 episode 8
2013	Law & Order: UK	Aaron Walker	Series 7 episode 6
2013	Lucan	Judge	
2016	Marina and Adrienne	Skipper	Short film
2020	Bridgerton	Doctor	Series 1 episode 4
2023	The Gnomes Great Adventure	David	Voice only
