= List of grunge bands =

Notable grunge bands include:

== United States ==
The "Big 4" of Grunge are typed in bold.

=== Seattle area ===
- 7 Year Bitch
- Alcohol Funnycar
- **Alice in Chains**
- Blood Circus
- Brad
- Coffin Break
- Foo Fighters (early)
- Gas Huffer
- The Gits
- Green River
- Gruntruck
- Hammerbox
- Love Battery
- Mad Season
- Malfunkshun
- Melvins
- Mother Love Bone
- Mudhoney
- My Sister's Machine
- **Nirvana**
- **Pearl Jam**
- The Presidents of the United States of America
- Screaming Trees
- Seaweed
- Skin Yard
- **Soundgarden**
- Sweet Water
- Tad
- Temple of the Dog
- Willard

=== Elsewhere in the United States ===
- The Afghan Whigs (Cincinnati, Ohio)
- Babes In Toyland (Minneapolis, Minnesota)
- Calamity Jane (Portland, Oregon)
- Dandelion (Philadelphia, Pennsylvania)
- Dinosaur Jr. (Amherst, Massachusetts)
- Dogstar (Los Angeles, California)
- For Squirrels (Gainesville, Florida)
- Gumball (New York City)
- Hole (Los Angeles, California)
- L7 (Los Angeles, California)
- Local H (Zion, Illinois)
- My Ticket Home (Columbus, Ohio)
- Paw (Lawrence, Kansas)
- The Smashing Pumpkins (Chicago, Illinois)
- Sponge (Detroit, Michigan)
- Stone Temple Pilots (San Diego, California)
- Superheaven (Doylestown, Pennsylvania)
- Toadies (Fort Worth, Texas)
- Veruca Salt (Chicago, Illinois)
- Wool (Washington, D.C.; based out of Los Angeles, California)

== Australia ==
- Silverchair (early)
- Spiderbait

== Canada ==
- Eric's Trip
- I Mother Earth
- King Cobb Steelie
- Our Lady Peace
- The Wooden Stars
- Rusty
- Thrush Hermit
- Sloan

== Germany ==
- Alien Boys

== United Kingdom ==
- Birdskulls
- Bush
- Daisy Chainsaw
- Dinosaur Pile-Up
- Radiohead (early work)
- Swervedriver

== France ==
- Noir Désir

== Poland ==
- Hey
- Illusion
- Kr'shna Brothers
- Houk

== Sweden ==
- Salt

== Italy ==
- Verdena

== Ireland ==
- Bleech 9:3

== See also ==
- List of post-grunge bands
