= Junk =

Junk may refer to:

== Arts and entertainment ==
- Junk (2000 film), a Japanese horror film
- Junk (2024 film), an American comedy-drama film
- J-U-N-K, a 1920 American film
- Junk (novel), by Melvin Burgess, 1996
- Junk, a novel by Christopher Largen
- Junk: Record of the Last Hero, a shōnen manga series by Kia Asamiya
- Junk: The Golden Age of Debt, a play by Ayad Akhtar

=== Music ===
- Junk (band), a British pop band
- Junk (nightclub), in Southend-on-Sea, Essex, England

==== Albums ====
- Junk, by Ferry Corsten, 2006
- Junk, by Jejune, 1997
- Junk, by Junk (band), 1995
- Junk (M83 album), 2016

==== Songs ====
- "Junk" (song), released by Paul McCartney in 1970
- "Junk", song from Bronski Beat's album The Age of Consent (album)
- "Junk", song from Zico Chain's album Food (Zico Chain album)

== Finance ==
- Junk bond
- Junk status, a debt credit rating

== Food and consumables ==
- slang for the controlled or illegal psychoactive and recreational drug heroin (diacetylmorphine)
- Junk food, low nutritional quality food types
- Salt-cured meat, frequently called junk

== People ==
- Bruno Junk (1929–1995), Estonian race walker, two-time Olympic bronze medal winner
- Dennis Junk (born 1984), German politician
- Janson Junk (born 1996), American baseball pitcher
- Sebastian Junk (born 1983), German Paralympic judoka
- Sophia Junk (born 1999), German sprinter
- Wilhelm Junk (1866–1942), Czech-born antiquarian bookseller and entomologist

== Places ==
- Junk Bay, Hong Kong
- Fat Tong Chau, Junk Island in English, a former island of Hong Kong
- Pulau Jong or Junk Island, off the coast of Singapore
- Junk, an islet near Hoy, Shetland, Scotland

== Slang ==
- Rubbish (disambiguation)
  - Waste
  - Garbage
  - Junk shop items, antique goods for retail sale or trade
  - Junkyard scrap, used automobile and machine parts for sale or trade
- Human male sex organ
- Off-speed pitch, in baseball, also called junk

== Other uses ==
- Junk (ship), a type of Chinese sailing vessel
- Junk, a sperm whale equivalent of the melon (cetacean)
- Junk data, any type of dummy data that serves the purpose to fill space on a storage medium
- Junk DNA, generic material that does not code for any proteins

== See also ==
- Junk mail (disambiguation)
