= Stephen Frost =

British comedian (born 1955)

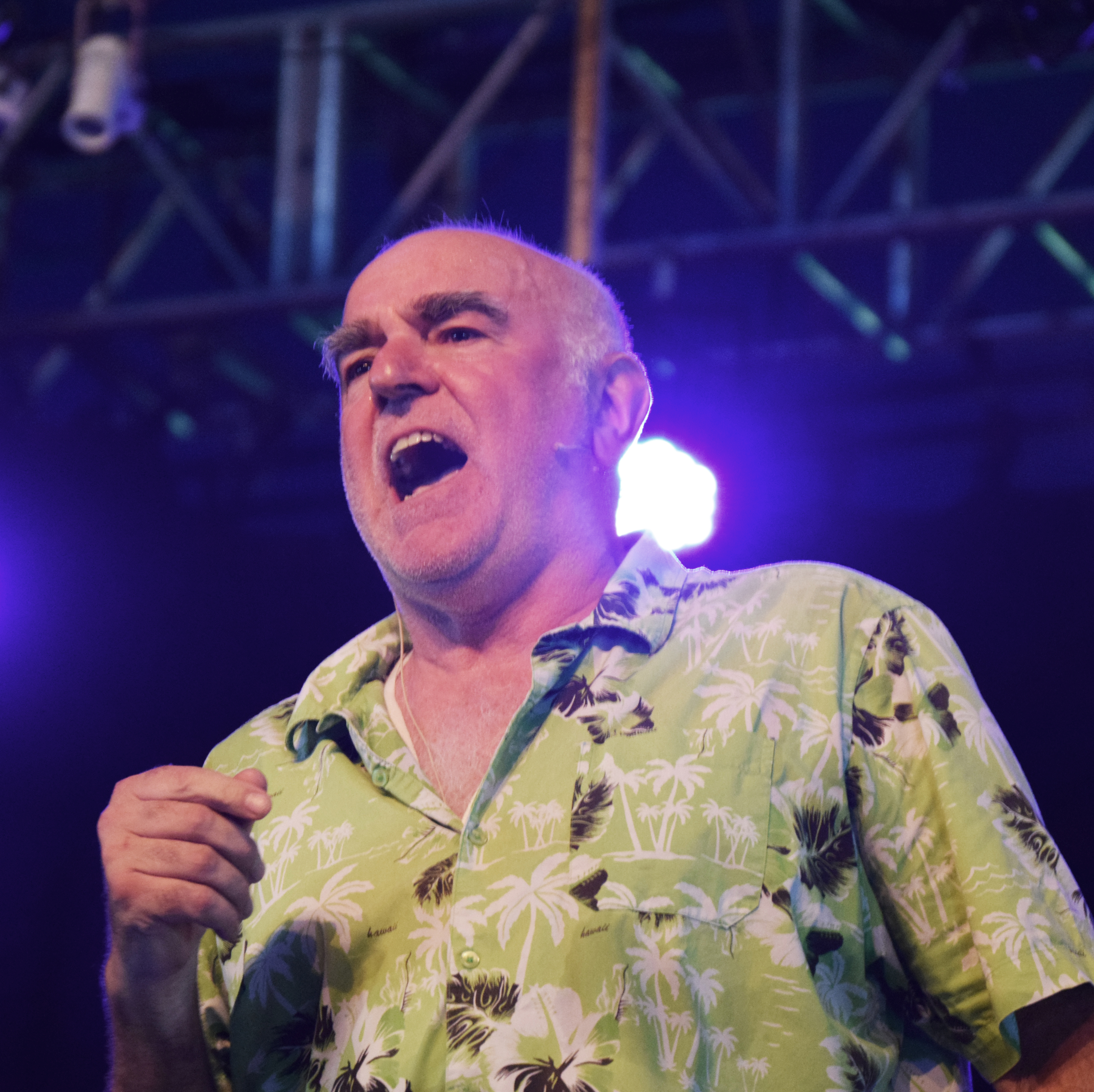
- Frost with the Stephen Frost Improv All Stars at the Glastonbury Festival in 2019
- Born: Stephen Frederick Eustace Frost; 28 December 1955 (age 70); Redruth, Cornwall, England
- Occupations: Actor, comedian
- Years active: 1980–present

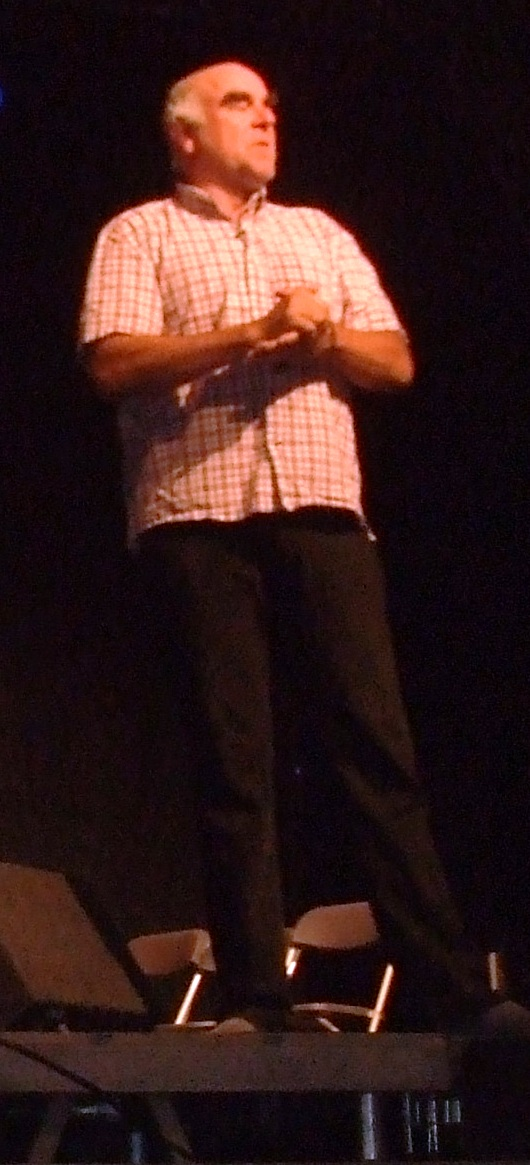
Presenting the "Stephen Frost All Stars" improvisation show, Glastonbury Festival, 2008

Stephen Frederick Eustace Frost (born 28 December 1955) is an English actor and comedian. He is best known for his work on Whose Line Is It Anyway? as well as several projects with comedy partner Mark Arden.

== Early life ==
Frost was born on 28 December 1955 in Redruth, Cornwall, and is the son of the abstract artist Terry Frost and brother of painter Anthony Frost.

He joined Banbury School (now Wykham Park Academy) in north Oxfordshire, part of Stanbridge Hall, in September 1967. The school had become comprehensive that term, but only in name; the buildings largely remained. The school transitioned over years. He played rugby for his county at age 16, and badminton locally, and athletics, in the AAA five star scheme. His brother Simon was also athletic. He took part in many school drama productions, in the sixth form, with his brothers Simon and Matthew. In the sixth form he grew a beard, and worked with the National Youth Theatre. He won a playwright award from the Royal Court Theatre. The head of the school drama group was Brian Derbyshire; the teacher left the school at the same time as Stephen, in July 1974.

He passed two O-levels, Geography and Physics. He passed one A level, Geography. His headteacher was Harry Judge. In 1974 family moved to Newlyn in Cornwall. He attended the Guildhall School of Music and Drama with Art Malik (and his wife Gina Rowe), Mark Arden and actors Jeremy Gittins and Robert McCulley.

== Career ==
=== Work with Mark Arden ===
Frost is known for his work in the 1980s with Mark Arden as part of the double act The Oblivion Boys on Saturday Live. Veterans of the alternative comedy scene, he and Arden appeared in The Young Ones, and later had their own television series Lazarus and Dingwall on BBC2. They played the lead roles in the 1987 revival of Tom Stoppard's play, Rosencrantz and Guildenstern Are Dead at the Piccadilly Theatre. They also played two robbers in 'Big Deal' series 2, in the episode 'Popping Across The Pond'.

In 1994 the Oblivion Boys starred opposite the comedy duo Raw Sex (Simon Brint and Rowland Rivron) in the partially-improvised comedy film There's No Business....

The duo appeared in a series of British TV advertisements ending with the catchphrase "I bet he drinks Carling Black Label". One spoofed the "launderette" commercial for Levi's in which Nick Kamen stripped to his underwear; in their pastiche, Arden and Frost played launderette customers who were stripped entirely, with just strategically placed books maintaining their modesty.

=== Solo work ===
Without Arden, Frost has appeared on BBC Radio 4's Just a Minute, and the improvisation show Whose Line Is It Anyway?. He has appeared on three episodes of Have I Got News for You (there was a 13-year gap between his second and third appearance) and on Never Mind the Buzzcocks. He also appeared as Dirk in Tony Bagley's series Married.

He played two small roles in Blackadder: a prison guard in the first-series episode "Witchsmeller Pursuivant", and the overly cheerful head of a firing squad in the episode "Corporal Punishment" of Blackadder Goes Forth. He also appeared in the comedy series Mr. Bean, starring Rowan Atkinson, in the episode entitled "Mr. Bean Rides Again" in one of the skits where Mr. Bean is on a train.

In 2003 he appeared in a production of 12 Angry Men alongside Bill Bailey.

Frost appeared alongside Tony Hawks and Angus Deayton in the 2012 feature film Playing the Moldovans at Tennis.

=== Currently ===
Frost is a regular on the London comedy circuit. He is also a veteran of the Edinburgh Festival Fringe and Glastonbury Festival.

Frost still appears regularly with The Comedy Store Players in The Comedy Store, London.

== Filmography ==
=== Film ===
Film
Year	Title	Role	Notes
1987	The Love Child	Tough Policeman	
1994	There's No Business	Reg Prince	
1995	Savage Hearts	Concierge	
1995	Feast of July	Man in Restaurant	
1995	Spot's Magical Christmas	Deer 1	Voice; Video short United Kingdom version Credited as Steve Frost
1998	Wind	Policeman	Short film
2000	The Suicidal Dog	Philip the Test Your Strength Man	Short film
2012	Playing the Moldovans at Tennis	Steve	
2014	The Squeakies	Compere	
2021	Phase	Dad	

=== Television ===
Television
Year	Title	Role	Notes
1981	Doctor Who	Tharil	Uncredited; Series 18: "Warriors' Gate: Part Four"
1982-1983	Carrott's Lib		8 episodes, 1 special Writer – "Best of Carrott's Lib"
1982-1984	The Young Ones	Various	7 episodes – 3 credited as Steve Frost
1983	Blackadder	Soft, A Guard	2 episodes – 1 uncredited
1983	Dramarama	Rev. Bell	Series 1, episode 2: "Rip It Up"
1983	Reilly, Ace of Spies	Styrne	Episode 11: "The Last Journey"
1983	Rebellious Jukebox	The Oblivion Boys	Episode #1.2
1983-1984	The Entertainers	The Oblivion Boys	2 episodes
1984	The Comic Strip Presents...	Bula	Series 2, episode 7: "Slags"
1985	Big Deal	Tony	Series 2, episode 14: "Popping Across the Pond"
1985	Dempsey and Makepeace	Big Mall	Series 2, episode 5: "Tequila Sunrise"
1985	Happy Families	Village Gendarme	Episode 3: "Madeleine"
1985	Girls on Top	Disco Dancer	Series 1, episode 3: "C.O.D."
1986	Kit Curran	Pates	Series 2, episode 4: "A Sick Society"
1986-1996	Saturday Live	Himself / Oblivion Boys / Various	10 episodes Writer – 1 episode
1988	Bust	Mike Benson	2 episodes
1989	Blackadder Goes Forth	Corporal Jones	Series 4, episode 2: "Corporal Punishment"
1989	Close to Home	Frank DeAngelo	4 episodes
1991	Lazarus & Dingwall	Steve Lazarus	6 episodes Writer
1991	Murder Most Horrid	Sgt. Dawkins	Series 1, episode 1: "The Case of the Missing"
1991-2005	Have I Got News for You	Himself / Panelist	3 episodes
1992	Mr. Bean	The Laughing Man	Episode 6: "Mr. Bean Rides Again"
1992	The Young Indiana Jones Chronicles	Huge Man	Series 2, episode 4: "Barcelona, May 1917"
1992	Fool's Gold: The Story of the Brink's-Mat Robbery	Bernie Clarke	TV movie
1992-1998	Whose Line Is It Anyway?	Himself / Performer	33 episodes
1993	The Almost Complete History of the 20th Century	Narrator	Voice; 13 episodes
1993-1994	Brighton Belles	Gilbert	2 episodes
1994	The All New Alexei Sayle Show	Various	Episode 6
1994	What's Up Doc?	Steve the Security Guard / Walter Flume	16 episodes Credited as Steve Frost
1994	Blue Heaven	Big Larry	Episode 1
1994	Frank Stubbs Promotes	Big Eddie	Series 2, episode 5: "Mr. Chairman"
1994	Harry Enfield & Chums	Man Painting	Episode #1.5
1994-1995	The Bill	Duggan / Colin Glover	2 episodes
1995	Jack and Jeremy's Police 4	Various	TV movie
1996	Jack and Jeremy's Real Lives	Steve / Stephen / Farmer	3 episodes
1996	Drop the Dead Donkey	Tom	Series 5, episode 7: "Charnley in Love"
1996	The Famous Five	Dirty Dick	Series 2, episode 6: "Five on a Hike Together"
1997	Gobble	Gun shop assistant	TV movie
1997	Pie in the Sky	Trubb	Series 5, episode 3: "Pork Pies"
1998	Vanity Fair	Bute Crawley	Miniseries; 4 episodes
1999	Just a Minute	Himself / Panelist	4 episodes
1999	French and Saunders	Special – "French and Saunders: The Phantom Millennium"	
2001	Mr. Charity	Cab Driver	Episode 6: "The Big W"
2002	Spheriks	Match Narrator	Voice; Credited as Steve Frost
2002-2005	Never Mind the Buzzcocks	Himself	
2004	Working the Thames	Himself / Presenter	Documentary
2011	Paul Merton's Adventures	Himself	Episode 4: "Caravan"
2013	Poirot	Chief Inspector	Series 13, episode 4: "The Labours of Hercules"
2015	Boomers	German John	Episode: "Christmas Special"
2018	Holby City	Peter Mosley	Series 20, episode 49: "Love Is"
2023	Ted Lasso	Bruce	Series 3, episode 2: "(I don't want to go to) Chelsea"

== Books ==
- Sit-Down Comedy (contributor to anthology, ed Malcolm Hardee & John Fleming) Ebury Press/Random House, 2003. ISBN 0-09-188924-3; ISBN 978-0-09-188924-1
