= Chandler & Co =

British television series

- Series 1 & 2 DVD
- Genre: Detective
- Created by: Paula Milne
- Written by: Paula Milne
- Starring: Catherine Russell; Barbara Flynn; Peter Capaldi; Struan Rodger; Ann Gosling; Susan Fleetwood; Eloise Brown; Graham McGrath; Tobias Saunders; Adrian Lukis
- Composers: Daemion Barry; Mike Moran
- Country of origin: United Kingdom
- Original language: English
- No. of series: 2
- No. of episodes: 12

Production
- Executive producers: Michael Wearing; Nicholas Palmer
- Producer: Ann Skinner
- Cinematography: Derek Suter
- Running time: 50 minutes
- Production company: Skreba Films

Original release
- Network: BBC1
- Release: 12 July 1994 – 1 September 1995

Chandler & Co is a British television detective drama series, created and written by Paula Milne, that first broadcast on BBC1, and ran for two series between 12 July 1994 and 1 September 1995. The series starred Catherine Russell as Elly Chandler, a private detective who runs her own agency. In the first series, she works alongside her sister-in-law Dee Tate (Barbara Flynn). In the second series, Tate is replaced by Kate Phillips (Susan Fleetwood), a former client turned employee. Peter Capaldi, Struan Rodger and Ann Gosling all co-starred in the first series.

Aside from Russell, the second series was made up of an entirely different cast, with Graham McGrath, Eloise Brown and Adrian Lukis among the new cast members. Both series were produced by Ann Skinner. Independent reviews of the series were mixed, however The Consulting Detective said of the series; "Chandler & Co is a wonderfully dry, witty and yet truthful series about two women finding their place in the world. It is a joy to watch and can hold its chin up high in the cavalcade of detective dramas that have gone before and since". After years of remaining unavailable on any commercial format, both series were released in a four-disc DVD box set on 5 October 2015, via Simply Media.

== Plot summary ==
The series follows the story of two female private detectives, Elly Chandler and Dee Tate, who run their own private investigation agency in London.

Each episode features a different case that the duo takes on, ranging from missing persons and thefts to murder and infidelity. The cases are often complex and require Elly and Dee to use their sharp investigative skills and intuition to solve them.

As they work together, Elly and Dee navigate their own personal lives and relationships, facing challenges and obstacles along the way. Elly is divorced and raising a young son, while Dee is a widow struggling to come to terms with the loss of her husband.

Throughout the series, the two women form a close bond and develop a deep trust in each other, both personally and professionally.

== Cast ==
- Catherine Russell as Elly Chandler
- Barbara Flynn as Dee Tate
- Peter Capaldi as Larry Blakeson
- Struan Rodger as David Tate
- Ann Gosling as Joanna Tate
- Edward Holmes as Sam Tate
- Indra Ové as Misty
- Susan Fleetwood as Kate Phillips
- Eloise Brown as Hannah Tompkins
- Graham McGrath as Benjamin Phillips
- Tobias Saunders as Danny Hogarth
- Adrian Lukis as Mark Judd
- Bill Britten as Simon Wood

== Episodes ==
=== Series overview ===
Series	Episodes	Originally released	
Series	Episodes	First released	Last released
1	6	12 July 1994	16 August 1994
2	6	28 July 1995	1 September 1995

=== Series 1 (1994) ===
No.	Title	Directed by	Written by	British air date
1	"On the Job"	Renny Rye	Paula Milne	12 July 1994
Sisters-in-law Dee Tate and Elly Chandler take on their first case, but both have very different reasons for getting involved.
2	"Wild Justice"	Renny Rye	Paula Milne	19 July 1994
Still shaken by the danger her new job has posed to the safety of her family, Dee is manoeuvred by Elly into taking another case. Elly joins an upmarket dating agency only to find herself tempted by a sexual proposition.
3	"Past Imperfect"	Renny Rye	Paula Milne	26 July 1994
Elly is put in turmoil when her philandering ex-husband Max asks for another chance and she resorts to calling on Larry to check out his love life. Dee is engaged by an irascible advertising man to look into his wife's mysterious day trips to London.
4	"The Devil You Know"	Robert Marchand	Bill Gallagher	2 August 1994
Dee gets involved in unravelling the complicated double life of a compulsive liar whose pregnant girlfriend goes missing. Meanwhile, Elly develops an unlikely bond with a sharp-tongued policewoman whose husband suspects her.
5	"Family Matters"	Robert Marchand	Jacqueline Holborough	9 August 1994
Dee's home is besieged by the tabloid press after she photographs a prominent public figure in flagrante with his mistress. Dee is determined to find out who set her up and why. Elly takes to the mean streets of King's Cross to find a young woman called Rachel, who ran away from home four years earlier. Both Dee and Elly discover that the word of a client can't always be trusted.
6	"Those Who Trespass Against Us"	Robert Marchand	Paula Milne	16 August 1994
Dee helps a househusband come to terms with his errant wife, while Elly goes back to university to reveal the tragedy behind the disappearance of a bright young student.

=== Series 2 (1995) ===
No.	Title	Directed by	Written by	British air date
1	"High Pressure"	Christopher King	Paula Milne	28 July 1995
Elly is under pressure to track down a stalker before he gets to her client Kate Phillips.
2	"The American Dream"	Christopher King	Paula Milne	4 August 1995
Elly does a little soul searching while she's trying to track down the agoraphobic wife of her latest client. Meanwhile, Kate is asked to spy on the secret lover of an American heiress.
3	"Money for Nothing"	Christopher King	Bill Gallagher	11 August 1995
Elly's new lover, Dr. Mark Judd, encourages her to investigate a factory accident, while Kate uncovers a case of blackmail.
4	"No Tomorrow"	Diana Patrick	Alma Cullen	18 August 1995
Kate's pursuit of a wayward publishing mogul turns into a murder investigation. Meanwhile, Elly is immersed in the tangled feelings of two women and a man involved in a surrogacy case, while she juggles the emotional demands made by her deepening relationship with Mark.
5	"Lost and Found"	Diana Patrick	Jacqueline Holborough	25 August 1995
Elly goes undercover among the homeless to flush out a philandering care-worker and finds herself forced to resort to blackmail. Kate wrestles with the riddle of a broken romance that goes back 30 years, while struggling to control the guilt brought on by her son's disappearance.
6	"End of Term"	Diana Patrick	Paula Milne	1 September 1995
An investigation into child snatch goes badly wrong and Elly has to draw on untapped resources when she learns at first hand what it is to be the victim of people who have nothing left to lose.
