= Misbourne School =

The Misbourne School

Location
- Misbourne Drive; Great Missenden, Buckinghamshire, HP16 0BN; England; 51.6985°N 0.7046°W

Information
- Type: Academy
- Motto: Inspiring Minds - Broadening Opportunities
- Established: 1956
- Local authority: Buckinghamshire
- Department for Education URN: 145322 Tables
- Ofsted: Reports
- Chair of Trustees: Kate Goodwin
- Headteacher: Rich Peters
- Gender: Coeducational
- Age: 11 to 18
- Enrolment: 1096
- Houses: Franklin (Green) Attenborough (Red) Turing (Yellow) Holmes (Blue)
- Colours: Navy and pale blue
- Website: http://www.themisbourne.co.uk

The Misbourne School is a coeducational secondary school and sixth form situated in Great Missenden, Buckinghamshire, England. Established in 1956, the school caters to students aged 11 to 18 and has approximately 1,096 pupils (2024), with 110 in sixth form. The school offers A-levels and BTEC qualifications.

== Academic performance ==
In the Ofsted report of 2022, The Misbourne maintained its 'Good' rating. Ofsted reported that the school's 'leadership of teaching and learning is a considerable strength' and noted that 'students are friendly, polite, courteous and conduct themselves exceptionally well in lessons and around the school' while 'principled and aspirational leadership embeds a culture of ambition which permeates the school'

The Misbourne improved its 5 A*-C GCSE performance from 72% in 2011. to 84% in 2012, placing the school in the top four upper schools in Buckinghamshire, to its highest ever result of 88% in 2013. In the sixth form, 99% of A level exams were passed, with 76% at A*-C and 41% A*-B. In 2019 the school reported its best ever GCSE results with 74% of pupils achieving a grade between 9 and 4 in English and Maths.

According to its 2013 Ofsted report, "The sixth form is good. Students’ attainment at both AS and A2 levels is improving. Sixth formers make good progress in their work related courses" Ofsted Report April 2013.

In 2022 the percentage of students who achieved a standard (9-4) pass in English and mathematics: 73%, percentage of students who achieved a strong pass (grade 5 or above) in English and maths at the end of KS4, 50%

== Facilities ==
Partly as a result of the school's specialist statuses in Arts and Technology, the school has several ICT rooms with computers for student use. In addition, there is a printing room where photographs can be processed and produced. (CAD).

The school canteen functions as a café, operated by a third-party company. The school also has tennis courts and large playing fields.

Recently the school has built an English block, giving students extra space.

Due to the new English block being built there was extra area for a new sixth-form study room this room includes an area for the students to study and relax in including computer suits and 'pods'.

The school's Performing Arts block was opened in 2004, in memory of former headmaster David Selman. It provides a small practise rooms for private music lessons and student use. The classrooms are all equipped with Casio keyboards. There is a dance studio and a recording studio equipped with music editing software. Sixth formers have access to their own private study area and ICT suite.

== History ==
The Misbourne was the first purpose-built secondary modern school in the country. The first pupils started at the school on 19 December 1955, although it did not officially open until 20 January 1956. Originally there were only twenty-five students.

The school celebrated its 50th anniversary in 2005/6. The celebrations culminated in a Jubilee summer fête in June 2006 which was attended by Cherie Blair.

The Misbourne School was rated the "friendliest school in Britain" in 2005, on Friends Reunited.

In September 2006 the Misbourne was awarded specialist school statuses in both Arts and Technology.

The Misbourne celebrated the first MizFest on 9 July 2012 students took part in music and drama performances, a fashion show, and workshops including fashion, cake baking, trampolining and Taiko drumming, with a performance by the community choir.

Rt Hon Cheryl Gillan MP, visited The Misbourne on Friday 14 March 2014.

On Wednesday 19 March 2014 former Misbourne student, Lieutenant Ian Bennett, "dropped in" to The Misbourne in a Merlin Mk 2 helicopter. Bennett came back to school to talk about his career in the Royal Navy, and invited some on board the helicopter.

Previously a community school administered by Buckinghamshire County Council, in January 2018 Misbourne School converted to academy status.

== Notable former pupils ==
- Jennifer Higham, actor
- Alex Kew, actor
- Alice Connor, actor
- Tom Helm, cricketer
- Dr Nighat Arif, doctor, broadcaster and writer
- Ann Gosling, actor
- James Cordon, actor (sixth form study)
