= Goodnight And I Wish* =

Goodnight And I Wish* is a musical project, created by co-founding member and drummer of Neils Children, Brandon Jacobs.

== The early days ==
Goodnight And I Wish* was formed in early 2007, and began life as an aid to help cure bouts of insomnia, suffered by Brandon, which is where the self invented genre description, Lullaby Pop was created. The name Goodnight And I Wish, is the title of an Altered Images album track, from the Pinky Blue album. Altered Images, were a big influence on Brandon at the time, as well as his other favourite bands such as The Cure, Aztec Camera, Syd Barret, The Coral, and 1960's psychedelic band July. Initially a solo project, early works were first uploaded to Myspace and received much attention from the worldwide fan base of Neils Children. Early shows included regular slots at London's most popular band nights, The Sect and Dice Club.

=== Releases ===
Brandon Jacobs released his debut solo E.P, ‘Dreams…Wishes & Fairy Tales’, on 5 May 2008. It was released on CD with 100 individually hand drawn and numbered sleeves on his own record label, Modern Pop Records. A full page write up was featured in the May edition of Artrocker Magazine, as well as an opening support slot for The Long Blondes at the Kentish Town Forum, having been asked to play by long-term friend, guitarist Dorian Cox.

"So Much For The British Summertime" was a free digital release, only available to download from the first day of the summer solstice 2008 through to winter solstice 2008. A promotional video was also shot by Emmaalouise Smith in various locations including Brighton beach and Brandon's back garden in Cheshunt.

On 2 February 2009, Goodnight And I Wish* self-released the download only single, 'If Tim Burton Wanted To', in time for Valentine's Day. Also with Brandon's own artwork, featuring two "Burton-esque" characters standing side by side, representing himself and long-term girlfriend, Emmaalouise Smith. Lyrically, the song is about the strange imaginary world that Brandon has created as a solo artist. The song features an earlier character from the song "My Pet Spider" as well as a haunted house, backed up by the line: "If Tim Burton wanted to, he could make a film about me and you....". Brandon also shot his own music video for the release, and released it via iTunes.

On 20 July 2009, debut album, "A Ruffled Mind Makes A Restless Pillow" was released. The title was a quote made famous by English novelist and poet Charlotte Brontë. This time, Brandon licensed the album out to Japanese independent record label, Vinyl Junkies. The UK release saw the 12 tracks split into two formats via mini 8-cm CD's, named "Sun" & "Moon", placed in black velvet bags. The album was to be a contrast between night and day, combining light hearted love songs, poems and Tea, put against fear, ghosts, witches and darker adaptations of the classic film "Freaks". The album release was celebrated with a release party at East London bar Cocomo, where Goodnight And I Wish* performed two contrasting sets, playing the album in its entirety. The Japanese release features three extra bonus tracks: 'Haly Horror', 'British Summertime' and 'Where Shall We Meet In Our Dreams?'. In 2010, after almost a year writing and recording, Goodnight And I Wish* released the single "Future Plans" on 22 November. It was an 'AA' single, alongside "Our Little Day Out". The single was released on limited edition vinyl and as a digital download on London based independent record label 'Tape'.

So far in 2011, Brandon has been regularly uploading new demos onto YouTube, which he has stated as being early works for forthcoming E.P and album releases.

==== Members ====
Brandon Jacobs was joined by Thomas Warren on bass guitar in 2009. Thomas had been bassist in Southend band Wretched Replica, and was also a roadie for Neils Children. When asked to perform at the 2009 Offset festival, the line up also included one-off member, Sarah McIntosh of The Good Natured as a backing vocalist and keyboard player. A more permanent member was then instated in the form off Kelly Thomas on keys, percussion and backing vocals. Then, guitarist David Strange, ex-Strange Idols guitarist added to the equation. Following this, in 2010, the line up was completed in the form of drummer Renu, but due to her own solo commitments, played her last show at the band's single launch for 'Future Plans' on Thursday 25 November 2010. In January 2011, Brandon asked fellow Neils Children member John Linger to fill in as drummer for Goodnight And I Wish*. John has since become a full-time member.

== Discography ==
=== E.P. ===
"Dreams, Wishes & Fairy Tales". (5 May 2008, Modern Pop Records. 100 limited edition CDs).

1. Heart Shaped Kite
2. Ghost
3. Butterfly Eye
4. My Little cat
5. Witches' Ceremony

=== Album ===
"A Ruffled Mind Makes A Restless Pillow". (20 July 2009, Modern Pop Records / Vinyl Junkies. CD & download)

UK release track listing:

"Sun"

1. An Exhibition Of Rarities
2. A Space In Time
3. The Rule Of Three
4. Come To Mine For Tea
5. My Pet Spider
6. Trophy Heart

"Moon"

1. Norlington Wirks
2. Suicide Letter
3. Ghost
4. Snow Angels
5. The Dream Catcher
6. If Tim Burton Wanted To

Japan release track listing:

1. An Exhibition Of Rarities
2. The Dream Catcher
3. The Rule Of Three
4. Snow Angels
5. A Space In Time
6. Norlington Works
7. Come To Mine For Tea
8. My Pet Spider
9. Suicide Letter
10. Ghost
11. If Tim Burton Wanted To...
12. Trophy Heart
13. Haly Horror (bonus track)
14. British Summertime (bonus track)
15. Where Shall We Meet In Our Dreams? (bonus track)

=== Singles ===
- "So Much For The British Summertime". (23 June 2008; digital release; Modern Pop Records).
- "If Tim Burton Wanted To". (2 February 2009; digital release; Modern Pop Records).
- "Future Plans / Our Little Day Out". (22 November 2010; vinyl and digital release; tape; Modern Pop Records).

=== Promotional films ===
- "So Much For The British Summertime". (2008; shot by Emmaalouise Smith).
- "The Dream Catcher - A Film of Un-Reality". (2008; shot by Emmaalouise Smith).
- "If Tim Burton Wanted To". (2009; shot by Brandon Jacobs).
- "Future Plans". (2010; shot by Emmaalouise Smith).
