= Krull (film) =

1983 film by Peter Yates

- Theatrical release poster
- Directed by: Peter Yates
- Written by: Stanford Sherman
- Produced by: Ron Silverman
- Starring: Ken Marshall; Lysette Anthony; Freddie Jones; Francesca Annis
- Cinematography: Peter Suschitzky
- Edited by: Ray Lovejoy
- Music by: James Horner
- Production companies: Columbia Pictures; Barclays Mercantile Industrial Finance Ltd.
- Distributed by: Columbia-EMI-Warner (UK)
- Release dates: 29 July 1983 (US); 27 December 1983 (UK)
- Running time: 121 minutes
- Country: United Kingdom
- Language: English
- Budget: $27-30 million
- Box office: $16.9 million

Krull is a 1983 British science-fantasy adventure film directed by Peter Yates and distributed by Columbia Pictures. It stars Ken Marshall, Lysette Anthony, Freddie Jones, Francesca Annis, David Battley and Alun Armstrong. Liam Neeson and Robbie Coltrane, still early in their film careers, appear in supporting roles. The story follows Prince Colwyn (Marshall) and a fellowship of companions who set out to rescue his bride, Princess Lyssa (Anthony), from a fortress of alien invaders who have arrived on their home planet.

Development on the film began in 1980, when Columbia Pictures President Frank Price gave producer Ron Silverman the idea to produce a fantasy film. Krull was shot in England at Pinewood Studios and on-location in Italy and Spain. Nick Maley designed the creature and prosthetic makeup effects seen in the film. The film score was composed by James Horner and performed by the London Symphony Orchestra.

Krull was released in the United States on 29 July 1983, and in the United Kingdom later that December. The film was a box-office bomb upon release, and critical opinion has been mixed, both upon release and in retrospect. Reviewers have highlighted its visual effects and soundtrack, while others have criticized its plot as being derivative and nonsensical. However, in the years since its release, the film has developed a cult following.

== Plot ==
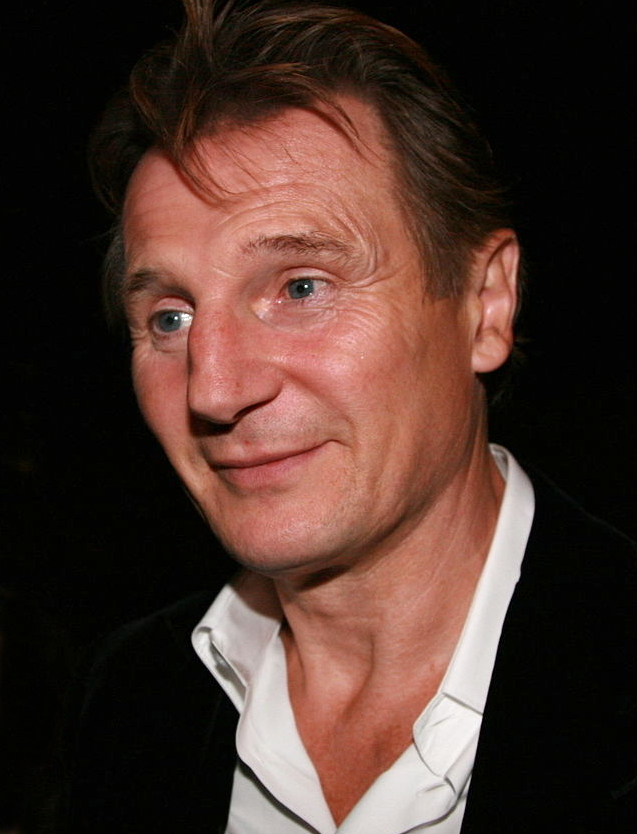
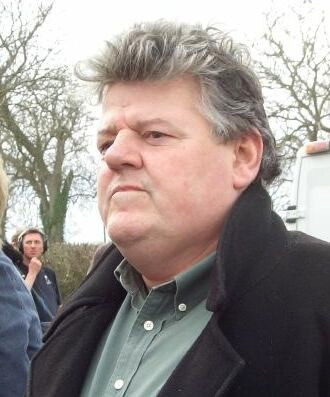
Krull includes early screen performances of Liam Neeson and Robbie Coltrane as bandits.

The entity known as the Beast and his army of Slayers travel the galaxy in a mountain-like spaceship called the Black Fortress, intent on enslaving the planet Krull, as he has done to many other worlds. Ynyr recites the prophecy that was given for him to know:

"A girl of ancient name shall become queen. She shall choose a king, and together they shall rule our world, and their son shall rule the galaxy."

Prince Colwyn and Princess Lyssa plan to marry in the hope that their two kingdoms' combined forces can defeat the Beast's army. However, the Slayers attack before the wedding is completed, devastating the native Krull armies, wounding Colwyn, and kidnapping Lyssa.

Colwyn is nursed back to health by Ynyr, the Old One. Ynyr tells Colwyn that the Beast can be defeated with the Glaive, an ancient, magical, five-pointed weapon resembling a large throwing star with retractable blades.^{[a]} Colwyn retrieves the Glaive from a mountain cave, and sets out to find the Black Fortress, which teleports to a new location every sunrise. As they travel, Colwyn and Ynyr are joined by the magician Ergo "the Magnificent" and a band of nine thieves and fighters — Torquil, Kegan, Rhun, Oswyn, Bardolph, Menno, Darro, Nennog, and Quain. The cyclops Rell later joins the group.

Colwyn's group travels to the home of the Emerald Seer and his apprentice, Titch. The Emerald Seer uses a crystal to view where the Fortress will teleport next, but the Beast remotely crushes the crystal with magic. The group travels to a swamp that the Beast's magic cannot penetrate, but Darro is lost to a Slayer attack, and Menno to quicksand. A changeling agent of the Beast kills the Emerald Seer and assumes its victim's form, but the agent is discovered and killed by Rell and Colwyn.

Another changeling is instructed by the Beast to seduce Colwyn. This is meant to convince Lyssa that Colwyn does not love her. However, he rejects the changeling's advances, and Lyssa – witnessing this through a vision provided by the Beast — affirms that love triumphs over might. The Beast, though, forces her to consider marrying him so that he will halt the Slayers' attacks.

Ynyr leaves the group to seek the Widow of the Web, an enchantress who loved Ynyr long ago and was exiled to the lair of the Crystal Spider for murdering their only child. The Widow reveals where the Black Fortress will be at sunrise. She also gives Ynyr the sand of an enchanted hourglass to keep the Crystal Spider at bay and the injured Ynyr alive. As the Crystal Spider attacks the Widow, Ynyr returns to the group to reveal the location of the Black Fortress. As he speaks, he loses the last of the sand and dies.

The group captures and rides magical Fire Mares to reach the Black Fortress. The Slayers at the Fortress kill Rhun, while Rell sacrifices himself to hold open the crushing spaceship doors long enough to allow the others to enter. Quain, Nennog, and Kegan are killed as they make their way through the fortress. Ergo transforms into a tiger to save Titch from a Slayers' attack. Colwyn, Torquil, Bardolph, and Oswyn are trapped inside a large dome. The latter three fall through an opening and are trapped between walls studded with huge spikes, which kill Bardolph.

Colwyn breaches the dome and finds Lyssa. He attacks the Beast with the Glaive, which becomes embedded in the Beast's body. With nothing to defend themselves, Lyssa and Colwyn quickly finish their wedding ritual. This gives them the power to manipulate fire, with which Colwyn slays the Beast. The Beast's death frees Torquil and Oswyn, and they rejoin Colwyn, Lyssa, Ergo and Titch. The survivors make their way out of the crumbling fortress, which is pulled into space.

As the heroes return home, Ynyr repeats the prophecy that the son of the queen and king shall rule the galaxy.

== Cast ==
- Ken Marshall as Colwyn, a prince who wields sword, dagger, and the Glaive.
- Lysette Anthony as Lyssa
  - Lindsay Crouse as Lyssa (voice re-dub, uncredited)
- Freddie Jones as Ynyr, who is also the narrator.
- Alun Armstrong as Torquil, leader of a troop of bandits.
- David Battley as Ergo, who shapeshifts into animals.
- Bernard Bresslaw as Rell the Cyclops, who wields a large trident.
- Liam Neeson as Kegan, Torquil's axe-wielding, jovial polygamist.
- Dicken Ashworth as Bardolph, Torquil's dagger-wielding bandit.
- Todd Carty as Oswyn, Torquil's staff-wielding bandit.
- Robbie Coltrane as Rhun, Torquil's spear-wielding bandit.
  - Michael Elphick as Rhun (voice re-dub, uncredited)
- John Welsh as Seer
- Graham McGrath as Titch, the Seer's young apprentice.
- Tony Church as Turold, Colwyn's father.
- Bernard Archard as Eirig, Lyssa's father.
- Belinda Mayne as Vella, Merith's friend.
- Clare McIntyre as Merith, one of Kegan's many wives.
- Francesca Annis as Widow of the Web, whose true name is Lyssa
- Bronco McLoughlin as Nennog, of Torquil's troop.

== Production ==
=== Development and writing ===
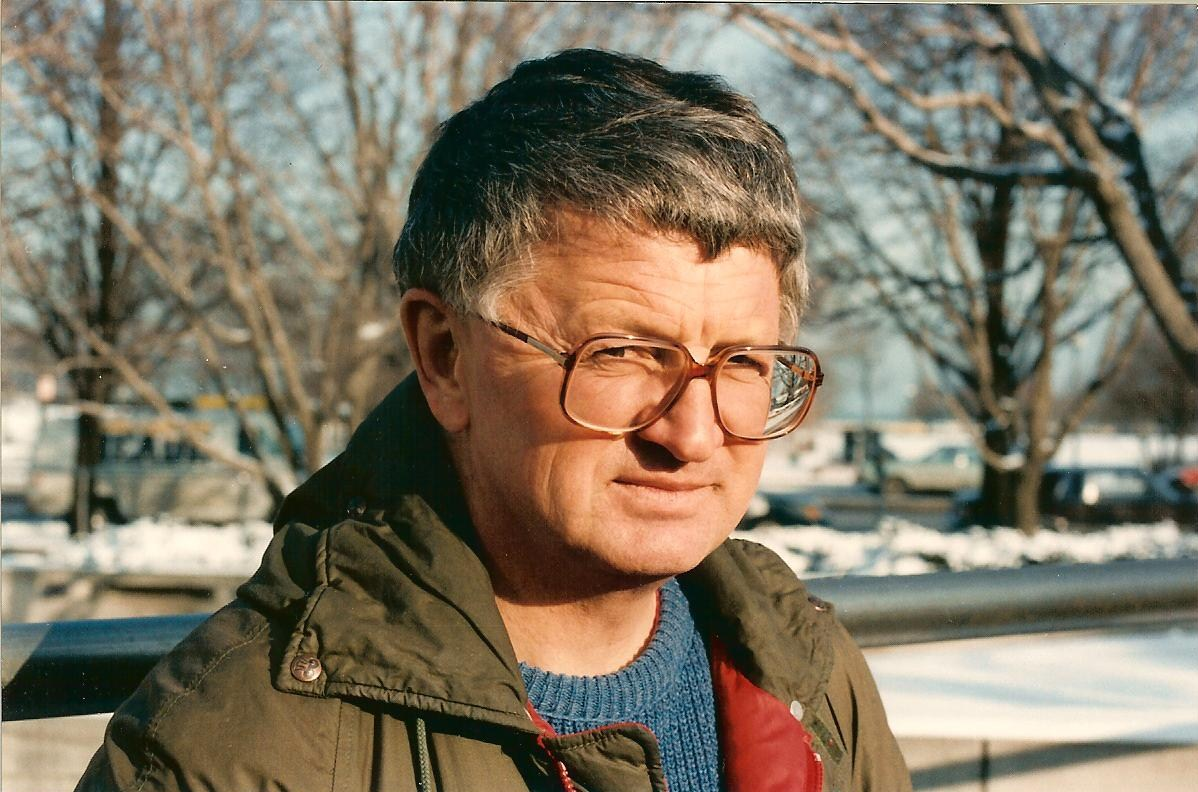
Steve Tesich was hired to write a "second version" of the screenplay for Krull that was later discarded.

In 1980, Columbia Pictures president Frank Price asked producer Ron Silverman to create a fantasy film inspired by Dungeons and Dragons Silverman stated, "Frank Price said to us 'how would you like to do a movie based on Dungeons and Dragons?'" Silverman agreed to do so and hired Stanford Sherman to work on the screenplay. Sherman wrote the "bare bones" of the plot and Columbia quickly approved it. While the essence of the plot was never altered during development and production, the first draft of the film was titled The Dragons of Krull, where the Beast was initially planned to be a dragon; however, the creators changed the Beast to a more "reptilian" creature for the final film, leading to the final title Krull. Also a monstrous snake woman was cut because of similarities with Medusa in Clash of the Titans, which had been released just a couple of years earlier.

Steve Tesich was brought in to write a "second version" of the script. Tesich's version of the screenplay was discarded as dialogue-heavy and lacking in special effects, so the first script was used and re-edited instead. There was one point in the writing process where it was planned that Lyssa would turn into the antagonist near the end of the story, but this was not part of the final screenplay, given that the production team didn't want her to be "less than pure". Lysette Anthony, the actress who played Lyssa, explained that she "thought that was a little boring".

After the first draft was finished, the writing and production team considered Peter Yates to direct the film. Two months after they asked him to join the project and after he finished directing Eyewitness (1981), Yates read the screenplay of The Dragons of Krull. He was "intrigued" with what he read and accepted the position of directing the film as a "challenge". He reasoned in a 1983 interview that Krull would be one of those rare films that "can take full advantage of today's special effects techniques" and would differ from his more realistic previous works in that he would have to make the movie entirely based on his imagination. The film was in a year of pre-production, which involved Sherman editing the script, Yates creating storyboards, Stephen B. Grimes and Derek Meddings coming up with set concepts, and Ken Marshall and Anthony being cast as Colwyn and Lyssa, respectively. Because the expensive sets had already been built and were based on the screenplay by Steve Tesich, Sherman had to adapt his original script to fit the sets.

=== Filming ===
Yates described making Krull as "complicated" and "just so enormous". Special effects artist Brian Johnson stated in a 2009 interview that Yates hated working on the film so much that in the middle of shooting, he took a vacation to the Caribbean, which led to the special effects artists taking a three-week break from the project. The production was initially arranged to be shot at several locations because Krull was first planned as a medieval-style motion picture. As it went through multiple drafts, the screenplay transformed into entirely fantasy, which meant most of the film would be shot on sound stages, and only a minority of the sequences would be filmed in actual locations in Italy, Spain, and England for only a few weeks. A total of 23 huge sets were built and the film was shot at more than ten sound stages at Pinewood Studios. Krull was an expensive film to produce, with a budget of $30 million. Marshall and Meddings reasoned that the huge budget was due to several changes of concepts in the script that led the designers to have to repeatedly alter the designs of the sets.

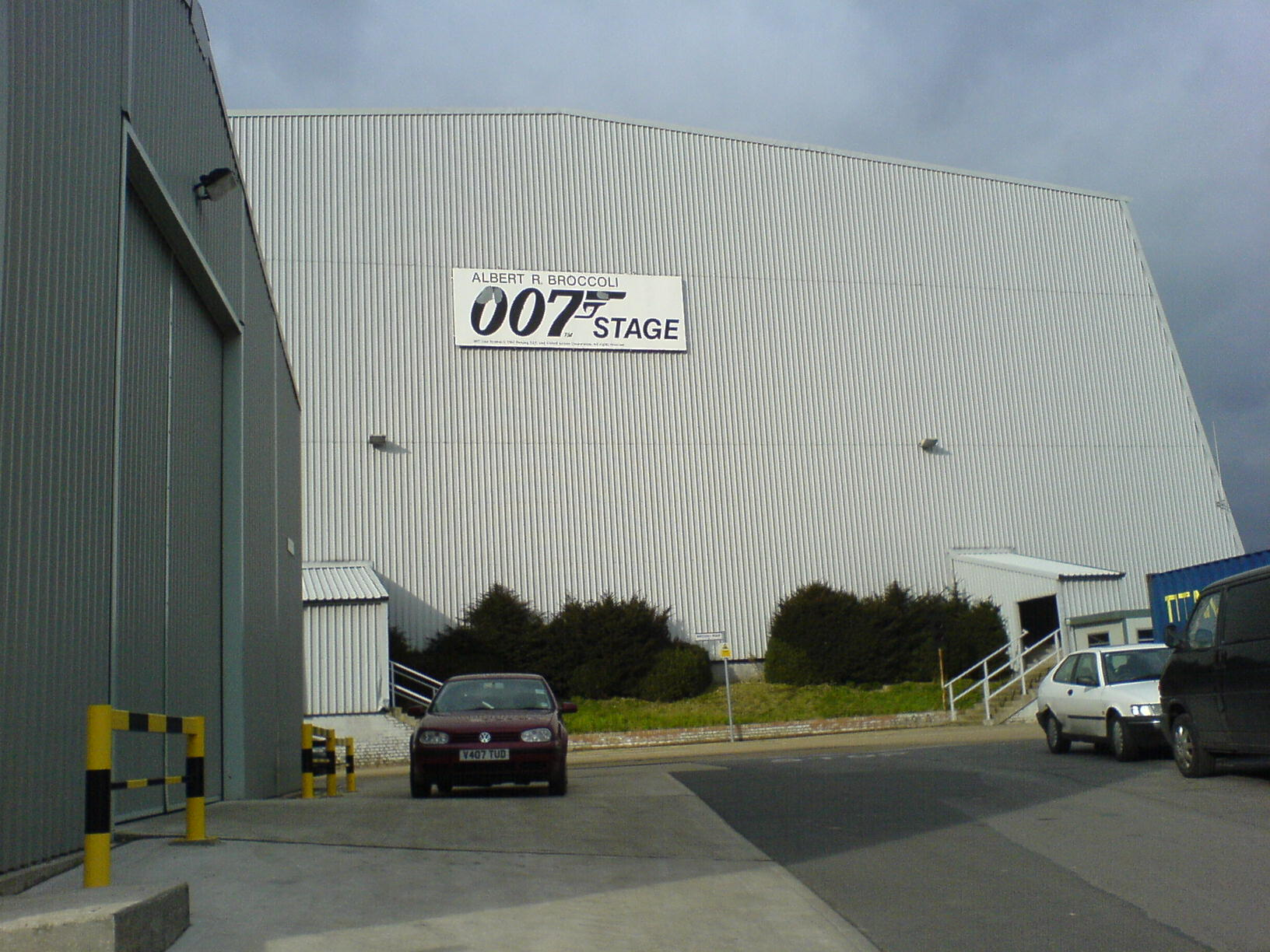
Pinewood's 007 Stage (pictured in 2006), one of the largest sound stages in the world, was used for the swamp setting of Krull.

Filming began on 25 January 1983. The first sequence shot was the scene where Ynyr (Freddie Jones) climbs a huge spider web in order to confront the Widow of the Web. Jones did not use any safety wires because the wires would have been visible. Stop-motion animator Steve Archer spent two weeks creating the first model of the spider in the scene, which was later changed. The spider was made of plexiglass, with solid legs and a hollow abdomen, and eight black eyes made of plastic.

Yates's direction of the action scenes that take place at the beginning of Krull was inspired by swashbuckler films such as Captain Blood (1935). However, he wanted to figure out new weapons that gave the scenes a unique swashbuckling feel. Marshall practiced his moves for the sequences a week before filming began. However, by the time shooting of these scenes started, the costumes for the Slayers were recently finished, so much of the fight choreography was altered at the last minute based on the limitations of the costumes.

Pinewood's 007 Stage, one of the largest sound stages in the world, was used for the swamp scene, wherein the Slayers and several changelings encounter Colwyn and his group. Yates described the swamp set as "quite nasty ... we always had people bumping into things." It was filmed during what Marshall described as a "very harsh winter", and the set was too big to be entirely heated, leading to the actors feeling cold and exhausted. The crew members had a hard time seeing through the mist, which led to them accidentally getting into water that consisted of "cork chips".

Rehearsing the scene where Colwyn and his group are being chased by the Slayers in the Black Fortress involved stuntmen taking the part of Colwyn so that Marshall could conserve energy for filming. The scene involved Colwyn and his men encountering a corridor where the floor opened underneath them via two set pieces "the size of a small house" that were powered by liquid and broke apart before quickly slamming back together. Marshall explained that doing the sequence gave him nightmares after it was completed. When shooting of the scene began, Marshall took more time to say his lines than the production crew expected, leading to him not making it from the tunnel in the first take. Only one crew member noticed this and was able to stop the machines controlling the pieces, but Marshall "knew that if the machine didn't stop in five seconds, [he] would be dead". Another take of the sequence was shot the next day with Yates instructing that the speed of the machine be slower. However, Marshall insisted on the machine being sped up and, in the final take, was successful in getting away from the set pieces. Marshall explained, "I had no feeling in my heel for months afterward. It was really hard doing stunts afterwards, too."

=== Special effects ===
Meddings led the special effects department of Krull. British artist Christopher Tucker was also originally in the project but left due to creative differences. Nick Maley and his crew produced several effects six weeks before filming began. The effects department often went for challenging visual effects and designs that were unusual to achieve in the early 1980s. Meddings described how the special effects were made for the movie:

It was a hard show in terms of effects. Whenever you do an effects picture, you try to come up with something new. Unfortunately, you don't always succeed. You may think you've done something amazing, but, ultimately, it's up to the audience for that verdict. We really worked ourselves silly on this one, though.

Meddings created miniatures for the setting of the film's titular planet. The model Meddings constructed for Lyssa's castle was twenty feet high. Shots of it were done in Italy using forced perspective to make it look taller than it really was. The model of the Black Fortress was twelve feet high, and an electrical system was used to create the light within it. Because the Black Fortress disintegrates at the end of the film, it was constructed "like a jigsaw puzzle with parts able to be pulled apart on cue."

In Krull, Ergo uses his magic to transform into creatures such as puppies and geese. Meddings used an effects strategy that showed these transformations differently from traditional cross dissolve methods, reasoning that it had "been done to death". He explained:

We did it with a series of blow-ups embellished with artwork so that you could actually blend in the actor. The actor [David Battley] dropped down to his knees and we used a series of blow-ups to reduce him to puppy size. Then, halfway through the transition, we introduced blowups of the puppy, blending the two sets together with artwork. Then, as the last still went on screen, we substituted the real dog who just wagged his tail and walked away. It was a trick, but it looks quite magical.

The character Rell the Cyclops was designed by Nick Maley. Prosthetic makeup covered Bernard Bresslaw's eyes while a radio controlled the character's "solo" eyeball on his forehead. Bresslaw was only able to look through one eye hole while in costume; he explained how, during the swamp scene, the other actors had to protect him from walking into the swamp.

Twenty-three pieces of "aging" prosthetics were applied to Francesca Annis' face for her role as Lyssa, the Widow of the Web.

=== Voice casting ===
Lysette Anthony's voice was re-dubbed for her character Lyssa by the uncredited American actress Lindsay Crouse as the producers wanted the Princess to have a more mature-sounding voice. Robbie Coltrane's voice was dubbed over by an uncredited Michael Elphick.

== Soundtrack ==
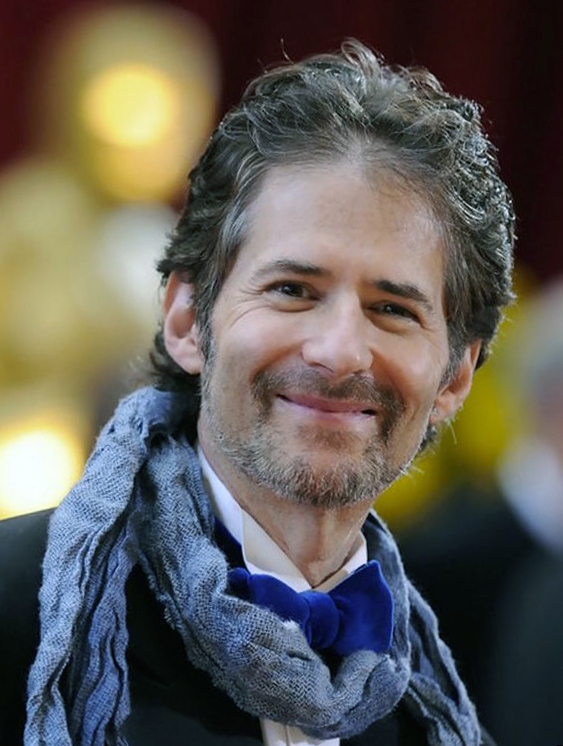
James Horner scored Krull.

The film score was composed by James Horner and performed by the London Symphony Orchestra and the Ambrosian Singers. It has been commended as part of the composer's best early efforts. The soundtrack is considered a high point of the film. Ryan Lambie, reviewing for Den of Geek wrote, "The 70s and 80s seemed to be the era of great sci-fi and fantasy themes, and Horner's is high up on the list of the best, providing the film a grandiose sweep to match the broad vistas of Krull's location photography."

The score features traditional swashbuckling fanfares, an overtly rapturous love theme, and other musical elements that were characteristic of fantasy and adventure films of the 1980s, along with incorporating avant-garde techniques with string instruments to represent some of the monstrous creatures. Additionally, to accompany the main antagonists, the Beast and its army of Slayers, Horner utilised Holst-like rhythms and groaning and moaning vocals from the choir. Also of note is a recurring "siren call" performed by female voices that starts and bookends the score, and appears numerous times in the story to represent the legacy of the ancient world of Krull.

Horner's score is reminiscent of earlier works, particularly Battle Beyond the Stars and Star Trek II: The Wrath of Khan. Some segments would be used for the ambiance of the Disneyland Paris attraction Space Mountain: Mission 2.

The score has been released numerous times on album by various labels. The first was a 45-minute condensed edition released by Southern Cross Records in 1987, featuring most of the major action cues, three renditions of the love theme, and the music from the end credits; however, music from the main title sequence was omitted. Southern Cross Records later released special editions in 1992 and 1994 (the latter a Gold disc), expanding on the previously released tracks, featuring the main title music and other action cues.

In 1998, Super Tracks released the complete recorded score in a two-CD set with elaborate packaging and extensive liner notes by David Hirsch. In 2010, La-La Land Records re-issued the Super Tracks album, with two bonus cues and new liner notes by Jeff Bond in a limited edition of 3,000 copies, which sold out within less than a year. La-La Land reissued an additional 2,000 copies of the album in 2015.

=== Tracks ===
==== Southern Cross Records (1983 vinyl) ====
===== A-Side =====
1. "Riding the Fire Mares" (5:24)
2. "Slayer's Attack" (9:22)
3. "Widow's Web" (6:20)
4. "Colwyn and Lyssa (Love Theme)" (2:36)

===== B-Side =====
1. "Battle on the Parapets" (2:32)
2. "The Widow's Lullaby" (5:10)
3. "Destruction of the Black Fortress" (8:40)
4. "Epilogue and End Credits" (4:48)

==== Expanded edition (1992 CD) ====
1. Krull Main Title and Colwyn's Arrival (7:34)
2. The Slayers Attack (9:17)
3. Quest for the Glaive (7:22)
4. The Seer's Vision (2:17)
5. "The Battle in the Swamp" (2:40)
6. Quicksand (3:37)
7. Leaving the Swamp (1:59)
8. The Widow's Web (6:17)
9. Colwyn and Lyssa Love Theme (2:34)
10. The Widow's Lullaby (5:01)
11. Ynyr's Death (1:39)
12. Ride of the Fire Mares (5:21)
13. Battle on the Parapets (2:52)
14. Inside the Black Fortress (6:14)
15. Death of the Beast and Destruction of the Black Fortress (8:33)
16. Epilogue and End Credits (4:52)

==== La-La-Land Records (2010 album) ====
===== Disc 1 =====
1. Main Title and Colwyn's Arrival (7:34)
2. The Slayers Attack (9:18)
3. Quest for the Glaive (7:23)
4. Ride to the Waterfall (0:53)
5. Lyssa in the Fortress (1:28)
6. The Walk to the Seer's Cave (4:10)
7. The Seer's Vision (2:18)
8. The Battle in the Swamp (2:39)
9. Quicksand (3:38)
10. The Changeling (4:04)
11. Leaving the Swamp (1:58)

===== Disc 2 =====
1. Vella (3:46)
2. The Widow's Web (6:18)
3. The Widow's Lullaby (5:01)
4. Ynyr's Death (1:41)
5. Ride of the Firemares (5:22)
6. Battle on the Parapets (2:53)
7. Inside the Black Fortress (6:13)
8. The Death of the Beast and The Destruction of the Black Fortress (8:31)
9. Epilogue and End Title (4:52)
10. Colwyn and Lyssa Love Theme (2:35)
11. The Walk to the Seer's Cave (Album Edit) (2:16)
12. Theme from Krull (4:48)

== Reception ==
=== Box office ===
In the United States and Canada, Krull grossed $16.9 million at the box office, against a reported budget of $27–30 million.

=== Critical response ===
On the review aggregator website Rotten Tomatoes, 35% of 26 critics' reviews are positive, with an average rating of 4.4/10. The website's consensus reads: "While nostalgic fans may view it through rose-Krullered glasses, this would-be sci-fi epic is painfully derivative." Metacritic, which uses a weighted average, assigned the film a score of 45 out of 100, based on 10 critics, indicating "mixed or average" reviews. Audiences polled by CinemaScore gave the film an average grade of "C+" on an A+ to F scale.

Variety called Krull a "blatantly derivative hodgepodge of Excalibur meets Star Wars." They conclude that the "professionalism of director Peter Yates, the large array of production and technical talents and, particularly, the mainly British actors keep things from becoming genuinely dull or laughable." Roger Ebert and Gene Siskel, reviewing Krull on their show At the Movies, gave the film two thumbs down and called it "one of the most boring, nonsensical, illogical fantasies in a long time."

Christopher John reviewed Krull in Ares Magazine #16 and commented that "It is a hot, hollow wind which only reminds us of what a pleasant breeze feels like, and angers us because it isn't one." Colin Greenland reviewed Krull for Imagine magazine, and stated that "If as much attention had been paid to the plot as to the visuals, instead of all this 'It is the time. I/we must go/stay alone/together' stuff, perhaps it wouldn't be so hard to care what happens next."

John Nubbin reviewed Krull for Different Worlds magazine and stated that "With the advent of home video [...] more and more rotten films will be going down the tube quicker as people wait for them to come on HBO, or in rentable form. Until that day comes, though, when every movie produced for theaters is treat, because they cannot afford to make a mistake, films like Krull will continue to be made."

Critic Janet Maslin found Krull to be "a gentle, pensive sci-fi adventure film that winds up a little too moody and melancholy for the Star Wars set" and praised director Yates for "giving the film poise and sophistication, as well as a distinctly British air." Baird Searles described Krull as "an unpretentious movie ... with a lot of good things going for it."

=== Retrospective response ===
Despite its critical and box office failure, the film has gained a cult following over the years.

A 2017 review by AllMovie journalist Jason Buchanan hailed it as "an ambitious sci-fi/fantasy that even in its failures can usually be forgiven for its sheer sense of bravado." Ryan Lambie, reviewing for Den of Geek in 2011, called it "among the most visually creative and downright fun movies of the enchanted 80s" and "an entire galaxy away from other cheap, quickly made knock-offs that showed up in the wake of Star Wars." In a 2006 retrospective, PopMatters critic Bill Gibron found many problems with Krull, but noted that it had an "amusement amalgamation" rare for a film released in the early 1980s, where "if you don't like one particular character or circumstance, just wait – something completely different is just around the corner." He summarized that it's "the perfect pick up film – a movie you can catch in snatches while it plays on some pay cable channel. No matter what point you come in on the story, no matter what sort of scene is playing out before you, the lack of continuity and context actually allows you to take pleasure in the individual moment, and if so inclined, to stick around for another exciting sample in just a few minutes." Writing about the film in 2009, Eric D. Snider summarized, "against all odds, Krull crams itself with magic, fantasy, and heroic quests, yet still manages to be boring. This is an impressive feat in and of itself. You'd almost have to be doing it on purpose."

=== Cinematography ===
A common critical praise of Krull was the visuals and special effects, Lambie describing them as "quite captivating". Buchanan wrote, "Even if it does seem overly familiar at times there is just enough originality injected into the visualization of the film that it's hard to dismiss it as just another Star Wars clone." Searles called the film "very beautiful, in fact, a neglected quality in these days when it seems to have been forgotten that film is a visual medium". Entertainment Weekly stated that Krull "had visual imagination to spare, including its sequences of flame-hoofed horses and a particularly scary pre-LOTR segment with a giant spider." Lambie called the Glaive "one of the coolest fantasy armaments of the decade", while Buchanan described it as "highly original". However, Lawrence Watt-Evans disliked the weapon's name. He explained that an actual glaive was a "sort of pole-arm, a long stick with a long blade on the end" and not a "brass starfish". He stated that while "glaive" was a vague term and there wasn't an actual word that defined the weapon, "the writer should have made [another name] up rather than borrowing one which doesn't fit."

The effects have also garnered detractors. The House Next Door critic Steven Boone stated that Krull "stands out because it has some of the clunkiness and uncertain production design of a cheapie like Beastmaster, but its visuals fairly pulse like something from the Spielberg–Lucas realm". Gibron wrote that the film doesn't have "the polished level of visuals that fans were used to (thanks to American companies like ILM)". In a 2001 DVD Talk review, Gil Jawetz called the effects "totally fake and funny" like most other 1980s films. Ian Nathan, in a 2015 Empire magazine piece, wrote that they "may have satisfied young boys at the time but have become frail and silly with age". He was especially critical towards the visuals of the ending, labeling them as "all too derivative", lacking "polish", and only "mildly distracting". However, Nathan also noted that the film did present some interesting designs and concepts, including doppelgängers that sneak into Colwyn's gang and a witch named The Widow of the Web trapped in "the heart of a web".

=== Screenplay ===
A frequent criticism in multiple reviews of Krull is of its writing. Lambie believed that Krull is "perhaps a little too derivative to earn a place in the major league of 80s fantasy movies". Gibron described Krull as a "forgettable battle between good, evil and a strange circular weapon", stating that its "confusing mythology left many an intended audience member scratching their adolescent head". This "confusing mythology" included the "dopey reasons" for the story's essential characters dying and parts of the story that "got lost inside all manner of interstellar/medieval malarkey". Writer Annie Frisbie opined that the film's representation of the relationship between Colwyn and Lyssa was "way too vague", reasoning that "the dialogue between Colwyn and Lyssa is so generic that it doesn't come close to achieving that odd blend of universality and intimacy that makes love stories sing". Snider described Krull as a "film that dares you not to laugh at it", opining that "its plot reads like an oral report on Lord of the Rings given by a student who hasn't read the book". Snider described one major problem in the film's writing:

We're constantly told that there's only ONE WAY! to do something, and that it's VERY DANGEROUS!, and then when the characters fail to do it there's suddenly ANOTHER WAY! that is also VERY DANGEROUS! And if that way fails, too, you can bet there will be YET ANOTHER WAY! to do the thing that there was originally only ONE WAY! to do. To use a screenwriting metaphor, this is like painting yourself into a corner and then avoiding stepping on the fresh paint by suddenly developing the ability to levitate.

Many aspects of the plot—such as magical abilities, wizards, lands, and other individuals on Krull—are only mentioned by the characters but never elaborated, which was both praised and criticized in Watt-Evans's review of the film. He liked that it made the viewer have to solve mysteries on his own and gave the film "believability". However, he was dismayed by one scene in the film where Lyssa sees a projected image of the Beast murdering a girl: "We see the image of the girl die and vanish, but I would have liked a look at that directly, rather than through the image. How did it look to the people around the girl? Did she vanish, as the image did, or was there a body?" He described this part of the film as a "missed ... opportunity", reasoning that "such a scene would have told us something about the Beast's power, and the reactions of the people watching might have been informative, as well". He said Krull "drags in spots", such as in the moments Colwyn and his gang climb mountains, and described the film's ending as "singularly lacking in surprises". However, Lambie praised the ending for being the most exciting part of the film as well as "surprisingly harsh, with Colwyn losing allies at every turn. The Star Wars franchise never despatched quite so many characters in such a graphic manner."

=== Characters and performances ===
Responses to the characters and performances of Krull were varied. Some critics praised the antagonists of the film. Watt-Evans highlighted the Slayers' "cleverly designed double-ended weapons which provide some nice special effects and make for wonderfully chaotic battle scenes". He also noted they squeal and glow before they break apart when they get stabbed, describing such scenes as "quite alien and frightening". Lambie praised the Slayers' "ominous silhouette of their armour, and the worm-like creature that erupts from them when they're defeated, make them far less derivative than they may otherwise have been". Buchanan described the Slayers as "truly horrific", calling their death screams a "memorable touch", and labeled the Beast as being pulled "straight from the darkest of fairy tales".

The Aurum Film Encyclopedia expressed admiration for the "engaging characters who surround the pallid hero and heroine" and also called the action scenes "nicely judged". Lambie called the characters "flat", Gibron said that the acting "seemed pitched just a tad too high for the relatively low brow material", while Buchanan described Marshall's performance as Colwyn as "somewhat wooden". Jawetz opined that "Marshall, who looks like the lovechild of Patrick Swayze and Bruce McCulloch, is not quite tough enough to pull off his warrior role, but the supporting cast seems more solid." Lambie praised David Battley's performance as Ergo, while Justine Elias, another journalist for The House Next Door, called Battley's character "awful", elaborating that "even the dullest child would find this unfunny. I pitied Ken Marshall when he was forced to react with hearty ha-ha-has to every crap magic trick."

== Accolades ==
- Nominee Best Fantasy Film — Saturn Awards
- Nominee Best Music (James Horner) — Saturn Awards
- Nominee Best Costumes (Anthony Mendleson) — Saturn Awards
- Nominee Grand Prize (Peter Yates) — Avoriaz International Fantastic Film Festival
- Won Worst Picture — Stinkers Bad Movie Awards

== Merchandise ==
=== Book ===
A novelization was written by Alan Dean Foster. A comic book adaptation by writer David Michelinie and artists Bret Blevins and Vince Colletta was published by Marvel Comics, both as Marvel Super Special No. 28 with behind-the-scenes material from the film, and as a two-issue limited series.

== Legacy ==
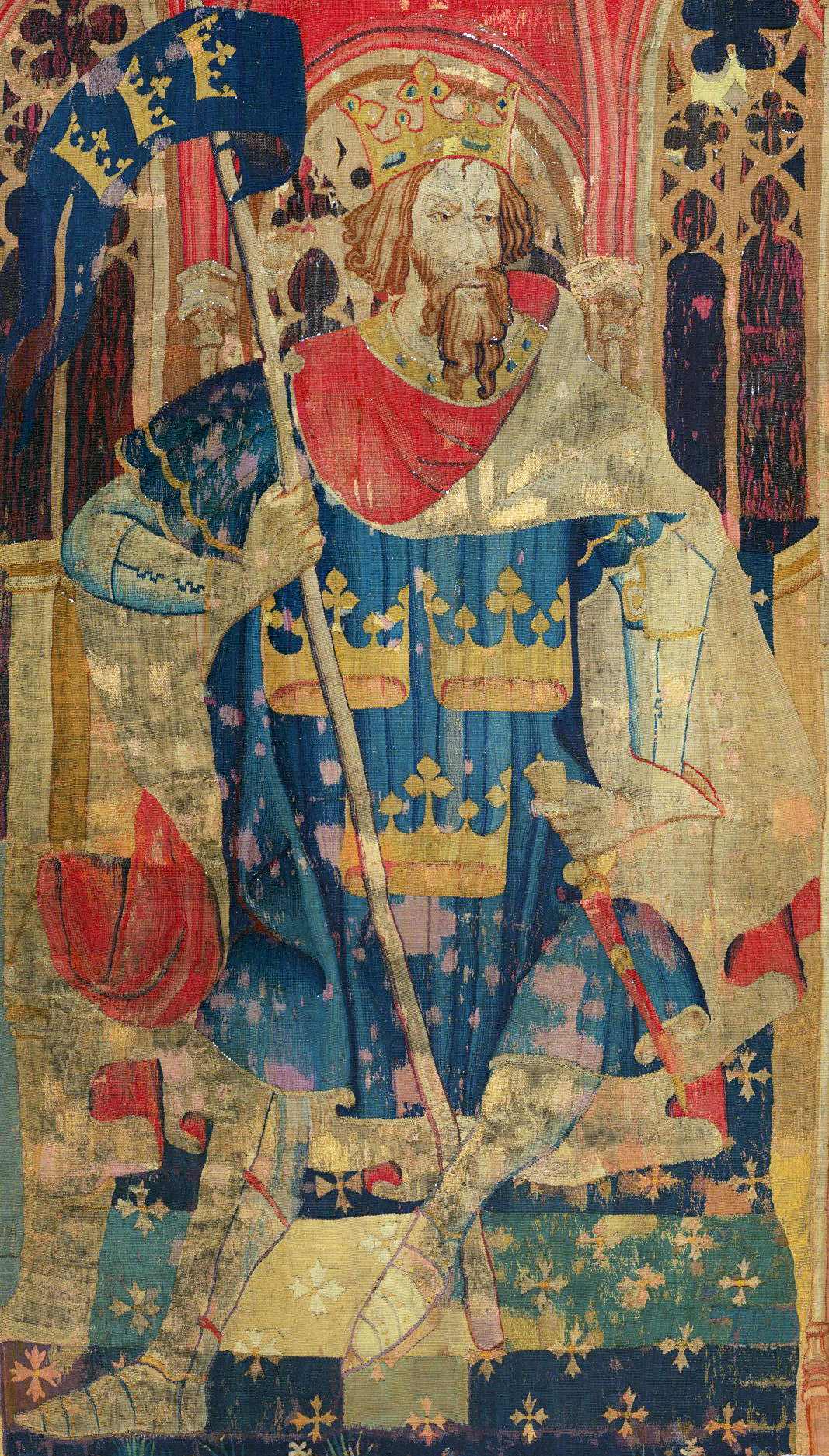
In addition to Star Wars and The Lord of the Rings, the plot of Krull has also been compared to the legends of King Arthur.

Combining elements of sword and sorcery and the space opera genre, Krull has a plot compared by critics to the works in the series of Star Wars, The Lord of the Rings, and, for its use of the Glaive, the legend of King Arthur. Watt-Evans explained that the Glaive is "just there, waiting for the right man to come and wield it". Though most of the characters say they know about the myths of the Glaive, they never reveal these stories to Colwyn before he obtains the weapon. He wrote, "Do any of the stories ever bother to explain who forged Excalibur, or how? No, it's just there, waiting for Arthur to come and get it. Similarly, the Glaive is just there, waiting for Colwyn."

Watt-Evans analogized the look, story, and vibe of Krull as a superior version of The Dark Crystal (1982). He described the film's settings:

Basically medieval in appearance, Krull has a sort of streamlined look in places, as if perhaps its civilization is more technologically advanced than it appears on the surface. The Black Fortress and everything connected with it has a broken, vaguely organic look to it, as if it were grown instead of built — and then cut to shape where it hadn't grown right. The interior is quite weird, and seems to be constantly shifting to suit the whims of the Beast.

Yates's concept for Krull was "sort of a fairy storybook that moves; a fairy tale with a life, a reality of its own. I very much wanted to make a movie with some old-fashioned romance to it, yet a movie where things always moved." Watt-Evans, categorizing Krull as a fairy tale, noted the film to be mythic to the point of making "no attempt at realism". He analyzed, "Lyssa and Colwyn, despite having apparently arranged the marriage for political reasons, fall madly in love at first sight." He continued, "although we're told that the Slayers have been burning villages, we never see a village, burned or otherwise." He wrote that establishing shots of castles show no residents or plot-unrelated extras passing by; this was an indication that the lands of Krull do not have an economic system or population, which was appropriate given that "it's traditional for the heroes of fairy tales to be unbothered by such necessities as food and shelter." He wrote that not much about the background of the characters is revealed, because "this is not a film that explores the innermost secrets of the human heart, it's a glorious fairy tale for both adults and children."

None of the characters who live on Krull explain the magical powers they use every day. Watt-Evans wrote that this lack of explanation "helps one to accept that these people are real people, living in a real world". He reasoned that magic powers are Krull's equivalent of automobiles: "in a movie set on Earth, does anyone bother to explain cars? No, they're just there. For Krull, magic is as much a part of the everyday world as automobiles are for us."

Justin K. Thompson, director of Spider-Man: Across the Spider-Verse, revealed that the spider in the web scene was an influence on the design of the spider in Go Home Machine, which is also named after the character Ynyr.

=== In popular culture ===
- A scene in the 2003 romantic comedy How to Lose a Guy in 10 Days shows Matthew McConaughey's character referring to his member as "Krull, the Warrior King".
- The 2001 PC role-playing game Arcanum: Of Steamworks and Magick Obscura features a powerful throwing weapon called Azram's Star, which is modeled directly after the glaive from the film.
- The Krull glaive makes an appearance by intermittently floating up out of the lava in the tunnels preceding the Onyxia boss encounter in the 2004 MMO video game World of Warcraft.
- In the American Dad! episode "All About Steve" (2005), Snot holds up a fictional magazine which reads "500 reasons why Krull is better than sex!"
- The Krull glaive was spoofed in South Park, season 11, episode 5 ("Fantastic Easter Special", 2007). Jesus uses the glaive to kill self-appointed Pope Bill Donohue.
- In the 2007 film The Air I Breathe, Brendan Fraser's character (Pleasure) refers to Rell, the Cyclops, as both characters have the ability to see into the future, though significantly different for each.
- In the 2008 Family Guy episode "Baby Not on Board", Carl tells Chris that he should not watch Krull after Chris expresses his view that the eagles are a major plot hole in The Lord of the Rings trilogy. In the episode "Meet the Quagmires", when Peter travels back to 1984, he tells Lois he would rather see Krull than Zapped!.
- In the 2008 game Dark Sector, the protagonist extensively uses a three-bladed weapon named the Glaive, with its design being reminiscent of Krull's glaive. The weapon also makes an appearance in Warframe, the game's spiritual successor. Warframe also includes characters named Rell and Ergo.
- In 2008, the third entry in the Bloons Tower Defense series gave the Boomerang Monkeys the ability to throw Glaives.
- In the 2008 Robot Chicken episode "In a DVD Factory", a sketch shows Prince Colwyn promising to save everyone with his glaive; he then throws it in a cave, only for it to immediately boomerang back to him and jam inside his back, prompting him to ask rhetorically "The glaive is stuck in my back, isn't it?"
- The Cyclops and fire mares from Krull are emulated in the 2009 film Gentlemen Broncos. Also, one of the characters unknowingly has his dialogue completely dubbed over in a movie he performs in, similarly to how Lysette Anthony and Robbie Coltrane had their voices overdubbed in the production of Krull.
- The 2009 film Bikini Bloodbath Christmas features two actors dressed up as Prince Colwyn and Rell, selling Glaives door to door.
- In the 2013 game Far Cry 3: Blood Dragon the player receives a weapon near the end of the game named the Killstar, with its design being very similar to the Krull Glaive.
- Sean Phillips, the reclusive central character of John Darnielle's novel Wolf in White Van (2014), buys an ex-rental VHS copy of the film and spends four pages musing on the film's story and themes.
- The glaive was used by Sho near the end of the 2018 film Ready Player One to cut off I-R0k's arm.
- It was spoofed by RiffTrax on 28 December 2018.

== Notes ==
^a More commonly, the term glaive is used to describe a halberd-like weapon.
