= Rubbish (radio series) =

British radio series

- Genre: Radio comedy
- Country of origin: United Kingdom
- Language(s): English
- Home station: BBC Radio 4
- Starring: Reece Dinsdale; Nicola Walker
- Written by: Tony Bagley
- Original release: October 2006

Rubbish is a British radio series written by Tony Bagley, who also wrote Married. It was first broadcast on BBC Radio 4 in October 2006. A second series began broadcasting on 31 October 2007.

== Plot summary ==
Martin Christmas (Reece Dinsdale) is a "local government officer" in the Sanitation department, whose days revolve around endless recycling initiatives and whose nights revolve around failed relationships and cynical interior monologues.

Much of the program is Martin narrating his life, in between conversations with the various deranged people around him. His boss agonizes over competition with other departments to come top of "greenness" league tables. His smug colleagues constantly swap girlfriends, or as they say, recycle them. Random bursts of insanity break into his world, as with the stranger from another department who accuses Martin of conducting a neo-pagan rite for a woman who had renounced paganism, followed by the pagans in the council attempting to recruit him.

Unwillingly attending a diversity course Martin somehow achieves an inner peace and, to his surprise, beds the instructor, Sarah (Nicola Walker). Much of the rest of the series revolves around their on-and-off relationship, her somewhat masochistic yearnings, and the highs and lows of his moods. She augments her own meagre income by teaching courses in "life editing" and similar fads at adult education colleges, dragging Martin along to make up the numbers, but not to participate.

Ever present is the "Fifth Horseman of the Apocalypse, Embarrassment" who pays regular visits, especially when Martin lets himself be led into temptation, such as by scaling the tower at the local fire station, in the nude, with a couple of adventurous neighbours.

Like the hero of Married, Martin is a world-class curmudgeon who deconstructs the world around him in long literate sentences.
