= Dimly Lit =

Studio album by Neils Children
- Released: 10 June 2013
- Recorded: December 2012 at Studio La Vache, Toulouse, France
- Genres: Psychedelia, hauntology, neo-psychedelia, indie electronic
- Length: 43.21
- Label: Boudoir Moderne
- Producers: Neils Children, John Michel Cros, Ayumu Matsuo

Neils Children chronology
X.Enc (2009)	Dimly Lit (2013)

Dimly Lit is an album by British band Neils Children. The album was recorded throughout December 2012 at Studio La Vache in Toulouse, Southern France and was released on vinyl/digital download on Monday 10 June 2013 on the French independent record label Boudoir Moderne. The record represents the band's first release since 2009 and the first ever Neils Children album to be released on vinyl.

== Background ==
After a three-year hiatus, founder Neils Children members John Linger and Brandon Jacobs played shows with original bassist James Hair, focusing on material from their 2003–2005 period. The shows put the band in touch with French promoter and label owner Damien Louchet, who proposed the group recording an album for his label Boudoir Moderne. Once the decision was made to record a new album Linger completed demos for various songs that feature on the album, and once the material was chosen the sessions for the album were booked. Without Hair on board (who decided against further band work in favour of building up his homemade food business) Linger and Jacobs decamped to Toulouse, France to record an album's worth of new material as a two-piece, sharing the instrumental duties of drums, bass, guitar, percussion and keyboards between them.

== Musical style ==
The material differs from the band's previous work and focuses on much more melodic instrumental parts, performed on vintage synthesizers and keyboard sounds such as Roland Juno, harpsichord, mellotron and hammond organ whilst sidelining the importance and prominence of guitar. The song 'The Beat of the Boulevard' also features the unique sounds of the autoharp based iPhone app AutoArp.

The album incorporates elements of psychedelia, library music recordings, jazz and krautrock. Bands such as Stereolab, Broadcast and Silver Apples have been noted as being an influence on the album, which can be heard in the drum patterns, keyboard lines and vocal melodies, as well as in the production of the songs which feature strong use of spring reverb, valve amplifiers and tape delay. The short, hauntology-esque vignettes between various songs also bear resemblance to releases from the Ghost Box record label, such as those by The Focus Group and Belbury Poly. Studio La Vache, the studio at which the album was recorded in rural Toulouse, uses a mixing desk once belonging to the famous cabaret venue Moulin Rogue.

== Track listing ==
Side 1:

1. "At A Gentle Pace"
2. "Edward the Confessor [Featuring Amy Turnnidge on vocals]"
3. "Dimly Lit"
4. "The Beat of the Boulevard [Featuring Bonnie Carr on vocals]"
5. "The Way The Web Was Woven"
6. "Warm Wave"

Side 2:

1. "Never Could Be Any Other Way"
2. "Telling"
3. "Trust You"
4. "Those You Thought Would, But Who Never Will Again"
5. "What's Held in My Hands"

All songs written by John Linger. John Linger- Vocals, Bass, Guitar, Keyboards. Brandon Jacobs- Drums, Keyboards, Percussion. Recorded and Produced by Neils Children, John-Michel Cros and Ayumu Matsuo. Mixed by James Aparicio. Cover photo by Damien Louchet. Artwork by Ciaran O'Shea.

== After recording ==
After the recordings were completed, the pair recruited former Strange Idols guitarist David Smith and French musician Syd Kemp (on keyboards and bass respectively) to form the nucleus of the current live band which have played exclusive one-off shows in support of the album. The first of these was an intimate sold-out show at London's Power Lunches venue where the full album was played in sequence. Since the primary Dimly Lit shows the band have pared down the number of songs in the live set, but the set still consists only of material from the album. They played Bad Vibrations' all-dayer at The Shacklewell Arms with Novella, YoungHusband and The Tambourines. On Monday 10 June 2013, the release date of Dimly Lit, they returned to the same East London venue with support from YoungHusband and Lost Harbours. It was announced that in July 2013 the group would play as part of the East End Live festival line-up featuring Toy, The Monochrome Set and Pere Ubu among others.

The video for the lead single "Trust You" was featured on The Pirate Bay's "The Promo Bay" home page and received over 60,000 views.

Professional ratings
Review scores
Source	Rating
Drowned in Sound	9/10 stars
Loud and Quiet	8/10 stars
Louder Than War	8/10 stars
Q Magazine	4/5 stars
Artrocker	4/5 stars

== Critical reception ==
The album has received widespread critical acclaim from various important music publications such as Q Magazine, Loud and Quiet, Louder Than War, Artrocker and Shindig! Magazine.

Q Magazine gave the album 4/5 in their August 2013 issue claiming the album as being "unexpectedly brilliant". Drowned in Sound gave the album 9 out of 10 and declared it 'One of this years finest albums'.

Both Loud and Quiet and Louder Than War gave the record 8/10, with Louder than War stating that the album is "a definite contender for album of the year" whilst also featuring Dimly Lit as part of their midyear 'Albums of 2013' list in July, and Loud and Quiet proclaiming that Dimly Lit is '... a genuinely wonderful record'.

Digital magazine Artrocker awarded the album 4/5, stating that the album exhibits "... a maturity and coming of age ... a contemporary record which would fit snugly alongside Tame Impala".

Shindig! Magazine gave the album a favourable review in their April 2013 edition, with writer Neil Hussey noting the eclectic blend of sounds featured; "Neils Children are musical magpies ... mixing and matching with verve and intelligence. Well worth checking out."

== 2013 end of year polls ==
The Active Listener: 6# out of #10
Music blog The Active Listener voted Dimly Lit #6 place out of #50 in 'The Active Listener's Favorite 50 Albums of 2013' poll in November 2013, and claimed the album to be "... a record full of solid songs with hooks everywhere – a worthy successor to Broadcast's earlier work perhaps?".

Levitation: #3 out of #10
Music website Levitation put Dimly Lit at #3 out of #10 in their 'Top ten albums for 2013'.

Dom Gourlay (Drowned in Sound): No. 3 out of #50
Drowned in Sound writer Dom Gourlay was an early supporter of the album and put it at No. 3 out of No. 50 in his personal Top 50 Albums of 2013.

White Tapes: #16 out of #100
German-based music site White Tapes placed Dimly Lit at #16 out of #100 in their best records of 2013, voted by users.

Akoome Web Radio (Greece): Top 14 albums
Greek based web radio station Akoome put Dimly Lit in their top 14 records of 2013.

== Collaborators ==
The album Dimly Lit was recorded within two weeks with engineers John-Michel Cros and Ayumu Matsuo, and was mixed back in London by Factory Floor and These New Puritans collaborator James Aparicio. The artwork was created by long-term friend and The Horrors graphic designer Ciaran O'Shea a.k.a. Discordo. The album also features Amy Turnnidge of Theoretical Girl and Bonnie Carr of Electricity in Our Homes on vocals on "Edward the Confessor" and "The Beat of the Boulevard" respectively.

The first music video for the album made for the song 'Trust You' was filmed and edited by Pierre Bouvier-Patron of Friends Studio, London.

The second music video made for the song "Dimly Lit" was filmed, directed and edited by experimental film maker EmmaaLouise Smith.

== Links ==
- Official Neils Children
- Official Neils Children Facebook page
- Official Neils Children Twitter page
- Boudoir Moderne Records Bandcamp page
