= Change/Return/Success =

Studio album by Neils Children
- Released: 20 August 2004
- Studios: Bark Studio, London
- Genres: Post-punk, psychedelia, punk rock
- Label: Soft City
- Producers: Neils Children, Brian O'Shaughnessey

Neils Children chronology
Change/Return/Success (2004)	Something Perpetual (2007)

Change/Return/Success is the first long playing album by British band Neils Children, released in August 2004 on Soft City Recordings.

== Background ==
After releasing the critically acclaimed ltd. edition vinyl only singles 'Come Down' and 'I Hate Models' the group entered the studio to record extra tracks for a CD mini-album release, which also featured both singles' A and B sides for those unable to purchase the vinyl releases. Although not intended to be regarded as the band's first album proper, the collection was highly acclaimed by both critics and fans alike and can be marked as an important early step in the group's career.

== Musical style ==
The music featured on the album draws heavily from the British post-punk genre, with influences such as Gang of Four and Public Image Limited highly audible. Alongside these more aggressive and angular sound are psychedelic and space rock influences, such as the group's love of Syd Barrett's early Pink Floyd. The name of the album was taken from Barrett's use of the I Ching tome in his song Chapter 24.

Some songs show a nod to the then contemporary dance-punk revival, with "Trying to Be Someone Else for Free" featuring the 'four to the floor' drum beat adopted by bands like Liars and The Rapture. Others present an almost grunge rock bent, and tracks "Come Down" and "How Does It Feel Now You're on Your Own" reminiscent of In Utero era Nirvana.

== Critical reception ==
The album's release saw strong support from publications such as the NME. They awarded the album 8/10 and claimed it to be 'absolutely vital'. The following year they also included Neils Children singer John Linger in their yearly 'Cool List' feature, coming in at 30 out of 50 places. The group were largely favoured by the magazine and around the time of release were regularly included in interview and review features.

Online music site Gigwise awarded the album 4 and a half stars out of 5, the only gripe being the record's short running time.

== Track listing ==
1. Come Down
2. How Does It Feel Now You're on Your Own?
3. I Hate Models
4. Trying to Be Someone Else for Free
5. Getting Evil in the Playground
6. What Will You Say to Me?
7. In the Past
8. See Through Me

(Hidden Track: Nwod Emoc)

== Personnel ==
- John Linger – Guitar, vocals
- James Hair – Bass
- Brandon Jacobs – Drums

All songs written by John Linger.

Recorded at Bark Studio by Brian O'Shaughnessey. Produced by Brian O'Shaughnessey and Neils Children. Cover photography by Dean Chalkley and Paul Linger.
