= Nick Maley =

Special effects make-up artist

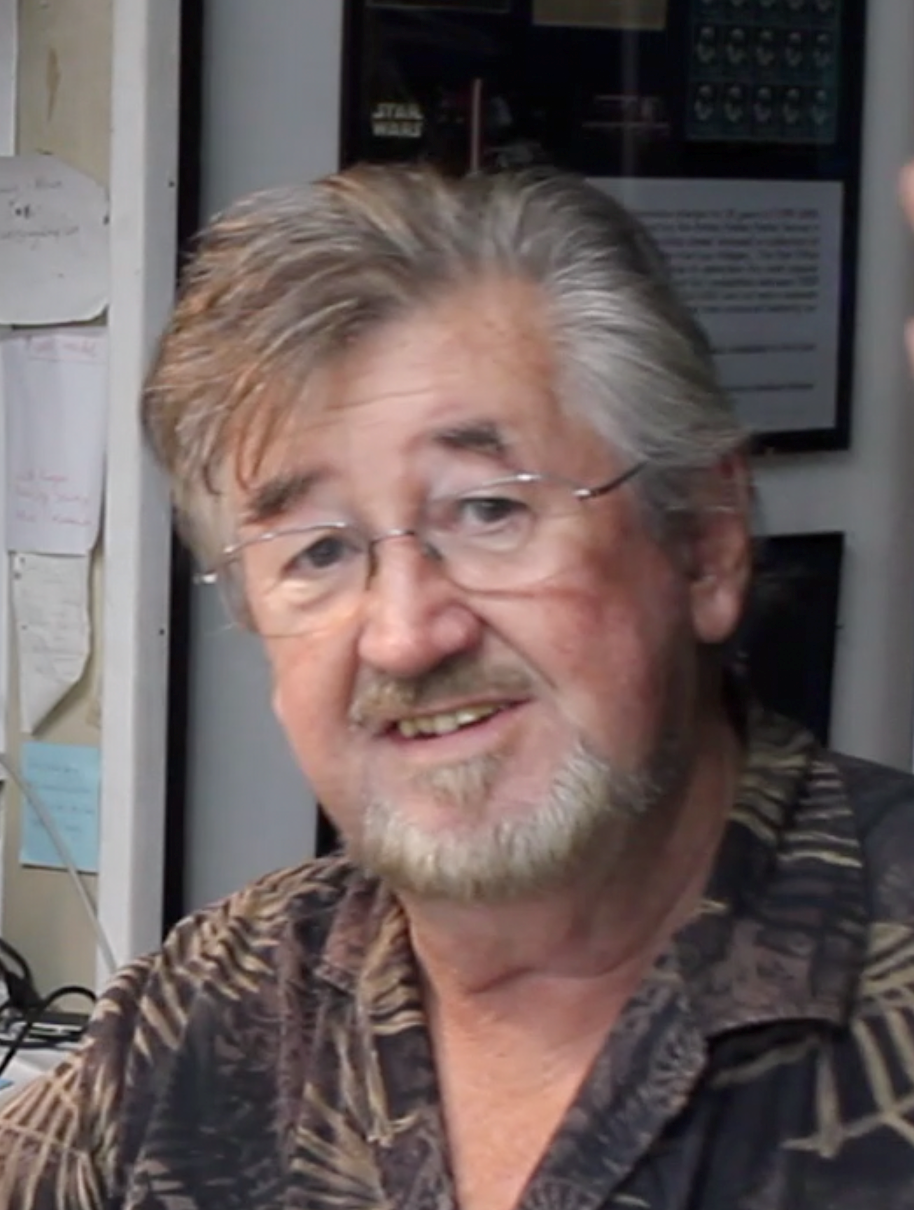
- Maley in 2018
- Occupation: special effects make-up artist
- Known for: Star Wars film series
- Website: nickmaley.com

Nick Maley is a special effects make-up artist known for his work on Yoda in the Star Wars film series. He has worked on a total of 53 films including Superman, Highlander, and Krull. He is sometimes referred to as "That Yoda Guy” for his work on the creation of Yoda for Star Wars: Episode V - The Empire Strikes Back. He was nominated for an Emmy Award for his work on the 1982 film The Hunchback of Notre Dame. He now operates the “That Yoda Guy Movie Exhibit” (formerly called “Planet Paradise”) on the Dutch side of Sint Maarten in the Caribbean. His museum houses many pieces of movie memorabilia spanning almost nine decades of film. He uses his museum as a front for his non-profit foundation, encouraging kids to follow their dreams.

== Biography ==
Maley became interested in film at an early age. His father was an actor and he watched makeup artists back stage while growing up. In his earlier years, he worked on school plays where he did the makeup for the actors.

Some of Maley's earliest work includes the 1970 version of Julius Caesar with Charlton Heston. He later met Stuart Freeborn who hired Maley for the original Star Wars film, helping make Yoda's head, hands, and feet. Maley also worked with Freeborn and others on various creatures that made up the Cantina scene for the film. He also worked on The Empire Strikes Back, which he described as his favorite movie to work on. He is also a writer, creating the screenplay for the 1981 film Inseminoid. He created the script in four days along with his wife Gloria, also supplying the makeup for the characters in the film.

Maley is originally from London but moved to Sint Maarten in 2007 with his wife Gloria, and opening the Planet Paradise movie exhibit. The exhibit features versions of various Star Wars characters and other memorabilia from his work in the film industry. He is also an artist and painter whose works have been featured across 18 different countries in museums and galleries.

Maley was honored by Lucasfilm in 2016. The same year he also rebuilt a replica Yoda using the same principles as the original.

== Select filmography ==
Year	Title	Role
1977	Star Wars: A New Hope	Makeup artist
1978	Superman	Makeup artist
1980	The Empire Strikes Back	Makeup artist (Yoda)
1980	Superman II	Makeup artist
1981	Inseminoid	Screenwriter, makeup artist
1983	The Keep	Makeup artist
1985	Lifeforce	Makeup artist
1986	Highlander	Makeup artist
