= Clare McIntyre =

British playwright and actress

- Born: 21 July 1952; Harrogate, Yorkshire, England
- Died: 27 November 2009 (aged 57)
- Writing career
- Period: 1980s
- Genre: Drama
- Notable works: I've Been Running (1986), Low Level Panic (1988), My Heart's a Suitcase (1990), No Warning For Life (1992), The Thickness of Skin (1996), Bob's Play (1999), The Changeling (2001), The Maths Tutor (2003)
- Notable awards: Beckett Award (1989), Evening Standard and London Drama Critic's Most Promising Playwright Award (1990)

Lindsay Clare McIntyre (21 July 1952 – 27 November 2009) was a British playwright and actress. She was among the feminist playwrights who contributed to the deconstruction of traditional forms of female representation. She debuted on the British feminist theatre scene as an actress in the 1970s, and emerged as a writer with allegiance to feminist issues a decade later.

== Biography and career ==
McIntyre was born in Harrogate, then in the West Riding of Yorkshire, on 21 July 1952 and grew up in Woldingham, Surrey, to later move to Manchester to study drama at the University of Manchester.

She started working in acting with the Nottingham Playhouse's theatre-in-education team, and later joined the feminist Women's Theatre Group as a performer and deviser. Before devoting herself to full-time feminist playwriting, she also played minor roles in films such as The Pirates of Penzance (1983), Hotel du Lac (1986) and A Fish Called Wanda (1988).

In the following years, she wrote not only for the stage, but also for television, as she contributed to the British soap operas EastEnders and Castles, and radio, with Walls of Silence (1993) and Noisy Bodies (1999). She taught on a postgraduate playwriting course at the University of Birmingham from 1991 to 1998.

== Death ==
McIntyre died of multiple sclerosis on 27 November 2009, twenty-four years after she was first diagnosed with the disease. She was 57 years old.

== Major works ==
Characterised by a humorous and imaginative style, poignant dialogue and complex characters, McIntyre's plays shrewdly expose feminist concerns such as women's anxieties over personal relationships, their bodies and pornography.

Among the awards she received for her theatre pieces are the Beckett Award in 1989 and the Evening Standard and London Drama Critic's Most Promising Playwright Award in 1990. She won the former for Low Level Panic (1988) and the latter for My Heart's a Suitcase (1990). Both stage plays were performed at the Royal Court Theatre and televised in 1994 and 1993 respectively. They depict women dealing with the concerns engendered by an inhospitable world. McIntyre's other theatre pieces include: I've Been Running (1986), No Warning For Life (1992), The Thickness of Skin (1996), Bob's Play (1999), The Changeling (2001) and The Maths Tutor (2003).

== Film appearances ==
- The Pirates of Penzance (1983)
- Krull (1983)
- Plenty (1985)
- Hotel du Lac (1986)
- Empire State (1987)
- A Fish Called Wanda (1988)

== Published works ==
=== Film and television ===
- Hi How Are You (1989)
- Junk Mail (1991 screenplay)
- Castles (1994, episode 23)
- Hungry Hearts (1996 pilot and 1998 re-development)
- EastEnders (1998, several episodes)

=== Radio ===
- I've Been Running (1990 adaptation of own stage play)
- Walls of Silence (1993 original radio play)
- The Art of Sitting (1995)
- Shelf Life (1996, original series pilot)
- Noisy Bodies (1999)
- My Heart's a Suitcase (2011)

=== Television and theatre adaptation ===
- My Heart's a Suitcase (1993 TV adaptation of own stage play)
- Low Level Panic (1994 TV adaptation of own stage play)
- Beware Of Pity (1998 theatre adaptation of Stefan Zweig's eponymous novel)

=== Theatre ===
- I've Been Running (1986)
- Low Level Panic (1988)
- My Heart's a Suitcase (1990)
- No Warning For Life (1992)
- The Thickness of Skin (1996)
- Bob's Play (1999)
- The Changeling (2001)
- The Maths Tutor (2003)
