= Kill Casino =

- Origin: The United Kingdom
- Genres: Punk; Alternative rock Rock
- Labels: Nothing Stays Golden, Cargo Records
- Members: Karen Luan; Chris Ryan; Paul-Luc Gifford
- Website: Official website

Kill Casino is an English rock band, featuring Karen Luan on lead vocals and bass, Chris Ryan on guitar and Paul-Luc Gifford on drums.

== History ==
=== Formation ===
Luan met Ryan and they formed the band, and in 2006, made their first festival appearance at Truck festival, Oxford, narrowly avoiding electrocution by lightning. Back in London, they were sharing stages with bigger names on the circuit, headlining Visible Noise's Subverse club in London and guesting at the 'Rock' club at the Mean Fiddler. In July 2006 they started recording their debut album, a feat that took them three different recording studios (and a lounge) over eight months under the guidance of Rob Haggett. I've Been to London to See the Queen received rave reviews in September 2007, and tracks from the album got played on Kerrang, BBC Radio One, and XFM and the accompanying "Stolen Eyes" video debuted online in YouTube's top 100 played artists. In August 2007 Paul-luc Gifford joined the band.

=== I've Been To London to See the Queen (2007) ===
In 2007 Kill Casino released their debut album I've Been To London To See The Queen. It was released on the record label Nothing Stays Golden. Shortly before the album's release the duo were joined by Paul-Luc Gifford.

Kerrang! gave the album 4 out of 5 K's and said "Standing apart for any notion of a 'scene' their debut is an enjoyable guessing game.", rocksomething.com remarked; "This band is one of those rare treasures you occasionally come across on the UK music scene with something unique to offer." and rockmidgets.com called the band "Kick-you-in-the-nuts rock."

They also were featured as an up-and-coming act in a full page article in Kerrang!.

While on tour with TheStart their show in London at Barfly was reviewed my Kerrang!. Kill Casino was called an "anthemic roit".

=== "Paper Walls & The Voice Downstairs" (2008–2009) ===
In April 2008 Kill Casino were invited by Against Me! lead singer Laura Jane Grace to open for the Florida punk rockers on their UK tour. That summer, Kill Casino played a number of UK festivals including Offset Festival. The band released a re-recorded version of album track "Underwater" as a single that October and saw the accompanying video playlisted on Kerrang! TV. In December 2008, Kill Casino began recording the follow-up to I've Been To London To See The Queen with producer John Mitchell.

In June 2009 Kill Casino were invited by NOFX mainman Fat Mike to open for his side-project Me First and the Gimme Gimmes on their UK tour.

Kill Casino's EP, "Paper Walls & The Voice Downstairs" was released digitally in the UK on 10 August and physically on 17 August. Rock Sound described the EP as "first-rate" and "landing on the right side of originality rather than emulation" giving it 7/10 in their August 2009 issue while Kerrang! said "Paper Walls..." was "full of slick punk-rock darts along with the enjoyably edgy flipside to this trio's output" and awarded it 4 out of 5 Ks.

== Discography ==
=== Albums ===
I've Been To London To See The Queen

- Released: 10 September 2007
- Formats: CD / Digital Download
- Label: Nothing Stays Golden / Cargo Records

=== EPs ===
"Paper Walls & The Voice Downstairs"

- Released: 10 August 2009 (digitally) / 17 August 2009 (physically)
- Formats: CD / Digital Download
- Label: Nothing Stays Golden / Cargo Records

=== Singles ===
"Stolen Eyes"

- Released: 8 October 2007
- Formats: CD / Digital Download
- Label: Nothing Stays Golden / Cargo Records

"Best Served Cold"

- Released: 14 April 2008
- Formats: CD / Digital Download
- Label: Nothing Stays Golden / Cargo Records

"Underwater"

- Released: 20 October 2008
- Formats: CD / Digital Download
- Label: Nothing Stays Golden / Cargo Records

"You Came I Saw"

- Released: 14 July 2008
- Formats: Free Digital Download in association with www.kerrang.com
- Label: Nothing Stays Golden / Cargo Records

=== Music videos ===
- "Stolen Eyes" (2007) from I've Been to London to See the Queen
- "Best Served Cold" (2008) from I've Been to London to See the Queen
- "Underwater (2008 Version)" (2008) from I've Been to London to See the Queen
