= Neils Children =

English rock band

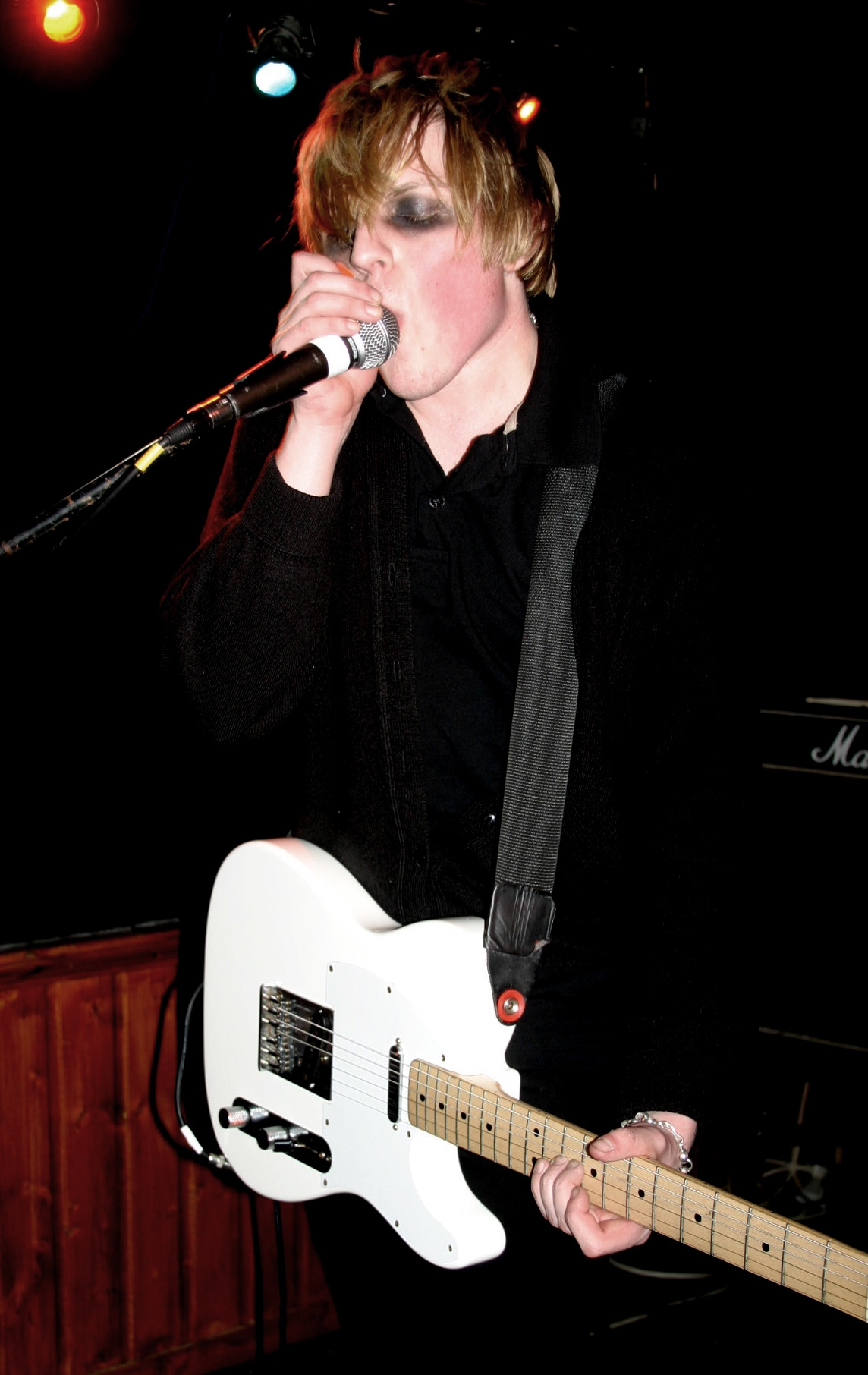
- Live 2006

Background information
- Origin: Cheshunt, Hertfordshire, England
- Genres: Neo-psychedelia, post-punk, experimental rock, indie pop, art punk
- Years active: 1999–present
- Labels: Structurally Sound; Poptones; Soft City Recordings; Vinyl Junkie; Half Machine; White Heat; Boudoir Moderne
- Members: John Linger (1999-present); Brandon Jacobs (1999-present); Syd Kemp (2013-present); Victoria Hamblett (2015)
- Past members: Tom Hawkins(1999-2000); James Hair (2000-2005, 2012); Keith Seymour (2005-2009); Paul Linger (2009); Charles Boyer (2009); David Smith (2013-2014)

Neils Children are an English rock band, formed in 1999 in Harlow, Essex, England, by lead singer and guitarist John Linger, drummer Brandon Jacobs and bassist Tom Hawkins.

The band were originally based in their hometown of Cheshunt, Hertfordshire, and were based around the nucleus of Linger and Jacobs who continued the band with a number of different bass players.

== Career ==
Neils Children formed in 1999 at Harlow College where John Linger and Brandon Jacobs were studying music with Tom Hawkins. The band's name came from Linger's obsession with 1960s proto-punk band John's Children; 'Neil' was the nickname of Hawkins, the group's original bassist, due to him apparently resembling Men Behaving Badly star Neil Morrissey.

Primarily playing freakbeat-inspired music, the band performed several gigs on the London mod scene, as well as performing in the Harlow Square Rock Contest. In 2000 Hawkins quit the band and went on to become a sound engineer for The Subways. Replacement bassist James Hair was recruited in early 2001.

They are seen as forerunners of the mid-2000s 'Southend Scene' which revolved around Junk (nightclub), a club night set up by future Horrors member Rhys Webb, Oliver Abbott, Ciaran O'Shea and John Linger and was considered the most unusual and cutting edge alternative club in the town. Adopted as honorary 'Southenders', Neils Children acted as house band for Junk Club, playing handfuls of shows either as one-off concerts or dates on longer UK tours. The 'Southend Scene' was written about in the pages of NME magazine, the focus of which went on to spawn such groups as The Horrors and These New Puritans, and it has long been noted that Neils Children acted as a catalyst for the scene and the bands involved.

They played many concerts in London, Southend, Brighton and other cities, notably playing the Insomniacs Ball in London in 2006, and the London Calling Festival in Amsterdam. John was placed Number 30 of 50 in NME's Cool List in 2005. In June 2005, their single "Always the Same" peaked at No. 56 in the UK Singles Chart. The group were much in demand as a support act for up and coming UK bands, being invited to support rising British bands such as Razorlight, Bloc Party, The Horrors, Klaxons and Art Brut on tour as well as completing various British headline tours and shows throughout the UK and Europe. In December 2005, Hair left to form Vile Imbeciles with former The Eighties Matchbox B-Line Disaster member Andy Huxley and moved to Brighton, and was replaced by Keith Seymour (formerly of Hope of the States).

Bassist Keith Seymour joined the band in 2005 and in 2007, the band received attention in the wake of the critical and commercial success of close long-term friends The Horrors, with whom they toured in April. This line-up recorded and released the most prolific amount of material in the band's catalogue, including the unreleased full-length album Pop/Aural and the band's 2009 album X.Enc. Two Japanese tours were completed alongside European and British dates.

In July 2009, Seymour left the group for personal reasons. On 10 September 2009, Neils Children played their debut live show as a short-lived four-piece band, composed of Linger and Jacobs, with Charlie Boyer (bass) and Paul Linger (percussion, samples) of Electricity In Our Homes. The set consisted of five tracks taken from the X.Enc album release and "Front on Backwards", a song written by Linger on the band's summer 2008 Japanese tour.

In August 2010, founder members Linger and Jacobs announced the split of the group, planning the band's last show at 2010's Offset Festival. Originally planned as Linger's solo performance, the duo played a couple of unique arrangements of Neils Children songs, using the second half of the show to showcase their new group, The Drop Five.

In late 2012 Neils Children founder members John and Brandon announced that the band would return from hiatus to record a new full-length album Dimly Lit, their first in over four years. Since the album's release, the band have also released a non-album single entitled "The Highs and Lows", as well as the library/soundtrack-music-themed cassette-only release Serial Music #1. The group are currently working on material to follow up 2013's Dimly Lit.

== Other work ==
Various members of the band have undertaken side projects. Linger, under the pseudonym of "Round", was the first member of Neils Children to pursue solo work and recorded in 2007 a few tracks which were posted on MySpace. He performed a solo show at the Experimental Circle Club in Southend. Jacobs performs under the name of Goodnight And I Wish*, and has recorded a number of releases.

Linger is also active as a mix engineer and record producer for various projects. He produced the early discography of the London band, Electricity In Our Homes (which features his brother Paul on drums); 2007's The Shareholders Meeting EP and the 2008 singles "We Thought It Was, But It Wasn't" (Too Pure) and "Silver Medal In Gymnastics" (4AD). Most recently he produced and mixed two tracks planned for a single release by the Chichester based post-punk band, Disconcerts. Currently he is mixing Moscow-based band Manicure's new album, scheduled for release in April/May 2011.

Record labels overseen by band members included Jacob's label Modern Pop, which has released work by Electricity In Our Homes, and Strange Idols; and the Structurally Sound label, founded by the band in 2008 to release their own music and that of associated acts.

Linger now also plays bass in the current Neils Children bassist Syd Kemp's band (also called Syd Kemp) with former Dark Horses bassist Harry Bohay on drums.

== Discography ==
=== Studio albums ===
- Change/Return/Success (2004, Soft City Recordings)
- Pop:Aural (2007, Unreleased)
- X.Enc (2009, Structurally Sound/Vinyl Junkie)
- Dimly Lit (2013, Boudoir Moderne/Structurally Sound/Echo Orange Publishing)
- Serial Music #1 (2014, Blank Editions)
- Reduction (2017, Structurally Sound)

=== Singles ===
- "St. Benet Fink" (2002, Circle Records - limited edition of 250)
- "Come Down" (2003, Soft City Recordings)
- "I Hate Models" (2004, Soft City Recordings/Loog)
- "Always The Same" (2005, Poptones/Soft City) - UK No. 56
- "Another Day" (2006, White Heat Records)
- "Stand Up" (2006, Half Machine Records)
- "Lucifer Sam" (2006, Modern Pop Records)
- "You Didn't Care" (2007, 30:30 Recordings)
- "Reflective" / "Surface" (2008, April 77 Records)
- "I'm Ill" (2008, Structurally Sound)
- "Trust You" (2013, Boudoir Moderne- Download only single)
- "Never Could Be Any Other Way" (2013, Boudoir Moderne- Download only single)
- "The Highs and Lows" (2013, Seventh Crow)

=== Live albums and compilations ===
- Something Perpetual (2006, Vinyl Junkie/Japanese Only rarites compilation)
- Perpetually/Live/2005 (2011, Structurally Sound, Live album)
- Warehouse Stories E.P (2011, Structurally Sound, 3 Track E.P)
- Live In Belgium. 2005 (2012, Structurally Sound, Live album)
- Visit-Revisted (2012, Structurally Sound, Rarities Album)

=== Promotional videos ===
- Come Down (2003, Dir. Andy Starke)
- Always The Same (2005, Dir. Rob Ackroyd)
- Another Day (2006, Dir. Rob Ackroyd)
- Stand Up (2006, Dir. Ciaran O'Shea)
- Lucifer Sam (2006, Dir. Rob Ackroyd)
- You Didn't Care (2007, Dir Rob Ackroyd)
- I'm Ill (2008, featuring SKIPtheatre)
- Motorcar (2009, Dir. EmmaaLouise Smith)
- Trust You (2013, Dir. Pierre Bouvier Patron)
- Dimly Lit (2013, Dir. EmmaaLousie Smith)
- The Highs and Lows (2013, Dir. Pierre Bouvier Patron)
