= Junk (nightclub) =

Monthly club night in Southend-on-Sea, Essex, England (2002-06)

Junk Club
- Junk
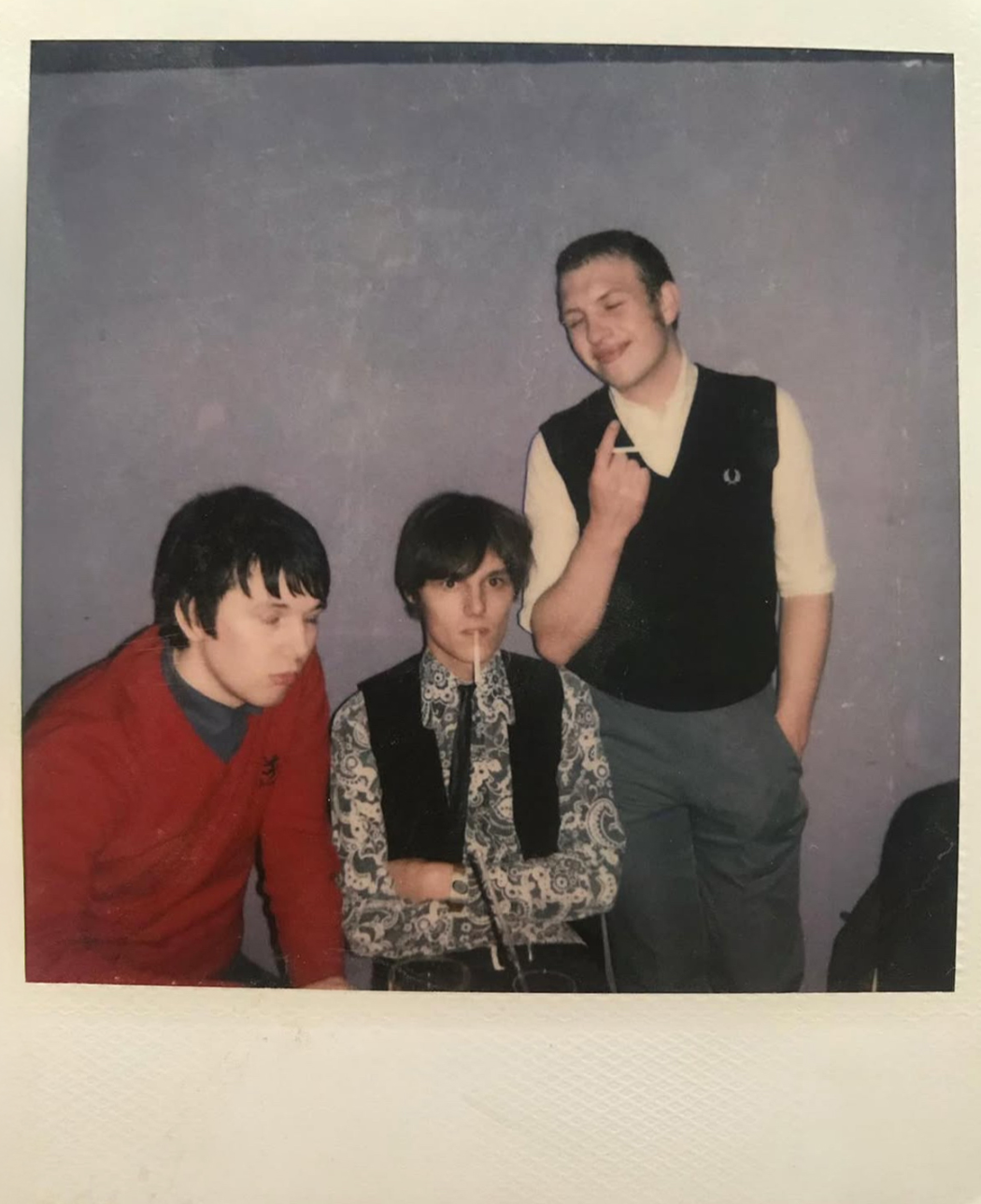
- Polaroid photo of promoters Ciaran, Rhys and Oliver taken at Junk Club, Southend (2006)
- Location: Southend-on-Sea, Essex, England
- Owner: Oliver Abbott, Rhys Webb, Ciaran O'Shea
- Type: Club night
- Events: Garage Rock, Disco Punk, Electro Pop, No-Wave Noise

Construction
- Opened: 2002
- Closed: 2006

Junk Club (commonly known as Junk) was a monthly underground club night held in the basement of the Royal Hotel in Southend-on-Sea, Essex, England, from 2002 to 2006. Founded by Oliver Abbott, Rhys "Spider" Webb (of The Horrors), and graphic artist Ciaran O'Shea, it played a key role in shaping the local post-punk and garage rock revival scene. The club served as a launching pad for several influential bands including The Horrors and These New Puritans.

== Origins ==
The first Junk night was held in September 2002. Abbott and Webb, enthusiasts of 1960s Mod culture, joined forces with O'Shea, whose background in design and jungle raves helped shape the night's aesthetic. The Royal Hotel's basement location provided an underground atmosphere that resonated with Southend's isolated, obsessive subculture.

== Music and atmosphere ==
Junk was known for its eclectic, high-energy playlists that spanned post-punk, electroclash, 1960s garage rock, jungle, and dub reggae. Tracks like "Contort Yourself" by The Contortions, "Fuck the Pain Away" by Peaches, and classics by Wire, Delta 5, and Frankie Knuckles filled the sticky, dim-lit basement space. The dress code leaned toward DIY styling — asymmetric haircuts, surplus military wear, and thrifted punk looks.

The crowd, nicknamed "Junk kids," included local teens and a growing number of East London creatives who made the trip by C2C train. The venue attracted acts such as Neils Children, The Violets, Kap Bambino, and No Bra, all performing either in the basement or the grand upstairs ballroom.

== Reception ==
In a 2023 retrospective on the UK indie explosion, photographer Dean Chalkley recalled the impact of Junk Club: “When I first went down, I felt so moved – this was the actual resistance right in front of my eyes. This little club and the kids who went there, they epitomised the punk attitude that was going on. It was exciting and raw and completely DIY. It felt like something was being born.”

== Influence and legacy ==
In August 2006, photographer Dean Chalkley presented a photo exhibition titled Southend's Underground at the Spitz Gallery in London. The exhibition focused on the Junk Club scene and its vibrant youth culture, showcasing portraits of attendees known as “Junk kids,” as well as the visual and musical identity that grew around the club. Chalkley described it as “a snapshot of the thriving music scene that's grown up around the now defunct Junk Club and bands like The Horrors and These New Puritans.”

In 2016, a selection of previously unseen Junk Club images was featured in Buenos Aires at the Centro Cultural Borges, as part of the international highlights exhibition of music photography.

Portions of the original London show were also featured in later exhibitions, including Pitti Immagine Uomo in Florence (2007), Family Viewing: Teenage Kicks in Shoreditch, and The End at Homestead in Clerkenwell.

Fashion designer Hedi Slimane, then at Dior Homme, is reported to have attended Junk and cited the scene as an influence on his Spring/Summer 2002 collection. The club also had a strong MySpace presence and cultivated its own iconography, including the "Southend Rat" logo by O'Shea, which later appeared on The Horrors’ debut single "Sheena is a Parasite."

The final Junk event took place in September 2006, with a performance by The Horrors and a live rendition of "The Last Post" by a topless trumpeter in the basement. The organizers chose to end the club night on their own terms, stating: "IT’S BETTER TO REMAIN UNDERGROUND THAN BECOME A TARGET FOR THE COMMERCIAL BOMBER."
