= Ann Gosling =

British actress

Ann Gosling is a British actress best known for her role as Georgia Prentice in the BBC sitcom Next of Kin (1995–1997). She has appeared in a variety of television and radio productions, as well as performing in the theatre.

== Personal life ==
Gosling attended Misbourne School, where she developed an early interest in the performing arts.

== Acting career ==
Gosling is most recognized for her portrayal of Georgia Prentice in the sitcom Next of Kin, which aired for three series from 1995 to 1997. The show, which also starred Penelope Keith and William Gaunt, focused on family dynamics and Gosling's character, Georgia, was a central figure.

In 1992, Gosling appeared in Tracey Ullman: A Class Act, a sketch comedy series featuring a variety of characters and skits. She also played the role of Joanna Tate in the 1994 drama series Chandler & Co.

Gosling was featured in the BBC Radio 4 sitcom Married, where she played Maxine Lightfoot, the daughter of Hugh Bonneville's character. The show aired for three seasons.

Gosling also performed in the Royal National Theatre’s production of Sunday in the Park with George, a musical by Stephen Sondheim.
