= Devotion (Kap Bambino album) =

Studio album by Kap Bambino
- Released: March 16, 2012
- Genres: Electropunk, dance-punk, electroclash
- Label: Because Music
- Producer: Orion Bouvier

Kap Bambino chronology
Blacklist (2009)	Devotion (2012)

Professional ratings
Review scores
Source	Rating
Drowned in Sound	8/10 stars
Loud And Quiet	7/10 stars
The 405	6/10 stars

Devotion is the fourth LP by French band Kap Bambino, released on March 16, 2012, by Because Music.

== Track listing ==
No.	Title	Length
1.	"Resistance Alpha"	3:17
2.	"Obsess"	2:35
3.	"Devotion"	3:34
4.	"Mer Morte"	3:02
5.	"Rise"	2:23
6.	"Burning"	2:46
7.	"King Cobra"	2:56
8.	"White Voodoo"	1:11
9.	"Next Resurrection"	5:36
10.	"Buffalo Kids"	2:49
11.	"Trapping"	2:57
12.	"Under Tender"	2:58
13.	"The Lost"	4:03
