= Rubbish =

Rubbish may refer to:

- Waste
- Garbage
- Rubbish (magazine), a fashion magazine
- Rubbish (radio series), a British radio series
- "Rubbish" (The Apprentice), a 2011 television episode
- "Rubbish", a song by Carter the Unstoppable Sex Machine
- An adjective which is colloquially used in British English to describe something unpleasant or of poor quality, e.g. "This juice tastes rubbish."
