= Offset Festival =

Coordinates: 51.61°N 0.13°E

Offset Festival was a musical festival held at Hainault Forest Country Park, just outside London, from 2008 to 2010.

== 2008 ==
The first event aimed to join the dots between cutting-edge, new artists and their influences, with 8 stages covering art rock, post-punk, indie, rock and electro. The event was headlined by influential post-punk bands Wire and Gang of Four, with performances from the likes of Black Devil Disco Club, Neils Children, Prinzhorn Dance School, My Vitriol (who re-formed to play) and Drum Eyes (DJ Scotch Egg's band).

New artists included Blood Red Shoes, XX Teens, X-Certs, ULTERIOR, Chrome Hoof, Metronomy, Johnny Foreigner, Kill Casino, The Maccabees, Young Knives and 180 others. Tickets were priced at £45 for the weekend.

Stages were curated by Last.FM, Experimental Circle Club and Artrocker magazine.

== 2009 ==
The Offset Festival returned on September 5–6, 2009, with The Slits, The Horrors, A Certain Ratio, Kap Bambino and The Futureheads. A comedy tent was also introduced run by rock and roll comedian Bob Slayer

== 2010 ==
The Offset Festival returned in 2010 on September 4–5, 2010, with first artists announced as Liquid Liquid, Cluster, Telepathe, These New Puritans and many more including Sauna Youth and Athens Polytechnic. It was previewed in NME magazine as "one of the most genuinely left-of-centre two-dayers to emerge recently, this new favourite might boast kraut pioneers Cluster and Brooklyn hype victims Telepathe but it's the spread of music across the weekend that won Offset so many friends last year."
