= Tony Bagley =

British writer

Tony Bagley is a British writer. He has written, among other scripts, the radio comedies "The Older Woman", "Married" and "Rubbish". He also wrote for the television series Specials. Degree in economics. Initially worked as a journalist, freelance copy editor and as script reader & editor.

His scripts are characterised by surreal concepts, bizarre leaps of logic, dark or ironic fantasy sequences, and literate internal monologues.

Commissioned radio plays include ‘Catching Bullets’, ‘Life On A New Planet’, ‘The Machine’, ‘Public Interest’, ‘Prophet’, ‘The Last Cigarette of the War’ and ‘Cold’. Also short stories for radio.

Comedy series, ‘The Older Woman’, with Martin Clunes & Zoe Wanamaker, went out on Radio 4 (two series).

Another comedy series, ‘Married’, with Hugh Bonneville and Josie Lawrence, again on Radio 4 (three series).

Six-part comedy series, ‘Rubbish’, also Radio 4 (two series).

Most recent series is ‘Political Animals’, with a second series following.

A black comedy, ‘The Last Word’, went out on BBC-2. Also sketch material for assorted TV shows.

Screenplays included 'Disrespect' and 'Real Time'. Stage play: 'His & Hers'.

== Awards and honours ==
Winner of a Giles Cooper Award for ‘The Machine’ (Radio 3) (postulating the effects of the invention of sound recording in Jacobean England) and a New London Radio Playwrights Award for another play, ‘Prophet’. Joint winner of the Gooding Award for best 30-minute play.

Grand Prix winner of the PAWS Drama Award. Winner of the Alomo Comedy Writing Bursary. Shortlisted for the LWT New Writer Award and the Oscar Moore Screenwriting Prize. *2013 Costa Book Awards third place in Short Story category for "The Forgiveness Thing". Shortlisted for the Bridport Short Story Prize (2017) for The Regulation Modest.
