= Married (radio series) =

- Genre: Comedy
- Running time: 30 minutes
- Country of origin: United Kingdom
- Language: English
- Home station: BBC Radio 4
- Starring: Hugh Bonneville; Josie Lawrence; Stephen Frost; Arthur Smith
- Written by: Tony Bagley
- No. of series: 3
- No. of episodes: 18
- Audio format: Stereophonic sound
- Opening theme: "I'll Never Get Out of this World Alive" by Hank Williams

Married is a BBC radio comedy with science fiction themes, first aired on BBC Radio 4 from March 1999 to October 2001.The main character is Robin Lightfoot, a confirmed bachelor with a successful architectural practice, who wakes up one day in a parallel universe in which he is married with two children. Unfortunately his counterpart in the parallel universe, who has evidently been swapped into our universe, is a cad, a womanizer, a swindler and possibly a murderer. Only the younger of the two children, Ned, believes Robin's story, largely because he reads about parallel universes in comic books.

Apart from his previously unknown wife Leslie, and the children Maxine and Ned, Robin finds the new universe populated by people he already knows, but who are different. His former business partner Dirk is still his partner in this universe, but the business is writing greeting card messages, and Dirk, who is married in our universe, is an unmarried sexual addict in the alternate one.

The ruling monarch is a King John, son of King Richard who dies during the first series. Richard was apparently the son of Edward VIII who got cold feet at the last minute when about to abdicate. King John, however, is openly gay so the prospects for an immediate heir are not good. While as Prince John he was known as an adventurer, setting records for ballooning, soon after his coronation he abandons the Royal spouse in favour of his gay lover, who was also his partner in his adventures.

The place where Robin lives, an alternate Surrey, is economically depressed while North East England is prosperous. Some forms of alcohol are illegal, while marijuana is legal.

Famous people in our universe are re-imagined for satirical effect. Tony Blair is the leader of the Conservative Party which is currently out of power, the government being in the hands of the Liberal Democrats. Stephen Fry is a Royal Biographer, and Newsnight presenter Kirsty Wark is a homeless waif who sets fire to telephone boxes. Art critic Brian Sewell is the celebrated designer and manufacturer of ultra-modern "S-plan" furniture. TV presenter John Humphrys is an outrageous performance artist who likes to perform naked.

The show was written by Tony Bagley.

== Main cast ==
- Robin Lightfoot - Hugh Bonneville
- Leslie Lightfoot - Josie Lawrence
- Dirk - Stephen Frost
- Ned Lightfoot - Sam Bradley
- Maxine Lightfoot - Ann Gosling
- Arthur Smith - himself
- Julia Lightfoot - Barbara Murray

== Production details ==
- Signature music: "I'll Never Get Out of This World Alive" sung and jointly written by Hank Williams.

== Series 1 ==
Dealing with the fallout from the activities of the other Robin, and wondering if he'd like to keep this new life, form much of the plot of the first series of six episodes, first broadcast in 1999. Another series aired the following year.

In the opener, Robin returns from visiting a client to tell Dirk that he has decided to decline the contract. The partnership's main line of business is nursery schools and day care centres for the prosperous families of Surrey. The client in question was demanding more parking for SUV's. Dirk suggests that Robin's generally curmudgeonly outlook is due to not having a happy family life like him. Robin responds that he doesn't need other people in his life and that the person he most respects is himself.

Next morning Robin wakes up in his house, to find Leslie next to him and "his" children Ned and Maxine arguing over access to the bathroom. He decides that Leslie and the kids are ingenious squatters, but abandons that when he sees that "his" kitchen looks entirely different. He then thinks that it is all an elaborate practical joke created by Dirk. This theory crumbles bit by bit, the coup de grace being delivered when the local police and emergency services are called to the house of their neighbours, the Needhams. In Robin's universe the family are irritatingly perfect. In this universe they are dysfunctional alcoholics whose children are well known to the local magistrates. In addition, the constable in charge of the situation is Robin's dentist in the other universe. Even Robin's mother Julia is changed: in his universe she is married to his father and is inclined to let fly with a shotgun at anything that moves on her land, but in the new universe she is a serial monogamist who marries and divorces younger men. Robin also has two new half-brothers, both called Ian.

As the series proceeds Robin begins to warm to his sudden family, especially "his" precocious son Ned who believes him and even has some theories about alternate universes. Just as Robin and Leslie have begun to have marital relations, which ironically convinces Leslie that he really is not her Robin, women begin showing up demanding that Robin acknowledge paternity of their children.

Robin engages a children's entertainer for Ned's birthday, who turns out to be comedian Arthur Smith. Robin tries to launch Arthur's career with the material created by the Arthur Smith in his universe. Arthur seems more interested in dating Maxine at first, but rejects her as soon as he begins to become successful.

== Series 2 ==
In the second series, Robin seems to be trapped in the alternate universe despite an occasional fall through into ours and back. His life in our universe has been wrecked by the other Robin, who has liquidated all his assets and absconded with the money. To add insult to injury, his "wife" Leslie divorces him in the alternate universe, forcing him to leave the house he owned in both universes for a damp basement flat. From time to time, however, the evil Robin slips back to add mayhem, as when he kills Leslie's lover, a "puffinologist" from Scotland called Murdo.

Comedian Arthur Smith appears as himself, both as the "original" and as an alternate version who steals his alter ego's material, becoming a fabulously rich resident of the select enclave of Worthing, West Sussex.

In one episode, Robin realizes that antique collecting is unknown in the new universe, so he can buy fine old furniture for a song and sell it to the prosperous citizens of Newcastle-upon-Tyne at a high profit. Unfortunately his alter-ego's problems with the Inland Revenue mean that he is told to either stop the business or pay all the back taxes he owes.

As the second series ends, universes collide resulting in two Tony Blairs indulging in fisticuffs on television, while the evil Robin returns, only to dissolve into green goo. Robin Lightfoot returns to his "family", Leslie gives birth to twins and daughter Maxine pops out a baby as well, the father being one of the Arthur Smiths. Bliss is forestalled when the Leslie whom Robin knew is replaced by one from our universe. Her only encounter with him resulted in a trip to the hospital. She abandons the home and leaves Robin in charge. Maxine rejects Arthur, as she preferred the other one who rejected her.

== Series 3 ==
The third series opens with England recovering from the devastating effects of the collision of universes. Whole towns have disappeared, BBC reporters are being killed and eaten in the countryside, and there is a campaign to help all the "glops", people who find themselves sharing a body with a personality from the other universe. One such has the personalities of TV presenters Mariella Frostrup and Carol Smillie.

Robin goes through personality changes as Leslie becomes an artist while Dirk, who had always coveted the other Leslie, ingratiates himself with her. A new character, Alan, was Maxine's best female friend before the universes collided, but has changed into a boy who wants a boy-girl relationship with Maxine. Temporal and spatial anomalies keep springing surprises which are used to drive plots, such as the episode where the King's gay lover suddenly materializes, having been trapped in a pink bubble since the Universes collided.

The fourth episode of the third series was not broadcast until 2007. This episode involves an adventure in a time anomaly where Robin and Leslie were imprisoned in a Surrey ruled by Americans, while Dirk was their gaoler. The episode was presumably omitted due to the events and aftermath of September 11, 2001 (the scheduled transmission date was 21 September 2001), and not reinstated until the series' third repeat run on BBC7.

The third season ends with Robin using a time portal in his bath, leading from his birthday in 2001 to the day of his birth in 1955, in "his" universe. He finds himself sharing "his" house with Muriel and Archie, a perfect 1950s couple who have all the right things and regularly drink themselves senseless to alleviate the boredom.

Robin tries to return when all the other members of his household follow him to 1955, but discovers that the time portal is no longer there as it is after midnight, and no longer his "birth" day. He is trapped with the Lightfoot children and grandchildren, the "wrong" Leslie, and Arthur Smith, who is several decades too early for "alternative" comedy. Dirk attempts to go to 1955, but instead ends up in 1978, a time which he thinks he will enjoy.
