= Junk mail =

Junk mail may refer to:

- Advertising mail, the delivery of advertising material to recipients of postal mail
- E-mail spam, the sending of unsolicited bulk messages by email
- Junk Mail (film), Norwegian, 1997
- "The Junk Mail", an episode from the TV series Seinfeld
- Junk Mail (book), 1995, by Will Self
