= Graham McGrath =

British actor

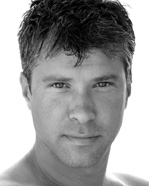
- Born: 29 July 1971 (age 54)
- Website: http://www.grahammcgrath.com

Graham McGrath (born 29 July 1971) is an English actor with film, television, radio and theatre credits. He currently also works for Merlin Entertainments based near London in Surrey, England. He had tuition at the Junior Academy of the Royal Academy of Music in London when he was only 4 years old. He also studied music and drama at the London Academy of Music and Dramatic Art (LAMDA). He spent 9 years at the academies, refining his acting and musical talents.

McGrath's first appearance in front of a camera was in a TV commercial for Colgate toothpaste as a 6-year-old. Among his first major film roles were as the loyal Titch in the 1983 fantasy adventure film Krull directed by Peter Yates and as the ten-year-old Peter the Great in a 1986 mini-series. He played the part of Tom Pym in Episode 6 of the BBC's 1987 adaptation of John Le Carre's "The Perfect Spy", written by Arthur Hopcroft. He also played Luca di Marco in the BBC soap opera EastEnders for three episodes in 1999. Since then, he has been continually active in the entertainment industry and primarily made the transition from child to adult actor in his native England.

== Bibliography ==
- Holmstrom, John. The Moving Picture Boy: An International Encyclopaedia from 1895 to 1995. Norwich, Michael Russell, 1996, p. 387.
