= Nighat Arif =

British doctor, broadcaster and author (born 1984)

Nighat Arif DL
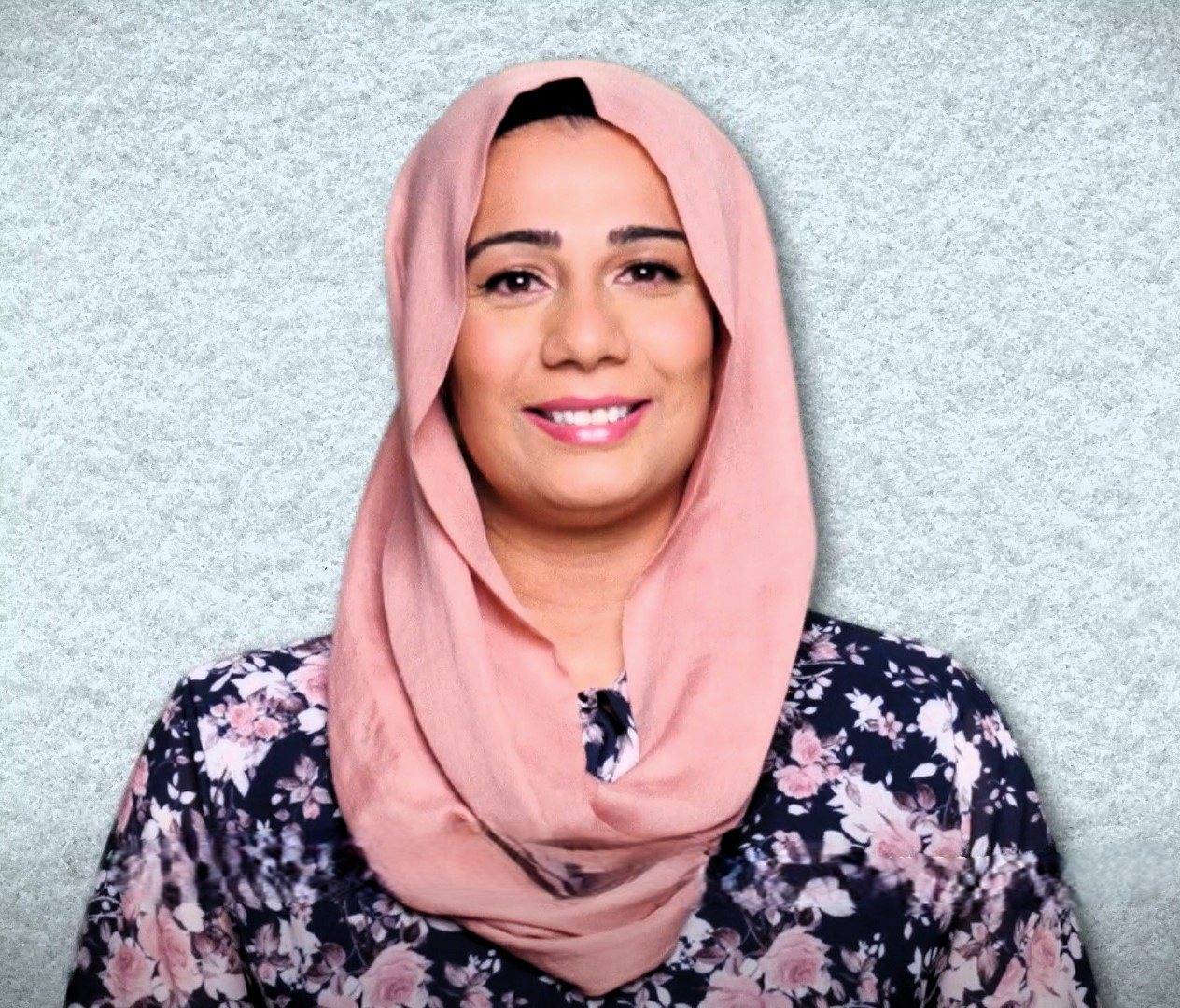
- Arif in a 2021 flu vaccine video by AstraZeneca
- Born: 9 February 1984 (age 42); Pakistan
- Occupations: Doctor; broadcaster; writer

Nighat Arif DL (born 9 February 1984) is a British broadcaster from Chesham. Born in Pakistan, she moved to the UK aged nine, and became a doctor to prevent an arranged marriage, taking a post at a practice in Chesham. She began making appearances on television in May 2019 while on maternity leave, and later became the resident doctor for BBC Breakfast and ITV's This Morning. Arif operates a TikTok account, which had nearly half a million followers in August 2023. Arif made four appearances in Countdown's Dictionary Corner in April 2024. She published a medical guide, The Knowledge, in 2023.

== Early life ==
Arif was born on 9 February 1984 in Pakistan; she moved to the UK aged nine with her mother, arriving in April 1993. She speaks Punjabi as a first language, taught herself English by watching EastEnders, and was the first in her family to speak the language. Her father, Arif Hussain, moved to the UK at the end of 1984, was the Imam for Chesham Mosque, and was made a Member of the order of the British Empire in the 2020 New Year Honours; her uncles, cousins, and grandfathers were subsidy farmers. She became a doctor to avoid an arranged marriage, knowing that education was the one pathway her parents would not object to; she decided on medicine after her careers advisor told her that veterinary science was the longest such pathway and deciding that animals were not for her. She later took a post as a doctor in Chesham.

== Media career ==
Arif first appeared on television in May 2019, when BBC Breakfast dedicated a week of programmes to the menopause. At the time, Arif was on maternity leave and was breastfeeding, and agreed to appear on the programme after its planning editor gave her an offer of having her makeup done. She then made numerous appearances as Breakfast's resident GP as well as on ITV's This Morning and hosted BBC Three Counties Radio's Sunday Breakfast Show. Arif appeared on Countdown in April 2024, making four appearances. While on the programme, she received anti-Islam abuse, prompting the production team to verify her wellbeing.

In 2020, during the COVID-19 pandemic in the United Kingdom, Arif began uploading content to her TikTok account to dispense information quickly, having been inspired to do so by her patients. When she received her COVID-19 vaccine in January 2021, she uploaded a video to that effect in Urdu. A video of her receiving the vaccine went viral online, and had been viewed by over 100,000 people by March 2021. In August 2023, the Times noted that she "often subtitles or narrates her posts about female health in Punjabi and Urdu" and that the only words for menopause in these languages translated to "barren" and "off the rag". Later that month, the i wrote that she had nearly half a million followers on the platform.

== The Knowledge ==
Arif published a book, The Knowledge, in 2023, detailing her knowledge about women's health, with the intention of tackling a number of myths she had encountered. She told the 10 April 2024 edition of Countdown that she was inspired to write it after being told by an older woman in her mosque suffering from symptoms that only "white women get menopause". The book makes use of coloured backgrounds to aid neurodivergent people, a decision inspired by her own dyslexia, and includes content on trans health and LGBT issues and life-like diagrams of both brown and black bodies. Sarah Graham of the i suggested in August 2023 that the book contained the first published images of lichen sclerosus on non-white skin, complimented it for addressing patients as equals, and opined that The Knowledge "blends her no-nonsense, stigma-busting approach with her cultural awareness, her characteristic warmth, and her clinical expertise".

== Personal life and views ==
Arif told the 9 April 2024 edition of Countdown that she had been married for 17 years and that her husband had been introduced to her three years earlier. As of September 2026, she has three boys, aged fifteen ,eleven, and eight. She has been open about her use of localised topical vaginal estrogen; she told the i in November 2023 that she would give it to all women, in order to replace that which is lost over time. She also mentioned that she would give more women vibrators for medical reasons, on the grounds that orgasms help pelvic floor muscles, lower blood pressure, and release endorphins which help relieve pain and stimulate oxytocin. She was nominated for Muslim Woman of the Year at the British Muslim Awards in 2022 and was Woman of the Year at the Asian Achievers Awards in 2024. In March 2024, Arif was named as one of 28 deputy lieutenants for Buckinghamshire.
