= Kap Bambino =

French electropunk music duo

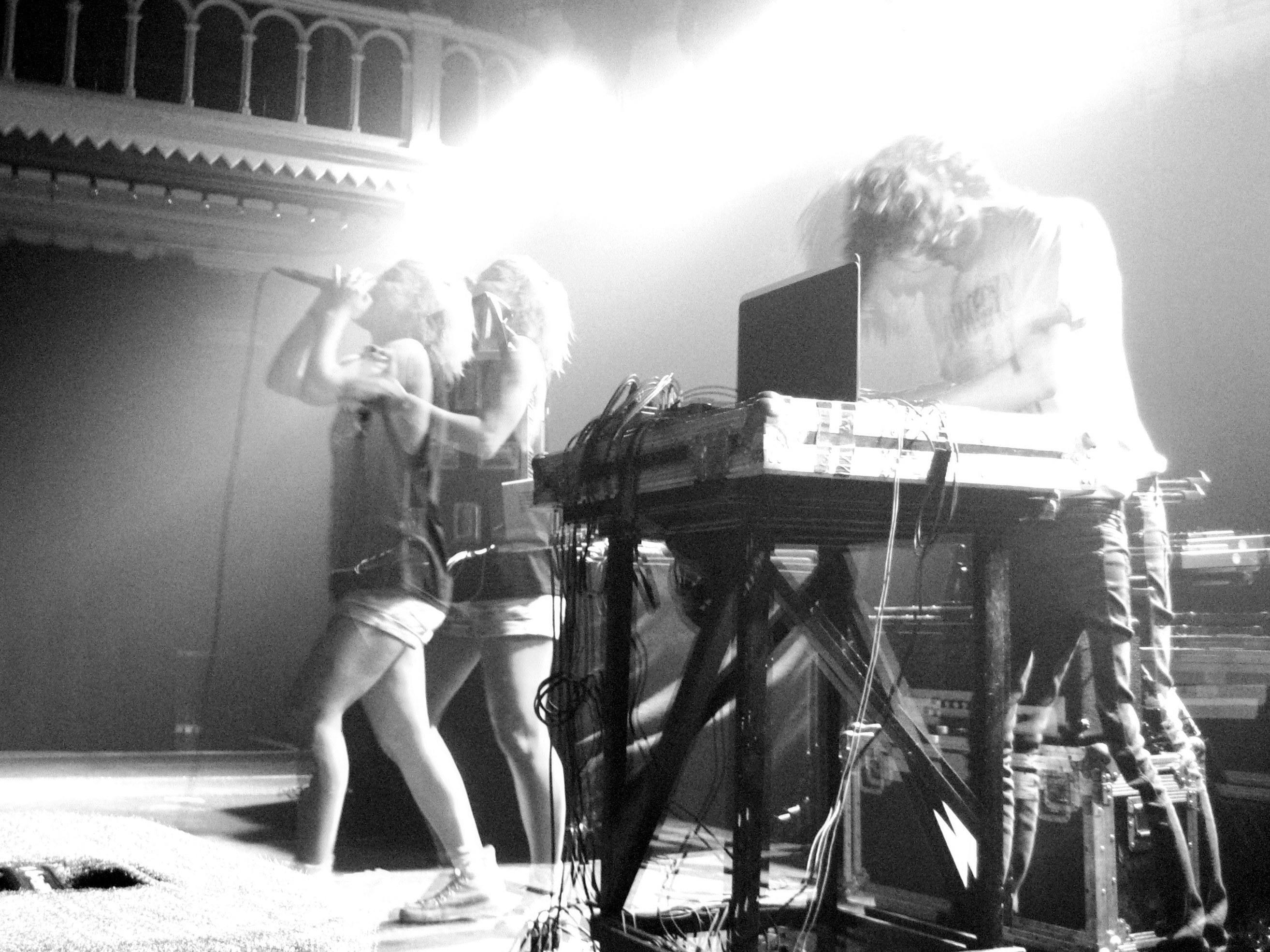

Background information
- Origin: Bordeaux, France
- Genres: Electropunk, digital hardcore, chiptune, electroclash, experimental
- Years active: 2001–present
- Labels: Wwilko, Because Music, Alt-Delete Recordings
- Members: Orion Bouvier; Caroline Martial
- Website: https://www.kapbambino.com/

Kap Bambino is a French electropunk duo created in 2001 by Orion Bouvier and Caroline Martial in Bordeaux, France.

== Style and themes ==
The group is known for Caroline Martial's wild punk vocals, Orion Bouvier's intense electronic beats, and their exciting live performances. In 2001 Martial formed the group's own independent label, "wwilko". They performed at the festivals Dot to Dot in 2007 and ZXZW in 2009. They have been featured in NME, Another Magazine, Dummy Mag and Dazed & Confused. The group was featured in Matt Irwin's 2007 film for Armani Exchange. Caroline was listed among the "hottest young models in London and New York." The group has independently toured all over Europe, Japan and Latin America. In 2009, they were a part of SXSW, and their single "Dead Lazers" made BIGSTEREO's May 2009 charts for top downloads, placed number 8.

The two have separate side projects outside of Kap Bambino, Bouvier is "Groupgris", and Martial is "Khima France".

== Members ==
- Orion Bouvier – keyboards
- Caroline Martial – vocals

== Discography ==
=== Studio albums ===
- Love (2002)
- Zero Life Night Vision (2006)
- Zero Life Night Vision 12' (2008)
- Blacklist (2009)
- Devotion (2012)
- Dust, Fierce, Forever (2019)
- No Domination (2025)

=== Singles and EPs ===
- NAZ4 (2002)
- Neutral (2005)
- New Breath / Hey! (2007)
- Save / Krak Hunter (2008)
- Red Sign / Acid Eyes (2009)
- Dead Lazers (2009)
- Batcaves (2009)
- Obsess (2011)
- Resistance Alpha / Rise (2011)
- Under Tender / Degenerate (2012)
- Erase (2019)
- Forever (2019)

== Side projects ==
- Groupgris – electronic music group with Orion Bouvier
- Khima France – electronic music Caroline Martial
