= The Horrors discography =

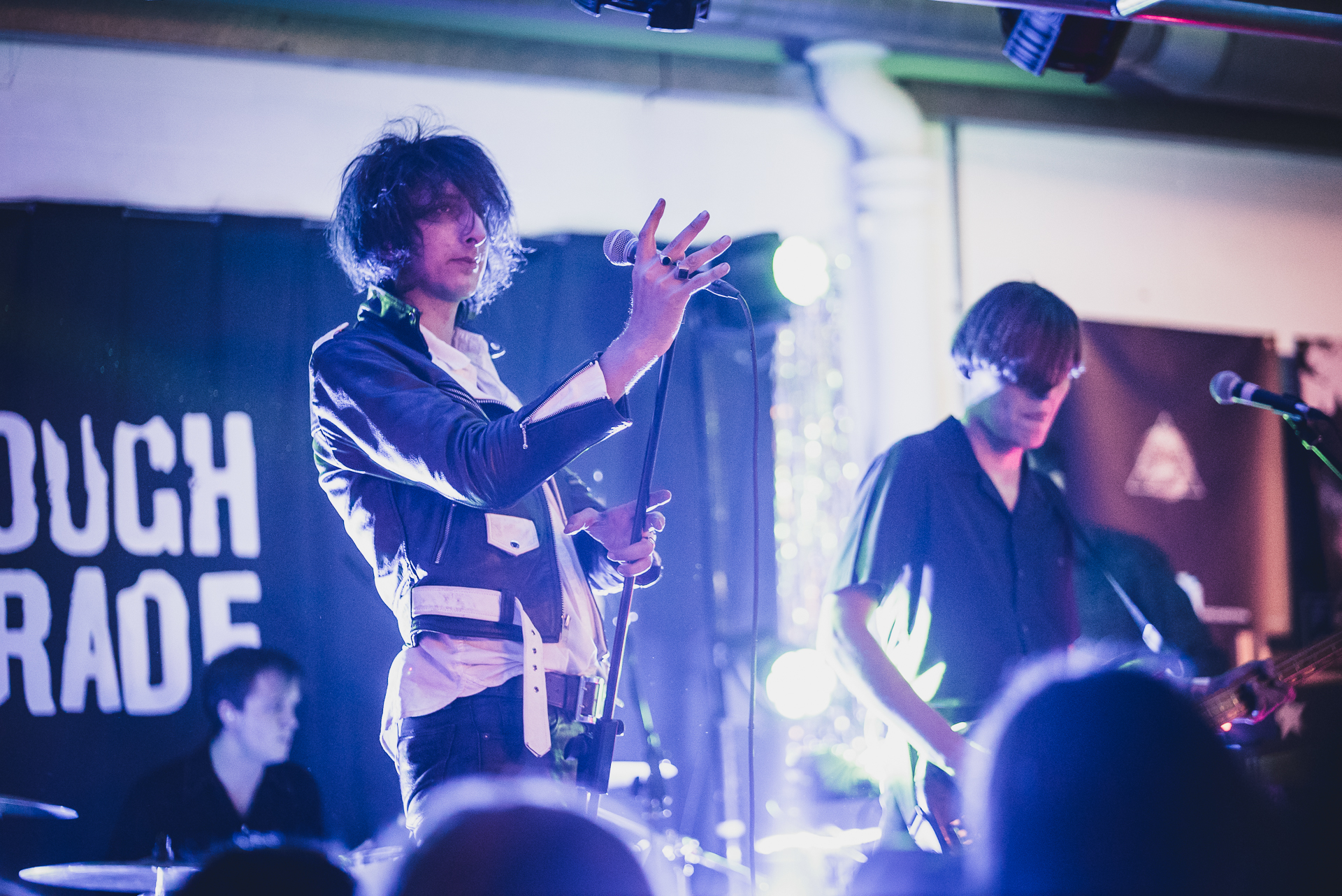
- The Horrors in 2017
- Studio albums: 6
- EPs: 4
- Singles: 21
- Music videos: 18

The discography of English rock band The Horrors consists of six studio albums, four EPs, 21 singles and 18 music videos supporting the singles.

== Studio albums ==
List of studio albums, with selected chart positions
Title	Album details	Peak chart positions										Certifications
Title	Album details	UK	BEL (FL)	BEL (WA)	FRA	IRL	MEX	NZ	SCO	SPA	US	Certifications
Strange House	Released: March 5, 2007; Label: Loog Records; Formats: LP, CD, digital download	37	—	—	—	—	—	—	32	—	— (Note: Strange House did not enter the US Billboard 200, but did peak at number 19 on the Heatseekers Albums chart.)	
Primary Colours	Released: May 5, 2009; Label: XL Recordings; Formats: 2LP, CD, digital download	25	40	—	141	87	—	—	37	—	— (Note: Primary Colours did not enter the US Billboard 200, but did peak at number 32 on the Heatseekers Albums chart.)	
Skying	Released: August 9, 2011; Label: XL Recordings; Formats: 2LP, CD, digital download	5	31	64	—	30	91	30	7	—	97	BPI: Silver
Luminous	Released: May 6, 2014; Label: XL Recordings; Formats: LP, CD, digital download	6	56	93	111	41	—	30	6	—	147	
V	Released: September 22, 2017; Label: Wolf Tone/Caroline International; Formats: 2LP, CD, digital download	8	121	138	107	86	—	—	14	63	—	
Night Life	Released: March 21, 2025; Label: Fiction Records; Formats: LP, CD, digital download	16	—	—	—	—	—	—	4	—	—	
"—" denotes releases that did not chart.

== Remix albums ==
Title	Album details
Higher	Released: 4 December 2012; Label: XL
V (Remixed)	Released: 16 August 2019; Label: Wolf Tone/Caroline International

== EPs ==
Title	EP details	Peak chart positions		
Title	EP details	UK Vinyl	UK Indie	AUS Hit.
The Horrors EP	Released: 24 October 2006; Label: Stolen Transmission	—	—	14
Shadazz / Radiation	Featuring: Suicide and Nic Void; Released: 6 October 2008; Label: Blast First Petite	—	30	—
Lout	Released: 12 March 2021; Label: Wolf Tone/Caroline International	1	—	—
Against the Blade	Released: 5 November 2021; Label: Wolf Tone/Fiction	4	—	—
Ariel	Released: 21 February 2025; Label: Fiction Records	—	—	—
"—" denotes releases that did not chart.

== Singles ==
Title	Year	Peak chart positions					Album
Title	Year	UK	UK Indie	BEL	MEX	SCO	Album
"Sheena Is a Parasite" (Note: All of the singles released by The Horrors prior to "Gloves" were chart ineligible because they were packaged with inserts and stickers, breaking chart rules.)	2006	— (Note: "Sheena Is a Parasite" did not enter the UK Singles Chart, but peaked at number 99 on the UK Physical Singles Chart.)	26	—	—	—	Strange House
"Death at the Chapel"	2006	—	—	—	—	—	Strange House
"Count in Fives"	2006	—	—	—	—	—	Strange House
"Gloves"	2007	34	—	—	—	20	Strange House
"She Is the New Thing"	2007	89	—	—	—	24	Strange House
"Sea Within a Sea"	2009	—	—	—	—	—	Primary Colours
"Who Can Say"	2009	— (Note: "Who Can Say" did not enter the UK Singles Chart, but peaked at number 23 on the UK Physical Singles Chart.)	4	—	—	31	Primary Colours
"Mirror's Image"	2009	—	—	—	—	—	Primary Colours
"Whole New Way"	2009	— (Note: "Whole New Way" did not enter the UK Singles Chart, but peaked at number 80 on the UK Physical Singles Chart.)	— (Note: "Whole New Way" did not enter the UK Independent Singles Chart, but peaked at number 19 on the UK Independent Singles Breakers Chart.)	—	28	—	Primary Colours
"Still Life"	2011	63	7	85	34	64	Skying
"I Can See Through You"	2011	—	—	—	27	—	Skying
"Changing the Rain"	2012	—	—	—	42	—	Skying
"Motoring" / "Moving Further Away" (split with Toy)	2013	— (Note: "Motoring" / "Moving Further Away" did not enter the UK Singles Chart, but peaked at number 21 on the UK Physical Singles Chart.)	—	—	—	—	Non-album singles
"So Now You Know"	2014	137	8	—	26	—	Luminous
"I See You"	2014	—	—	—	35	—	Luminous
"Machine"	2017	—	—	—	—	—	V
"Something to Remember Me By"	2017	—	—	—	36	—	V
"Fire Escape" / "Water Drop"	2018	—	—	—	—	—	Non-album singles
"Lout"	2021	— (Note: "Lout" did not enter the UK Singles Chart, but peaked at number 44 on the UK Single Sales Chart.)	—	—	—	—	Lout EP
"Against the Blade"	2021	— (Note: "Against the Blade" did not enter the UK Singles Chart, but peaked at number 97 on the UK Single Sales Chart.)	—	—	—	—	Against the Blade EP
"The Silence that Remains"	2024	—	—	—	—	—	Night Life
"—" denotes releases that did not chart.

== Music videos ==
Year	Song	Director	Album
2006	"Sheena Is a Parasite"	Chris Cunningham	Strange House
2006	"Count in Fives"	Daniel Wolfe	Strange House
2006	"Count in Fives"	Tim Mattia	Strange House
2007	"Gloves"	Daniel Wolfe	Strange House
2007	"She Is the New Thing"	Corin Hardy	Strange House
2009	"Sea Within a Sea"	Douglas Hart	Primary Colours
2009	"Who Can Say"	Douglas Hart	Primary Colours
2009	"Mirror's Image"	Nicky Smith aka Weirdcore	Primary Colours
2009	"Whole New Way"	Dave Ma	Primary Colours
2011	"Still Life"	Ollie Murray	Skying
2011	"I Can See Through You"	White Rabbit	Skying
2012	"Changing the Rain"	Pete Fowler	Skying
2014	"So Now You Know"	Pulse Films	Luminous
2014	"Change Your Mind"	Lianne Pierce	Luminous
2017	"Machine"	Jon Emmony	V
2017	"Something to Remember Me By"	Max Weiland	V
2018	"Ghost"	in/out	V
2024	"The Silence that Remains"	Sarah Piantadosi	Night Life
