= The Duke of Burgundy (soundtrack) =

The Duke of Burgundy (Original Motion Picture Soundtrack)

Film score by Cat's Eyes
- Released: 16 February 2015
- Recorded: 2014–2015
- Genres: Film score; alternative pop; ambience
- Length: 35:22
- Labels: RAF; Caroline
- Producers: Faris Badwan; Rachel Zeffira; Peter Strickland

Cat's Eyes chronology
Cat's Eyes (2011)	The Duke of Burgundy (2015)	Treasure House (2016)

The Duke of Burgundy (Original Motion Picture Soundtrack) is the soundtrack to the 2014 film of the same name directed by Peter Strickland. Featuring the original music composed by the alternative pop duo Cat's Eyes, in their maiden film scoring debut, the album was released by RAF Records and Caroline Music Distribution on 16 February 2015, four days before the film's release. The music received critical acclaim and has been assessed as one of the best film scores of 2015.

== Development ==
The band members Faris Badwan and Rachel Zeffira, received the script for The Duke of Burgundy and wrote music for individual characters and themes. Once filming began, Peter Strickland sent references of the music he demanded, where he curated selections of classical compositions, giallo music, Mozart requiem, John Barry's James Bond Theme amongst others; the first selection was "I Knew It Was Over" from the band's self-titled debut studio album. Peter Strickland wanted the music to have humour, as well as "mournful, elegiac tone but not depressing" like Joy Division's album, and also provides an "autumnal feel, like things are coming to an end and going into hibernation" citing William Lawes' composition.

In some cases, the edit was set to temp music intending them to emulate the same atmosphere with these pieces. They cited an example of the Mozart requiem being used as a temp music for the film and discussed on the type he wanted to replace it. Hence, Zeffira came up writing and arranging a full choral requiem, that evening before the deadline.

While Zeffira wanted piano themes for the characters, Badwan wanted melancholic themes through oboe, harpsichord and flute; He further referred to the soundtracks of John Barry and Hungarian lullabies for the musical textures. Badwan admitted it as a "quite humorous film" as "there are a lot of little jokes. Creatively, the number one thing we appreciate is sensitivity, whether that's in editing, making music or painting or whatever. You really pick up on it when people are attuned to emotions, and how to convey emotion." The music wanted to act like an undercurrent, citing Brokeback Mountain (2005) where the score was minimalistic to become a part of the landscape.

"I always come back to Nino Rota, who did The Godfather soundtrack. He said if you're not communicating from the soul, your music will never last. His colleagues were very competitive to get respect and good reviews and they were all trying new things or copying Stockhausen. And Nino Rota just steadfastly stuck to beautiful melodies. He got made fun of for being over-sentimental and saccharine, but today you listen to his stuff and there's an immediate emotional connection. He said if you're not honest when you write there's just no point at all."

— Rachel Zeffira on the musical inspiration for The Duke of Burgundy

Both of them had different taste in the sonic palette, while the former wanted electronic music, the latter went for acoustic to bring "the human feeling". The duo further takes inspiration on how classical composers use lot of dissonance, as "ugly becomes beautiful", where Badwan admitted watching Miles Davis' performance on YouTube, he felt that "even when the music's really inaccessible he's still incredibly magnetic because he just looks like a complete psychopath". Badwan felt that ambiguous music was "important" for the film, as "music should be relative to the situation you're hearing it in". The instrumentation consisted from a range of Turkish instruments and oboe, but more on "creating an ambiguous sound as it makes an atmosphere, when you’re not really sure what a sound is sometimes".

Strickland insisted Zeffira to sing the vocals and not Badwan, as he wanted the film to be a "female-driven world". The score was partly recorded at Real World Studios, while other tracks were created at their home studio. Badwan and Zeffira watched the film several times to note down specific scenes to follow and subtle moments to draw attention to, which was different from a normal album.

== Live performance ==
Cat's Eyes performed the score live at the film's screening in Brighton Dome on May 22, 2015.

== Reception ==
Professional ratings
Aggregate scores
Source	Rating
Metacritic	82/100
Review scores
Source	Rating
MusicOMH	4/5 stars

Aggregator Metacritic, which uses a weighted average, assigned a score of 82 out of 100 based on 5 critics, indicating "universal acclaim".

In his five-star review for The Guardian, John Dennis summarised, "Orchestral textures, such as the eerie woodwind motifs of Moth and austere strings of Lamplight, conjure the darkly sexual charge of the film." Michael Bonner of Uncut summarised it as "staunch soundtrack work from Horrors’ side-project" giving 8/10 to the album. Tim Lee of MusicOMH also gave the same rating and wrote "Full of subtle moments of fragile beauty, this is a lush and sumptuous album. As soundtracks go, it is a very lovely one." A reviewer, from the now-defunct Q summarised "The gauzy production effects on Lamplight are among the few concessions to modernity, though the opening credits theme proper—where Zeffira breathily channels chanteuse Francoise Hardy—is hauntingly gorgeous." Sean Wilson of MFiles commented "a skilfully atmospheric, beautiful and emotional score that honours an oft-overlooked era of film music whilst forging its own distinct identity".

Music critic Jonathan Broxton of Movie Music UK commented, "The Duke of Burgundy is not a score I would go out of my way to review. The film is an arthouse slow burner, critically acclaimed but unlikely to pull much of an audience, while the score is by two composer/instrumentalists who most of my readers are unlikely to have even heard of, let alone considered purchasing music by. Nevertheless, something about this score got under my skin, tapped into the reflective and meditative part of my musical psyche, and impressed me greatly with its sensitivity, restraint, and quiet beauty. Anyone who knows and likes Morricone and Kilar’s European romance scores, or any of the soft-core erotica scores I mentioned earlier, will find much of this score to their liking, and those who don’t are urged to take a chance." Troy Lynch of Tenement TV gave the album a score of nine out of ten, commenting, "The Duke of Burgundy is a soundtrack with a level of skill and maturity far beyond their years. Being composed of The Horrors’ Faris Badwan and operatic vocalist Rachel Zeffira, the unlikely pairing has allowed the band’s unique sound. With the harpsichord and flute instrumentation setting the imagery, the electronic and classical backgrounds of the respective members has resulted in a soundtrack fraught with eerie claustrophobic tension and emotional substance."

IndieWire listed Duke of Burgundy's score as the "best film scores of 2015". The review complimented it as, "a lush, organic sonic scape, with prominent harpsichord, flute and oboe that fits the very particular world that Strickland has created like a glove. It conveys both the utter beauty of this universe and the darkness underneath."

== Track listing ==
No.	Title	Length
1.	"Forest Intro"	0:38
2.	"The Duke of Burgundy"	2:19
3.	"Moth"	1:29
4.	"Door No. 1"	1:11
5.	"Pavane"	0:58
6.	"Dr. Schuller"	0:13
7.	"Lamplight"	2:48
8.	"Door No. 2"	1:39
9.	"Carpenter Arrival"	3:33
10.	"Reflection"	1:43
11.	"Door No. 3"	1:39
12.	"Black Madonna"	1:49
13.	"Silkworm"	0:18
14.	"Evelyn's Birthday"	2:07
15.	"Evelyn's Birthday" (Flute Version)	1:52
16.	"Black Madonna" (Cor Anglais Version)	1:21
17.	"Night Crickets"	0:20
18.	"Requiem For the Duke of Burgundy"	4:36
19.	"Hautbois"	2:10
20.	"Coat of Arms"	2:48
