= Badwan (surname) =

Badwan (Arabic: بدوان) is a surname occurring especially in Palestine. Notable people with the surname include:

- Ali Saeed Badwan (1959–2025), Palestinian writer and political analyst based in Syria
- Faris Badwan (born 1986), English musician of Palestinian descent
- Nidaa Badwan (born 1987), Palestinian artist

== See also ==
- Loom (band), with vocalist Tarik Badwan
