= Night Life (The Horrors album) =

2025 studio album by the Horrors

Studio album by the Horrors
- Released: 21 March 2025
- Recorded: 2024–2025
- Studios: Holy Mountain Studios (London); The Bungalow at Sunset Sound (Los Angeles); Airbnb (Tottenham, London)
- Genres: Post-punk; industrial rock; electronic music; gothic rock
- Length: 45:09
- Label: Fiction
- Producer: Yves Rothman

The Horrors chronology
V (2017)	Night Life (2025)

Singles from Night Life
- 1. "The Silence That Remains" Released: 2 October 2024; 2. "Trial by Fire" Released: 31 October 2024; 3. "Lotus Eater" Released: 4 December 2024; 4. "More Than Life" Released: 17 January 2025; 5. "Ariel" Released: 21 February 2025

Night Life is the sixth studio album by English rock band the Horrors. It was released on 21 March 2025 by Fiction Records, marking the band's first studio album in eight years following V (2017). The album was the first by the band to feature keyboardist Amelia Kidd and drummer Jordan Cook, who joined founding members Faris Badwan, Rhys Webb and Joshua Hayward following the departures of keyboardist Tom Furse and drummer Joe Spurgeon.

The album was preceded by the singles "The Silence That Remains", "Trial by Fire" and "More Than Life". Its nine tracks incorporate elements of post-punk, industrial music, electronic music and dark rock, with a greater emphasis on electronic instrumentation and programmed rhythms than some of the band's earlier work.

Night Life received generally favourable reviews from music critics. It reached number 16 on the UK Albums Chart, becoming the band's sixth UK top-40 album, while reaching number 5 on the UK Albums Chart Update and number 3 on the UK Physical Albums and Vinyl Albums charts.

== Background ==
Following the release of V in 2017, The Horrors underwent a period of significant change. Keyboardist Tom Furse announced in 2021 that he would take a break from performing with the band, explaining that he was more interested in making music than performing it. The band subsequently continued without Furse as a four-piece, while also releasing the Lout and Against the Blade EPs in 2021.

The writing of Night Life began before the band's eventual line-up had been established. Vocalist Faris Badwan and bassist Rhys Webb wrote the majority of the album together, with much of the early material developed at Webb's flat in North London, which had become an informal base for the band. Badwan described the pair as having the album largely written before Amelia Kidd and Jordan Cook became members of the group.

The approach represented another change in the band's songwriting process. Whereas The Horrors had originally learned to write by playing together as a five-piece, they had increasingly adopted smaller writing groups during the production of their later albums. The remote-working conditions of the COVID-19 pandemic had further encouraged this approach during the creation of the band's 2021 EPs. For Night Life, Badwan and Webb worked primarily as a duo, developing songs electronically before taking them into the studio.

The departure of drummer Joe Spurgeon occurred during the early stages of the album's recording. Spurgeon initially participated in the sessions but subsequently decided that he could not commit to the entire recording process. In a later interview, Badwan and Webb described the departure as a natural change rather than the result of a disagreement. Webb noted that the financial uncertainty created by the COVID-19 pandemic had required musicians to consider other ways of supporting themselves, while Spurgeon had also become a father.

The band initially continued the recording with session musicians. Jordan Cook, formerly of the band Telegram and a long-time friend and collaborator of The Horrors, subsequently became involved. Webb had previously worked with Cook on other projects, while Telegram had toured with The Horrors. Badwan said that he had found it difficult to find drummers whose playing suited the band, but that Cook's familiarity with the group meant that he was able to join without difficulty.

Keyboardist Amelia Kidd became involved during the development of the album. Kidd had been working with Badwan on her own debut solo record when she began contributing to Night Life. Badwan described her contribution as providing the additional element the album needed, particularly through her use of textures, chopped-up rhythms and resampled sounds.

The new members consequently became part of the creative process rather than simply replacing former members for live performances. Badwan described the resulting line-up as a "different gang", while noting that the additional musicians gave the band greater freedom to experiment. Kidd contributed production and sound design during the Los Angeles sessions, while Cook's drumming was subsequently incorporated into the finished recordings.

== Release and promotion ==
Night Life was announced on 2 October 2024 by Fiction Records, with a release date of 21 March 2025. The announcement was accompanied by the release of "The Silence That Remains", the album's first single. The band also announced a series of intimate UK performances to take place in November and December 2024.

"The Silence That Remains" was released on 2 October 2024 and was accompanied by a music video. The song features vocals from Faris Badwan and Amelia Kidd and was described by the band as a "3am insomnia walk through the city".

"Trial by Fire" was released on 31 October 2024 as the second single from the album.

"Lotus Eater" was released on 4 December 2024 as the third single. At more than seven minutes, it was the longest track on the album. The song had undergone several versions during its development before the final arrangement was completed.

"More Than Life" was released on 17 January 2025 as the fourth single from the album. The song was written in Canary Wharf and was co-written with Jess Winter.

"Ariel" was released on 21 February 2025 as the fifth and final single preceding the album. The song served as the album's opening track and was described by the band as marking "the beginning of a new chapter". It was accompanied by a music video directed by Sarah Piantadosi.

The album was released on 21 March 2025. To coincide with the release, The Horrors performed a series of UK in-store appearances at record shops and venues, followed by concerts in Spain and Portugal and an appearance at the Dot to Dot Festival in May.

== Music and themes ==
Night Life marked a further change in The Horrors' musical direction. Contemporary descriptions of the album identified elements of post-punk, industrial rock, electronic music and dark rock, with the band reducing the prominence of the shoegaze and psychedelic elements that had characterised portions of their earlier work.

The album makes extensive use of bass-driven rhythms, programmed and processed drums, synthesizers and restrained guitar parts. NME described the record as moving away from the pedal-heavy guitars and prominent synthesizers of some of the band's previous releases in favour of moody basslines, processed drums and Badwan's restrained baritone vocals.

The album's title reflects the contrasting experiences of Badwan and Webb. In an interview, Badwan explained that Webb's experience of the night was more social and connected, whereas his own was more introspective. This contrast informed the album's recurring sense of alienation and isolation.

Webb described the album as being concerned with the relationship between different musical elements and the use of space, while Badwan's vocals were recorded more frequently within his natural vocal range. The band considered this approach to have produced a more personal and emotionally connected record.

The final track, "LA Runaway", was deliberately positioned as an optimistic conclusion to the album. Webb described the sequencing as important to the band's conception of the album as a complete listening experience, with the song representing the end of the journey and "the light at the end of the tunnel".

== Critical reception ==
Night Life received generally favourable reviews from music critics. On Metacritic, which assigns a normalised rating out of 100 to reviews from mainstream publications, the album received a score of 78 based on 11 reviews, indicating "generally favorable reviews". Nine reviews were classified as positive and two as mixed.

NME's Tom Morgan described Night Life as an "engrossing nocturnal stunner", highlighting the album's combination of moody basslines, processed drums and restrained vocals. He praised "Ariel" and "The Silence That Remains" in particular, while considering "Trial by Fire" less atmospheric than the album's strongest material.

DIY gave the album a score of 80/100, praising Badwan's vocals and describing the record as engaging with contemporary violence and chaos.

Clash also awarded the album 80/100, describing its atmosphere as capturing a sense of "in-betweenness" and the experience of being awake alone in a post-apocalyptic environment.

Mojo awarded the album 80/100, noting its dark electronic character and comparing elements of its sound to film music. Uncut gave the album 70/100 and described it as a more electronic record while noting that the band retained its ability to produce an intense rock sound.

Beats Per Minute rated the album 77/100, praising its dense compositions and production and suggesting that its sonic qualities represented some of the band's strongest work since Skying.

Record Collector awarded the album 60/100, describing it as dark rock with influences that could appeal to listeners familiar with groups such as The Psychedelic Furs, The Sisters of Mercy and Depeche Mode. Under the Radar gave it 55/100, offering a more mixed assessment of the album's vocal-heavy approach.

== Track listing ==
All tracks are written by The Horrors, except where noted.

No.	Title	Length
1	"Ariel"	5:24
2	"Silent Sister"	4:38
3	"The Silence That Remains"	5:43
4	"Trial by Fire"	4:00
5	"The Feeling Is Gone"	4:05
6	"Lotus Eater"	7:13
7	"More Than Life"	5:33
8	"When the Rhythm Breaks"	3:20
9	"LA Runaway"	5:06

The album has a total running time of approximately 44 minutes and 58 seconds.

== Personnel ==
Credits are adapted from physical-release credits and supporting album documentation.

=== The Horrors ===
- Faris Badwan – vocals, synthesizer, programming
- Rhys Webb – bass, guitar, synthesizer, programming
- Joshua Hayward (credited as Joshua Third) – guitar, organ
- Amelia Kidd – vocals, synthesizer, programming
- Jordan Cook – drums

=== Additional musicians ===
- Victor Indrizzo – drums
- Yves Rothman – synthesizer, bass, programming

=== Production ===
- Yves Rothman – producer, executive producer
- Stan Gravett – recording engineer
- Iain Gore – recording engineer
- Nate Haessly – recording engineer
- Craig Silvey – mixing
- Max Prior – mixing
- Dani Bennett-Spragg – mixing
- Felix Davis – mastering

== Charts ==
Chart (2025)	Peak position
UK Albums Chart	16
Scottish Albums Chart	5
UK Album Downloads Chart	8
UK Albums Sales Chart	3
UK Independent Albums Chart	3
UK Physical Albums Chart	3
UK Vinyl Albums Chart	3
UK Record Store Chart	3
