= Sea Within a Sea =

Single by The Horrors

from the album Primary Colours
- Released: 17 March 2009
- Recorded: 2008
- Genre: Post-punk; neo-psychedelia; krautrock; shoegazing
- Length: 8:00
- Label: XL
- Songwriter(s): Faris Badwan; Tom Cowan; Joshua Hayward; Rhys Webb; Joseph Spurgeon
- Producer(s): Geoff Barrow

The Horrors singles chronology
| "Count in Fives" (2006) | "Sea Within a Sea" (2009) | "I Can See Through You" (2011) |

Music video
- "Sea Within a Sea" on YouTube

"Sea Within a Sea" is a song by English rock band the Horrors, released on 17 March 2009 by XL Recordings as a single from their second studio album, Primary Colours.

== Critical reception ==
"Sea Within a Sea" has been viewed as the Horrors' shift from the garage rock of their 2007 debut album, Strange House. Jacob Sheppard of DIY magazine examined the song as the group's "new direction", where they "take on a more mature sound; more electronic, bass heavy and psychedelic", hailing it as a "Neu! sounding, shoe-gazing seven-minute masterpiece". Similarly, Cam Lindsay from Exclaim! magazine has regarded the track as "an eight-minute beauty that discards the raucous trashed garage of old" and "sinister throwback sound in deep krautrock trances and '60s psychedelia whilst still managing to hold on to their spooky shtick".

Many music writers and critics have stated that the song combines influences from krautrock, post-punk and Portishead (the previous band of the single's producer, Geoff Barrow). Johnathan Garrett of Pitchfork described the song as an "oddly muzaked take on krautrock"; however, he commented that the track was "weirdly restrained" and "the Horrors can't even be bothered to leave an impression". Sean O'Neal of the A.V. Club depicted that the song's instrumentation "drowns its post-punk ebbs in sprays of crashing guitar before being carried out on a sparkling tide of minimalist electronic pulses". Music writer Dorian Lynskey of the Guardian claimed the single as "ascendant krautrock - Can by way of the last Portishead album", praising it as "several kinds of wonderful". Prefix magazine explained that the song "perfectly connects with Portishead touchstones such as Neu!, Can and Kraftwerk" and is a "glacial eight-minute groove that only gets better as its parts disentangle". Emily Tartanella from PopMatters expressed that the lead single was "miles away from anything they’ve done before", outlining that "like Ian Curtis fronting the Cure, it’s mysterious, languid, and just a little bit spooky." NME magazine described the song as "an eight-minute Spacemen 3-meets-Neu! odyssey of ominous motorik rhythms, Faris' mournful incantations and an expanding starfield of synths". In October 2011, NME placed it at number 101 on its list "150 Best Tracks of the Past 15 Years".

== Music video ==
The music video for the song was directed by Douglas Hart, former bassist of Scottish alternative rock band the Jesus and Mary Chain. Hart integrated old production methods and special effects to forge a psychedelic and colourful eight-minute video, creating a similar atmosphere to live performances of the Velvet Underground at the Factory. Hart stated that "the challenge becomes how to create something psychedelic without resorting to the cliché of trapping the band in a giant lava lamp".

The video starts with a presenter seated in an armchair, introducing the Horrors. The intent was to recreate the situation of bands "performing on the kind of shows that they didn't fit in" with a presenter "who obviously hated the band" in order to build up excitement to the performance. This idea was primarily inspired by Public Image Ltd's performance on American Bandstand in 1980.

Hart processed magnets around a TV with a cathode ray tube that illustrated images of architecture and colourful polka dots. These pictures were then re-shot for projection. Subsequently, the magnets bent the cathode rays elsewhere from the screen, along a magnetic field, and created variations with the vibrant colours. This production technique was utilized by early video artists since machines that colourised video images had not yet been invented. The projected images were developed and created on Final Cut Pro and Adobe After Effects.
