= Count in Fives =

Single by The Horrors

from the album Strange House
- A-side: "Count in Fives"
- B-side: "Who Says?"; "A Knife in Their Eye"
- Released: 30 October 2006
- Genre: Post-punk revival
- Length: 2:42
- Label: Loog
- Songwriter(s): Faris Badwan, Tom Cowan, Joshua Hayward, Joseph Spurgeon, Rhys Webb

The Horrors singles chronology
"Sheena Is a Parasite" (2006)	"Count in Fives" (2006)	"Sea Within a Sea" (2009)

"Count in Fives" is a song by English rock band the Horrors, released in October 2006 by Loog Records as a single from their debut album, Strange House.

== Content ==
The song is about vocalist Faris Badwan's childhood obsession with arranging things in groups of five. The B-side, "A Knife in Their Eye", featured lyrics written by Badwan set to music by the Monks.

== Music video ==
The music video featured people using sign language to "act out" the music and lyrics of the song. A minor controversy erupted when it was discovered that part of the song (the intro and verse) was an uncredited replica of We the People's "My Brother, the Man".

== Release ==
Like other singles by the band, it could not chart as it came packaged with stickers.

== Reception ==
Mojo described the single as a "glorious piece of Farfisa organ-led madness". Drowned in Sound's Dom Gourlay wrote: "if I was sixteen again, I'd be going nuts for something like this, particularly so in the current climate of market-orientated alternative music like the Kooks, the Feeling and Razorlight. For that reason alone, The Horrors are as important as anything else you care to mention at this moment in time: 'Count in Fives' is loud, fast, sharp and exciting, if not exactly new – you can find this sort of thing on any retrospective Pebbles _or Nuggets _compilation of the last 40 years – yet at the same time there's no one else out there making a similar racket, or indeed impact, in such a short space of time."

== Track listing ==
7" 1

1. "Count in Fives"
2. "Who Says?"

7" 2

1. "Count in Fives"
2. "A Knife in Their Eye"
