= The Horrors (EP) =

2006 EP by the Horrors

EP by The Horrors
- Released: 24 October 2006
- Recorded: 2006
- Genre: Garage punk
- Length: 12:00
- Label: Stolen Transmission
- Producer: Seb Lewsley; Jim Wilson; Dimitri Tikovoi

The Horrors chronology
The Horrors (2006)	Strange House (2007)

We Are The Horrors EP
- Japanese and Australian alternative cover

The Horrors (also known as We Are the Horrors) is the debut EP by English rock band the Horrors, released on 24 October 2006 by record label Stolen Transmission. It consists of the A- and B-sides to the two singles previously released by the band: "Death at the Chapel" and "Sheena Is a Parasite".

== Content ==
"Crawdaddy Simone" is a cover of a 1965 single by the Syndicats (featuring Ray Fenwick), produced by Joe Meek.

== Release ==
The Horrors was released on 24 October 2006 by record label Stolen Transmission. At first it was only released in America, but was eventually released in the UK. A slightly different version with a white cover was released in Japan and Australia.

== Reception ==
Professional ratings
Review scores
Source	Rating
AllMusic	3.5/5 stars
Pitchfork	6.6/10
PopMatters	8/10

The Horrors was generally well received by critics.

Heather Phares of AllMusic wrote, "Even without the eye candy, their music holds up well; this self-titled EP, which collects the songs from their U.K. singles from spring and summer 2006, is a very entertaining snapshot of their high-style horror-punk." Stuart Berman of Pitchfork wrote, "When compared to typical Brit indie-tabloid fashionista fare, they're a refreshingly lewd and crude anomaly. For all their sartorial extravagance, the Horrors are studious garage-punk purists who like it raw to the bone."

== Track listing ==
1. "Death at the Chapel"
2. "Crawdaddy Simone"
3. "Sheena Is a Parasite"
4. "Jack the Ripper"
5. "Excellent Choice"
6. "Sheena Is a Parasite" (video)
