= S.C.U.M =

South East London-based post-punk/art rock band

- Origin: South East London, England
- Genres: Art rock; post-punk revival; psychedelic rock; shoegaze
- Years active: 2008–2013
- Label: Mute
- Past members: Thomas Cohen; Bradley Baker; Samuel Kilcoyne; Ruarridh Connellan; Joseph Williams; Huw Webb; Melissa Rigby

S.C.U.M were a South East London-based post-punk/art rock band. Its members were Thomas Cohen (vocals), Bradley Baker (machines, press), Samuel Kilcoyne (keyboards), Huw Webb (bass), and Melissa Rigby (drums). The band previously included Ruaridh Connellan (drums) Thomas Clark (Drums) and Joseph Williams (bass, media). S.C.U.M took their name from Valerie Solanas' manifesto, SCUM Manifesto, an ironic reference to the all-male band before Connellan's dismissal and replacement by Rigby.

== History ==
S.C.U.M formed in early 2008 with its initial line-up consisting of Thomas Cohen, Bradley Baker, Samuel Kilcoyne (founder of the Underage club nights and the festival spin-off as well as the son of Add N to X's Barry 7), drummer Ruaridh Connellan, and bassist Joseph Williams who left early on in the band's career due to his desire to become a barrister.

S.C.U.M's debut single, "Visions Arise", was released on Loog Records on 15 September 2008. Since then the band have toured extensively across the UK and Europe to a growing fan base and released three exclusive digital download tracks called SIGNALS. While S.C.U.M were travelling across Europe performing shows, they were taking studio time in each city they visited to record new works specific to each location. The music documented their sonic journey and acted as an audio visual scrapbook of the bands travels and musical progression. S.C.U.M have recorded a series of "SIGNALS" in Warsaw, Poland; Berlin, Germany; Paris, France; and Athens, Greece. Paris was the most extreme of these with the band describing it as a painting of their minds at the time. Cohen later said, "'Paris' was the one that started it; I just remember taking to bed one night after contemplating the early Dada artists and the lyrics came to me in a screen of emotion signals". They were featured and interviewed in the April 2010 edition of Mojo.

S.C.U.M were chosen by Portishead to perform at the ATP I'll Be Your Mirror festival that they curated in July 2011 at London's Alexandra Palace. On 18 July 2011, the single entitled "Amber Hands" was released by Mute Records and was described by Pitchfork as "the mammoth first single from the London shoegazers".

The band recorded their debut album with producers Ken and Jolyon Thomas whose production credits (individually and together) include David Bowie, Public Image Ltd, Sigur Ros, and Psychic TV among others. The album, Again into Eyes, was released on 12 September 2011 via Mute Records and received generally positive reviews with a 7.3 rating from aggregating website, AnyDecentMusic?.

On 27 August 2012, Rough Trade exclusively released what they dubbed a "lost EP" by the band. The limited edition run of 300 7" vinyl was recorded at 1-2-3-4 HQ studios in East London and intended as a self-release. However, due to a mix-up at the pressing plant, the vinyl went missing. A recent clear-out of a storage cupboard revealed the metalwork for the pressing and it was returned to the band who approached Rough Trade about releasing it.

On 12 January 2013, S.C.U.M announced via Facebook that they were splitting up after their long hiatus. They also made hints of solo projects to come soon.

In June 2013, it was announced that former members Melissa Rigby, Huw Webb, and Bradley Baker had undertaken a new project named Astral Pattern. The dream pop band released a first single, "Sitting in the Sun", and that an EP titled Light Poems would be released shortly.

== Musical style and influences ==
S.C.U.M have claimed that they are not influenced by anyone musically, though they have spoken of a love for Throbbing Gristle, Ghost and Liars. Commenting on some British tabloids' calling him "a pretentious rocker", Cohen said: "It's because we don't make music about social issues so it comes across as unsocial and therefore pretentious. Which is rubbish." The band have stated in interviews that some of their songs deal with emotional fluctuations caused by visual manifestations of coloured shapes representing repressed lust. The band's post-punk revival sound as well as the fact that Huw Webb is the brother of Rhys Webb from The Horrors has led to many comparisons between the bands and, with TOY, they have been dubbed "baby Horrors" by some negative critics.

== Discography ==
=== Singles ===
Name	Release date	Label
"Visions Arise"	15 September 2008	Loog/Polydor
"Amber Hands"	18 July 2011	Mute
"Whitechapel"	26 September 2011	Mute
"Faith Unfolds"	2 January 2012	Mute

=== Albums ===
Name	Release date	Label	UK chart peak
Again into Eyes	12 September 2011	Mute	No. 192

Astral Pattern

Name	Release date	Label	UK chart peak
Light Poems EP	1 July 2013	37 Adventures	

Blueprint Blue

Name	Release date	Label	UK chart peak
Undertoad EP	5 May 2014	Italian Beach Babes	
Flying Machine EP	9 March 2017	Luv Luv Luv	

Thomas Cohen (solo)

Name	Release date	Label	UK chart peak
Bloom Forever	6 May 2016	Stolen Recordings	
