= Primary Colors =

Primary Colors may refer to:

- Primary color, sets of colors that can be combined to make a useful range of colors

== Books and films ==
- Primary Colors (novel), a 1996 novel by Joe Klein
- Primary Colors (film), a 1998 film based on the novel

== Music ==
- Primary Colors (album), by Day After Tomorrow (2004)
- Primary Colours (The Horrors album) (2009)
- Primary Colours (Eddy Current Suppression Ring album) (2008)
- Primary Colors (soundtrack) music by Ry Cooder
- Primary Colours (Magic! album), a 2016 album by MAGIC!
- "Primary Colours", song by The Horrors from the album Primary Colors and the B-side of the single "Whole New Way"
