= Cat's Eyes (album) =

Studio album by Cat's Eyes
- Released: 11 April 2011
- Recorded: The Loft, London
- Genre: Alternative rock, experimental rock
- Length: 28:10
- Language: English
- Label: Polydor
- Producer: Steve Osborne

Cat's Eyes chronology
| Broken Glass (2011) | Cat's Eyes (2011) | Treasure House (2016) |

Singles from Cat's Eyes
- 1. "Face in the Crowd" / "Bandit" Released: 9 May 2011; 2. "Over You" / "The Crying Game" Released: 25 July 2011

Professional ratings
Review scores
| Source | Rating |
|---|---|
| AllMusic | 4/5 stars |
| BBC Music | (favourable) |
| Drowned in Sound | (8/10) |
| The Guardian | 4/5 stars |
| NME | (8/10) |
| Pitchfork | (7.9/10.0) |

Cat's Eyes is the self-titled debut album by London-based alternative pop duo Cat's Eyes, released on April 11, 2011 on the Polydor record label.

The album featured the songs "Cat's Eyes" and "The Best Person I Know", which previously appeared on the group's Broken Glass EP, along with eight other tracks including "The Lull" (which the band noted was the first song they wrote for the project).

The album was dedicated to the memory of Charlie Haddon of electronica band Ou Est Le Swimming Pool, who committed suicide in August 2010 at Pukkelpop festival in Belgium. Badwan of Cat's Eyes was a friend of Haddon's, and his full-time band The Horrors played at his memorial gig in London.

Mojo placed the album at No. 13 on its list of "Top 50 albums of 2011."

== Track listing ==
| No. | Title | Length |
|---|---|---|
| 1. | "Cat's Eyes" | 2:38 |
| 2. | "The Best Person I Know" | 3:10 |
| 3. | "I'm Not Stupid" | 2:58 |
| 4. | "Face in the Crowd" | 2:49 |
| 5. | "Not a Friend" | 2:11 |
| 6. | "Bandit" | 3:03 |
| 7. | "Sooner or Later" | 3:59 |
| 8. | "The Lull" | 2:40 |
| 9. | "Over You" | 2:31 |
| 10. | "I Knew it was Over" | 2:15 |

== Personnel ==
Musicians

- Faris Badwan – vocals, guitar, Vox Jaguar Organ, synthesizers
- Rachel Zeffira – vocals, oboe, cor anglais, violin, viola, piano, vibraphone, harmonium, Vox Jaguar Organ, synthesizers

Production

- Joe Jones – engineering
- Steve Osborne – production, engineering
- Tom Dalgety – engineering
- Andrew Dudman – orchestra engineering,
- Kevin Metclafe – mastering
