= Hatcham Social =

- Origin: New Cross, London, England
- Years active: 2006–present
- Labels: WaKs Records; PopGrooves; Loog Records; Vinyl Junkie (Japan); TBD Records (USA); MapleMusic Recordings (Canada); Fierce Panda
- Members: Finnigan Kidd; Toby Kidd; James Maynard Fry
- Past members: Dave Fineberg; Jerome Watson; David Claxton; Riley Difford; Rachel Kenedy; Joanna Curwood
- Website: Hatcham Social's Official Website

Hatcham Social are an English indie pop band. The group first met and formed in New Cross, London in 2006 and have since released a string of singles on indie labels, followed by three studio albums. With the debut album, they made headway in the mainstream media with The Guardian describing them as "irrestistible" and Tim Burgess (The Charlatans) calling them "a wonderful pop group with the world's coolest drummer."

The band is named partially after the Hatcham Liberal club on Queens Road, Peckham, and the Old English word 'Hatcham', meaning 'a clearing in the woods'. The Hatcham Liberal club was well known as 'Hatcham Social' around the time the band formed. The area in which it lies was, in previous times, known as Hatcham.

Their debut album You Dig the Tunnel, I'll Hide the Soil was released in March 2009 in the UK, followed by the album About Girls in 2012. The third album Cutting Up the Present Leaks Out the Future was released on Ogenisis in February 2014, and their fourth and most recent album, The Birthday of the World, was released on Crocodile Records in 2015.

== History ==
Hatcham Social formed in New Cross in 2006 when David Fineberg met brothers Toby and Finnigan Kidd. Drummer Finnigan Kidd was still a member of Klaxons, but left in order to devote his time to Hatcham Social; they soon released their self-recorded debut 7-inch single "Dance as If..." on the indie label WaKs Records (Daniel Devine). After showing considerable interest and forming a friendship with the band, Faris Badwan of The Horrors (a former art student at Central Saint Martins) agreed to create the artwork for the band's second single, "How Soon Was Then?", released on PopGrooves (the label set up by David Fineberg); the artwork to the single was hand-printed on 200 limited edition 7" sleeves. The single gave the band their first national radio airplay on the BBC 6Music show Mint, hosted by Marc Riley, in January 2007.

Tim Burgess of The Charlatans, produced the band's next single, the double A-side of "Til the Dawn" and "Penelope (Under My Hat)". Both sides of the single were recorded with Burgess, for whom this was his production debut. Again, artwork was provided by Faris Badwan. Artrocker described the single as a "polka-dot-skirt-swirling number with credibility" whilst Dazed & Confused saw it as "carefree and irresistibly catchy." The success of the single prompted BBC 6Music DJ Gideon Coe to invite the band in for their first live radio session on Tuesday 14 August 2007, whilst the Queens of Noize chose "Penelope (Under My Hat)" as their "trophy track" on their BBC 6 Music show on 4 August 2007. Artrocker magazine also asked the band to perform a live radio session for them, and used one of the live tracks "Snap My Hands" on their cover mounted free CD in December 2007.

The band's growing friendship with Badwan saw him switching from design to production for Hatcham's next single, "So So Happy Making". The single was released as a joint venture between Loog Records and Waks Records. Artrocker described the single as a "wonderful, life-affirming record" whilst the NME proclaimed "twee-tastic basement recorded pop shouldn't be starting a south London revolution, but it is." Vice described it as "one of the best things we've heard all year", and Time Out magazine chose the self-recorded B-side, "Berlin", as one of their 'Picks of the Week', likening the band to The Pop Group, Josef K and Virgin Prunes. The relative success of the single was proven when it reached number 14 in the Official Independent Singles Chart on 9 March 2008.

Growing recognition has seen Hatcham Social headline a show at London's 100 Club in February 2008, and they have played the Camden Crawl, Great Escape and Dot to Dot music festivals in London, Brighton, Bristol and Nottingham, as well as Faraday in Barcelona, London Calling in Amsterdam and Lovebox in London.

Their debut album, entitled You Dig the Tunnel, I'll Hide the Soil was produced by Tim Burgess and Jim Spencer and released in March 2009 through Fierce Panda in the UK and TBD Records in the US. It was critically acclaimed and received 10/10 in Vice magazine, 8/10 in NME and Album of the Month in Artrocker. It was included in many top 20 albums of the year lists, and the single "Crocodile" was the Single of the Year 2009 in Artrocker.

Second album About Girls was released in April 2012 and recorded with Jim Anderson (Transgressive, Cold Specks), Laurie Latham (Echo and the Bunnymen, Squeeze) and some of the album was produced and mixed entirely by the band at Helcion Mountain in London and Drummers Hill in Wales. It received an equally good reception: Loud and Quiet: "full of nagging hits"; NME: "a stunner"; Steve Lamacq (6 Music/Radio 2) "...pure indie pop brilliance"; BBC America: "one of the top 5 UK bands to see at SXSW"; The Quietus: "loving Hatcham Social’s new direction."

"Like an Animal" was the first taster track to be released off of the second LP and was given away as a free download from the band's Bandcamp page. It was limited to 500 free downloads and then went on to being available to buy. Artrocker said the single was "awesome" and gave it a five star rating.

The third studio album Cutting Up the Present Leaks Out the Future was released in February 2014. Recorded and produced by the band themselves in a 12-day stint in a studio in Wales, they recorded onto reel to reel tape, using a computer only at mixdown stage. Q magazine called the album a "career high" and "a thrilling dark night of the soul", awarding it 4 stars out of 5.

A fourth studio album The Birthday of the World was released in October 2015 via Crocodile Records.

A career-spanning compilation We Are the Weirdos was released in April 2022 on Fierce Panda as a collection of best and lost singles as well as featuring remixes from Tim Burgess and Baxter Dury.

== Influences and sound ==
Hatcham Social derive heavy influence from indie pop of the 1980s including bands such as The Pastels, Orange Juice and Josef K, as well as post-punk and shoegaze bands such as The Jesus & Mary Chain and The Fall. Their music (particularly their early singles) also features a 1960s beat music influence, including the pop sensibility of The Kinks.

They have also taken an influence from story books and children's literature, most notably through their rendition of the Lewis Carroll poem "Jabberwocky", which they performed live at their 100 Club gig with a performing arts group, SKIPtheatre (they also made a brief appearance in the music video to "So So Happy Making"). The band's love of story books and children's literature (and as a nod to the 1980s) influenced them in choosing to release two cassette tapes of their self-recorded material, Found in the Woods (versions 1 & 2). The first edition brought together the five tracks on their first two vinyl only singles, and was released on 25 May 2007. The second edition brought together six other previously unreleased self-recorded tracks, and was released on 31 December 2007.

== Associated artists ==
Hatcham have frequently played with bands including The Violets, Neils Children, and Electricity in Our Homes, and are associated with The Horrors and The Charlatans (whom they have supported in a number of concerts) through their work with Faris Badwan and Tim Burgess. Finnigan Kidd, as well as having drummed for Klaxons before concentrating on Hatcham Social, is also a part-time member of the indie rock supergroup collective The Chavs. Hatcham Social have also played and been associated with The Pains of Being Pure at Heart, Crystal Stilts, Veronica Falls, The Maccabees and Cold Specks.

== Discography ==
=== Studio albums ===
Year	Title	Format	Label
2009	You Dig the Tunnel, I'll Hide the Soil	CD, download	Fierce Panda (UK) TBD Records (US)
2012	About Girls	CD, download	Fierce Panda
2014	Cutting Up the Present Leaks Out the Future	CD, download, vinyl	Ogenesis Records
2015	The Birthday of the World	CD, download, vinyl	Crocodile Records

=== Compilations ===
Year	Title	Format	Label
2022	We Are the Weirdos	Download, vinyl	Fierce Panda

=== EPs ===
Year	Title	Format	Label
2007	Found in the Woods (edition 1)	Cassette	PopGrooves
2007	Found in the Woods (edition 2)	Cassette	PopGrooves
2008	Party	mp3 download	PopGrooves
2008	Crystal World (Japan only)	CD	Vinyl Junkie
2009	Postcard in Colours (US and Canada only)	CD	TBD Records

=== Singles ===
Year	Title	Format	Label
2006	"Dance As If…" / "Catch Me If You Can (You Can't)"	7"	WaKS Records
2006	"How Soon Was Then?" / "Land of Maybe" / "Rhinoceros" (DJ Sinjin Mix)	7"	PopGrooves
2007	"Til the Dawn" / "Penelope (Under My Hat)"	7", download	WaKS Records
2008	"So So Happy Making" / "Berlin"	7", CD	Loog Records
2009	"Murder in the Dark" / "Mimicry"	7", download	Fierce Panda
2009	"Crocodile" / "Dissected"	7", download	Fierce Panda
2009	"Sidewalk"	10" (Ltd.100)	Fierce Panda
2011	"Like an Animal"	Download only (Ltd.500)	Fierce Panda
2012	"You Look Like a God When You Dance with Me"	Download only	Fierce Panda
2012	"Lois Lane"	Download only	Fierce Panda
2013	"More Power to Live" / "Ketamine Queen"	Free download	O Genesis
2014	"Lion with a Laser Gun" / "Confessions of an English Opium Smoker"	Download only	O Genesis
2021	"If You Go Down to the Woods Today (Three Cheers For Our Side)"	Download only	Fierce Panda
