= Broken Glass =

Broken Glass may refer to:

- Broken Glass (play), by Arthur Miller
- Broken Glass (band), a British rock band
- Broken Glass (album), by American band Crowbar
- Broken Glass (EP), an EP by Cat's Eyes
- "Broken Glass" (Kygo and Kim Petras song), 2020
- "Broken Glass" (Rachel Platten song), 2017
- "Broken Glass", a song from the 2005 album 15 by Buckcherry
- "Broken Glass", a song from the 2004 album Legion of Boom by The Crystal Method
- "Broken Glass", a song from the 2025 album This Consequence by Killswitch Engage
- "Broken Glass", a song from the 2024 album Older by Lizzy McAlpine
- "Broken Glass", a song from the 2025 album Virgin by Lorde
- "Broken Glass", a song from the 2016 album This Is Acting by Sia Furler
- "Broken Glass", a song from the 2012 album Transit Of Venus by Three Days Grace

== See also ==
- Kristallnacht ("Night of Broken Glass")
- "Walking on Broken Glass", a song by Annie Lennox
- Breaking glass (disambiguation)
- Shattered glass (disambiguation)
