= You Dig the Tunnel, I'll Hide the Soil =

Studio album by Hatcham Social
- Released: 16 March 2009
- Recorded: 2008–2009
- Genre: Indie pop, alternative rock
- Label: Fierce Panda Records
- Producer: Tim Burgess, Faris Badwan

Professional ratings
Review scores
Source	Rating
NME	4/5 stars
Vice	(10/10)
Artrocker	(Very Favourable)
BBC Music	(Favourable)
The Guardian	3/5 stars

You Dig the Tunnel, I'll Hide the Soil is the debut album by Hatcham Social, released on 16 March 2009 on Fierce Panda Records in the UK and TBD Records in the US.

== Track listing ==
1. "Crocodile" (3:04)
2. "Sidewalk" (4:26)
3. "Murder in the Dark" (2:53)
4. "Hypnotise Terrible Eyes" (2:17)
5. "So So Happy Making" (2:43)
6. "Superman" (2:18)
7. "I Cannot Cure My Pure Evil" (2:51)
8. "Jabberwocky" (2:20)
9. "In My Opinion" (3:12)
10. "Penelope (Under My Hat)" (2:39)
11. "Give Me the Gift" (4:20)

== Notes ==
Tim Burgess produced all songs apart from "So So Happy Making" which was produced by Faris "Rotter" Badwan of The Horrors.
