= Broken Glass (EP) =

EP by Cat's Eyes
- Released: 27 February 2011
- Genre: Alternative rock, experimental rock
- Length: 12:27
- Label: Polydor
- Producer: Steve Osborne

Cat's Eyes chronology
| Broken Glass (2011) | Cat's Eyes (2011) |

Broken Glass is an EP released by alternative pop duo Cat's Eyes in 2011 on the Polydor record label, both as a download and two limited edition 7" singles in a gatefold sleeve.

The EP featured three original compositions by the band – "Cat's Eyes", "The Best Person I Know" (which would both later appear on the band's debut album, Cat's Eyes) and "Love You Anyway" – along with the track "Sunshine Girls", a song written by vocalist Faris Badwan's full-time band The Horrors that never went beyond demo stage.

== Track listing ==
| No. | Title | Length |
|---|---|---|
| 1. | "Cat's Eyes" | 2:39 |
| 2. | "The Best Person I Know" | 3:11 |
| 3. | "Sunshine Girls" | 3:56 |
| 4. | "Love You Anyway" | 2:44 |

== Personnel ==
- Faris Badwan
- Rachel Zeffira
