= Breaking glass =

Breaking glass is the action of damaging or destroying a glass object. It may also refer to:

== Arts and media ==
=== Film and television ===
- Breaking Glass, a 1980 musical film starring Hazel O'Connor
- "Breaking Glass", a 2005 episode of MythBusters
- Breaking Glass (Once Upon a Time), an episode of the TV series Once Upon a Time

=== Music ===
- "Breaking Glass" (song), a song by David Bowie
- Breaking Glass (album), a 1980 album by Hazel O'Connor
- "I Love the Sound of Breaking Glass", a 1978 single by Nick Lowe
- "Breaking Glass", a song by Baboon from their 2006 self-titled album

=== Other media ===
- Breaking Glass Press, an independent press run by the Alternative Media Project

== Rituals ==
- Breaking the glass, a Jewish wedding ritual
- Plate smashing in Greek celebrations, where glasses and plates are thrown to the ground

== See also ==
- Broken Glass (disambiguation)
- Shattered Glass (disambiguation)
- Safety glass, a group of materials designed to minimize risk of injury caused by breakage
- Glassing, use of broken glass as a weapon
