= Primary Colours (The Horrors album) =

2009 studio album by the Horrors

Studio album by the Horrors
- Released: 27 April 2009
- Recorded: 2008
- Genres: Shoegaze; post-punk revival; gothic rock; psychedelic rock; krautrock
- Length: 45:28
- Label: XL
- Producers: The Horrors; Geoff Barrow; Craig Silvey; Chris Cunningham

The Horrors chronology
Strange House (2007)	Primary Colours (2009)	Skying (2011)

Singles from Primary Colours
- 1. "Sea Within a Sea" Released: 17 March 2009; 2. "Who Can Say" Released: 11 May 2009; 3. "Mirror's Image" Released: 14 August 2009; 4. "Whole New Way" / "Primary Colours" Released: 4 October 2009

Primary Colours is the second studio album by English rock band the Horrors. It was first released as a livestream on the NME website on 27 April 2009, and received a wide release a week later.

== Background ==
The album was produced by Geoff Barrow of Portishead, Craig Silvey and music video director Chris Cunningham. Recording took place in Bath during the summer of 2008. The band signed with XL Recordings after leaving Loog Records in 2007. Regarding their time in the studio, band member Rhys Webb commented: "We had such an amazing time working on it, writing it and getting lost in it... we'd wander into the studio, and then never want to leave". Webb and Tom Cowan, who had joined the band as keyboardist and bass guitarist respectively, switched instruments from this album onwards.

Prior to the album's release, the band released a cover of Suicide's "Shadazz" on a split single released by Blast First Petite as part of their tribute to Alan Vega in October 2008. On 17 March 2009, the eight-minute music video for "Sea Within a Sea", directed by former Jesus and Mary Chain bassist Douglas Hart, was posted on the band's website. The song was released as a digital download-only single, and full details of Primary Colours also surfaced.

In a preview article, music journalist Mike Diver commented that the album was "set to be one of the year's best" and that it was "wholly worth all the hype that's attracted to its unexpected brilliance."

== Release ==
Primary Colours was released by XL on 4 May 2009, with a livestream on the NME website a week prior. The album charted on the UK Albums Chart at No. 25.

Following the album's release, the single "Who Can Say" was released on 7" vinyl.

In 2009, it was awarded a silver certification from the Independent Music Companies Association, which indicated sales of at least 30,000 copies throughout Europe.

== Reception ==
Professional ratings
Aggregate scores
Source	Rating
AnyDecentMusic?	7.6/10
Metacritic	82/100
Review scores
Source	Rating
AllMusic	4/5 stars
The A.V. Club	B+
The Daily Telegraph	4/5 stars
The Guardian	4/5 stars
Mojo	4/5 stars
NME	9/10
Pitchfork	7.6/10
Q	4/5 stars
Rolling Stone	3.5/5 stars
Spin	6/10

According to the review aggregator website Metacritic, the record was met with "universal critical acclaim", receiving a normalised score of 82% based on 19 reviews.

On 21 July 2009, the album was announced as one of the twelve albums shortlisted for the year's Mercury Prize award, but it ultimately lost to Speech Debelle's album, Speech Therapy.

Fact said that the album struck "a rich vein of brawny but windswept psychedelic rock." BBC Music positively compared the album to the work of My Bloody Valentine, Loop and Deutsch Amerikanische Freundschaft.

Pitchfork emphasized the band's change in style, noting their "shoegazer makeover" and concluding that the album succeeded in "transforming gothic gloom into psychedelic drone".

Retrospectively calling the album "the triple point where goth, post-punk, and shoegaze met", AllMusic concluded: "As bold and listenable as it is, Primary Colours is occasionally scattered, giving the impression that the band is trying on different sounds for size—although the fact that most of it works so well is actually more surprising than how different it is from their earlier work".

== Accolades ==
Publication	Country	Accolade	Year	Rank
Drowned in Sound	UK	Top 50 Albums of 2009	2009	#13
The Fly	UK	Best Albums of 2009	2009	#5
Mojo	UK	Top Albums of 2009	2009	#4
NME	UK	Top albums of 2009	2009	#1
Planet Sound	UK	Top albums of 2009	2009	#3
Q	UK	Top albums of 2009	2009	#39
The Quietus	UK	Top albums of 2009	2009	#2
Clash	UK	Top albums of 2009	2009	#7
NME	UK	500 Greatest Albums of All Time	2013	#218
NME	UK	Best Albums of the 00s	2009	#68
The Times	UK	Top 100 Albums of the 2000s	2009	#81
Beats Per Minute	USA	The 130 Best Albums of the Last Five Years	2013	#72
Clash	UK	The Top 100 Albums of Clash's Lifetime	2014	#36
The Quietus	UK	The Top 100 Albums of the Quietus' Existence	2018	#99

== Legacy ==
To celebrate the tenth anniversary of the album's release, the Horrors played the album in full at a one-off show at The Royal Albert Hall on 9 May 2019.

In a retrospective 2019 article about the album, Loud and Quiet argued "this exploratory, psychedelic record... would act as an antiseptic to the post-Libertines landfill still dominant in 2009. Its role in ushering in a British psych revival has been under acknowledged, too."

== Track listing ==
All songs written and arranged by the Horrors.

1. "Mirror's Image" – 4:50
2. "Three Decades" – 2:50
3. "Who Can Say" – 3:41
4. "Do You Remember" – 3:28
5. "New Ice Age" – 4:25
6. "Scarlet Fields" – 4:43
7. "I Only Think of You" – 7:07
8. "I Can't Control Myself" – 3:28
9. "Primary Colours" – 3:02
10. "Sea Within a Sea" – 8:00

Japan-only bonus tracks:

1. "You Could Never Tell" – 3:30
2. "Whole New Way" – 4:58
3. "Sea Within a Sea" (enhanced video) – 8:24

== Personnel ==
- The Horrors – production, mixing, engineering
- Craig Silvey – production, mixing, engineering
- Geoff Barrow – production, mixing, engineering
- Chris Cunningham – production on tracks 2 and 9
- Ciaran O'Shea – sleeve artwork

== Charts ==
Chart	Provider(s)	Peak position
Belgium Walloon Albums Chart	IFPI	40
France Physical Albums Chart	SNEP	141
UK Albums Chart	BPI	25
