= Jack the Ripper (song) =

Single by Screaming Lord Sutch
- B-side: "Don't You Just Know It" (UK); "I'm a Hog for You" (Germany)
- Released: March 1963
- Recorded: Holloway Road; Islington, England
- Genre: Garage rock; shock rock
- Length: 2:57
- Label: Decca; F 11598 (UK 7"); DL 25202 (Germany 7")
- Songwriters: Clarence and Charles Stacy (Stacey); Walter Haggin (Hagen); Joe Simmons (Symonds)
- Producer: Joe Meek

Screaming Lord Sutch singles chronology
"Good Golly Miss Molly" (1961)	"Jack the Ripper" (1963)	"She's Fallen in Love with a Monster" (1963)

"Jack the Ripper" is a song written by Clarence Stacy, his brother Charles Stacy, Walter Haggin and Joe Simmons, and first recorded by Clarence Stacy in 1961. His recording, arranged by Lor Crane, was issued that year as a single on the Carol record label in New York City.

The most famous recording was by the English musician Screaming Lord Sutch, released as a 7" single in the UK and Germany in 1963 on Decca. It was credited as written by "Stacey, Hagen, Symonds", produced by Joe Meek and recorded in his Holloway Road studio in Islington, England. The song was banned by the BBC upon its release.

== Musical composition ==
Sutch's version of "Jack the Ripper" is two minutes and forty-eight seconds long, in the key of B-flat major, and 4/4 time. It begins with the sound of footsteps and a woman screaming, followed by a rendition of the "Danger Ahead" motif by the guitar and drum kit, accompanied by a ghoulish moan from Screaming Lord Sutch. The song itself is a three-chord song, with a vamp played by guitar and bass, with accompaniment by piano and drum kit, which is repeated throughout. The song is also punctuated with a brief insistent tone played on a Theremin. The song bears some similarity to a previous American novelty record, "Alley Oop", from 1960.

== Personnel ==
- Screaming Lord Sutch – singer
- Roger Mingay – electric guitar
- Ken Payne – bass guitar
- Andy Wren – piano
- Pete Newman – saxophone
- Carlo Little – drum kit
- Joe Meek – producer

== Cover versions ==
- In 1965, Casey Jones and the Governors released a version
- In 1986, Canadian garage punk band The Gruesomes covered the song and released it on the Jack the Ripper EP.
- In 2004, Detroit garage rock duo The White Stripes performed a cover of "Jack the Ripper" live as part of the Under Blackpool Lights release, incorporating the guitar riff from the "Peter Gunn" theme by Henry Mancini.
- In 2006, English garage rock band The Horrors covered the song for the B-side of their debut single, "Sheena Is a Parasite", later included on their 2006 debut EP, The Horrors EP. A rerecorded version was later included on their 2007 debut album, Strange House.
- In 2008, The Fall covered the song on their Halloween show at Hackney Empire, as well as Black Lips.
- Others: The Fuzztones (1993), The Vice Principals (2000), Casey Jones and the Governors, "The Rezillos", The Phantoms, The One-Way Streets (1966), The Beguiled (1988).
