= Rachel Zeffira =

Canadian-born soprano, composer, and multi-instrumentalist

- Born: Rachel Anne Santesso
- Occupations: Vocalist, musician, singer-songwriter, conductor, choral arranger
- Instruments: Vocals, piano, keyboards, oboe, cor anglais, violin, viola, percussion
- Member of: Cat's Eyes

Rachel Zeffira (born Rachel Anne Santesso) is a Canadian soprano, composer and multi-instrumentalist, currently based in London, England. She is also one half of the duo Cat's Eyes, the other being Faris Badwan of the Horrors.

== Life and work ==
=== Early life ===
Zeffira studied voice and organ at the Conservatorio Di Musica F.E. Dall'Abaco di Verona and oboe at the University of Victoria in Canada. She is a Fellow of the Royal Society of Arts, and in 2001, founded the Capital Children's Choir, which she also directs. Several videos of the choir's covers of contemporary songs such as "Chances" and "Untrust Us" received media attention and went viral. Zeffira released several albums with the Capital Children's Choir, and in 2015, the choir performed on the soundtrack for the film Pan. As a soprano, she released two albums, The Songs of Louis Vierne (2005) and The Sacred Heart of Nino Rota (2007).

Zeffira taught briefly at a primary school in London, where she taught a young Lily Allen, who has credited Zeffira as a mentor.

=== Cat's Eyes ===
While Zeffira was working as an opera singer and classical musician, she met Badwan. The two friends began to write songs together and formed the band Cat's Eyes. The duo made their first public appearance at the Vatican, where they performed one of their songs as a mass setting, with church organ and choir during a service at St. Peter's Basilica. Cat's Eyes were signed by Polydor in 2010 and released their eponymous debut album in April 2011. The album received positive press and critical acclaim. During this time, Zeffira appeared in Vogue magazine, and was shot by the photographer Rankin for the cover of Dazed & Confused alongside Bobby Gillespie of Primal Scream.

=== Solo work ===
Zeffira's first solo album, The Deserters, was released 10 December 2012 on RAF Records in Europe and Paper Bag Records in North America. The title track was chosen for the trailer to the final season of the TV program Skins. Zeffira received positive press for the debut and the album was listed in The Times Top 5 albums of 2012 in spite of its late release date.

Zeffira also received critical praise for her live performances. In June 2013. she was the opening act for Glastonbury Festival 2013.

In April 2013, Zeffira made her American radio debut on NPR's All Things Considered, and later made her Canadian radio debut with a live session on CBC Radio One show Q with Jian Ghomeshi

=== Film score compositions ===
Zeffira is listed as composer, arranger, orchestrator, conductor, musician and soprano on the Cat's Eyes soundtrack (released in February 2015) for the 2014 film The Duke of Burgundy, directed by Peter Strickland. The score received positive press and majority 5-star reviews. On 7 November 2015, it was announced that Zeffira and Badwan had won the European Film Award for Best Composer.

== Discography ==
=== As conductor and choral arranger ===
Year	Album	Label	Notes
2005	The Songs of Louis Vierne	Deux-Elles	Rachel Santesso, soprano; Roger Vignoles, piano; Hugh Webb, harp
2007	The Sacred Heart of Nino Rota	Zitto Music	Rachel Santesso, soprano; Sara Mingardo, contralto; Christopher Lemmings, tenor; Hugh Webb, harp
2008	Sweet Child of Mine	Kudos Records	Capital Children's Choir, primary artist; Rachel Santesso, director; arranger
2009	Winter Magic	Decca	Hayley Westenra, primary artist; Rachel Santesso, conductor
2011	Rabbits on the Run	Razor & Tie	Vanessa Carlton, primary artist; Rachel Santesso, choir director
2015	Pan Original Motion Picture Soundtrack	Warner Bros	Rachel Santesso; choir master

=== Cat's Eyes ===
- Broken Glass EP (2011, Polydor)
- Cat's Eyes (2011, Polydor)
- The Duke of Burgundy (2015, RAF/Caroline International)
- Treasure House (2016, Kobalt Label Services)

=== Solo ===
- The Deserters (2012, RAF)

=== Singles ===
- "Here on In" (2012, RAF)
- "Break the Spell" (2012, RAF)

== Other sources ==
- Lanham, Tom. "The Horrors’ Faris Badwan sees new success with Cat’s Eyes". The San Francisco Examiner. 2 February 2011.
- NME interview ."Horrors' Faris Badwan launches new band at the Vatican". 24 January 2011.
