= V (The Horrors album) =

2017 studio album by the Horrors

Studio album by the Horrors
- Released: 22 September 2017
- Studio: The Church (London)
- Genres: Neo-psychedelia; shoegaze; post-punk; gothic rock
- Length: 54:30
- Labels: Wolf Tone; Caroline International
- Producers: Paul Epworth; the Horrors

The Horrors chronology
Luminous (2014)	V (2017)	Lout (2021)

Singles from V
- 1. "Machine" Released: 13 June 2017; 2. "Something to Remember Me By" Released: 8 August 2017; 3. "Weighed Down" Released: 11 September 2017; 4. "Press Enter to Exit" Released: 24 November 2017

V is the fifth studio album by the English rock band the Horrors, released on 22 September 2017 by Wolf Tone and Caroline International.

== Promotion ==
=== Singles ===
The first single from the album, "Machine", was released on 13 June 2017; it premiered on BBC 6 Music. The single sleeve as well as the album artwork were designed by Erik Ferguson.

=== Music videos ===
On 17 July 2017, the Horrors premiered the video for "Machine", directed by Jon Emmony, who described the video in a press release:

"'Machine' is based around the concept of computer simulation. The creatures, formed from sections cut and twisted from insects, crustaceans and bone are arranged in sculptural compositions inspired by artists such as Hieronymus Bosch; finding the surreal within mixed forms and scales. The movement for the creatures is powered through generated simulations – randomised numbers and splines are generated and the position of each creature along these splines are calculated; seemingly without reason but born from the choices of software. If left, taken away from an edit, the creatures would continue to exist and their movements would evolve. Simulated hair adapts to changing wind speeds and directions, again manipulated by randomised mathematics. For me this was an exciting way to create digital imagery as having an element of control removed and then decided by a computer seemed fitting with the track. Machines inside machines".

== Controversy ==
On 14 June 2017, the band was accused of plagiarising visual artist Jesse Kanda with the artwork for the "Machine" single. The artwork, designed by Ferguson, shared several similarities with the works of Kanda, who then accepted that he in turn drew from the work of others, such as Chris Cunningham. Kanda later defended the Horrors in a statement: "At first I felt a bit territorial... But when I started seeing some people accusing some of my work being just as similar to some of Chris Cunningham's work, my stance shifted... I absolutely love Chris Cunningham – if I hadn't discovered his art in my adolescence, I wouldn't have made some of my art the same way". Kanda noted that the similarities might be coincidental, saying, "[...]Sometimes we might step on each other's toes, but that's actually out of love and admiration, coincidence, or even unconscious echoing too".

== Critical reception ==
Professional ratings
Aggregate scores
Source	Rating
AnyDecentMusic?	7.9/10
Metacritic	87/100
Review scores
Source	Rating
AllMusic	4/5 stars
The A.V. Club	A
The Guardian	5/5 stars
The Independent	4/5 stars
Mojo	4/5 stars
NME	4/5 stars
The Observer	4/5 stars
Pitchfork	7.1/10
Q	4/5 stars
Uncut	8/10

V was met with critical acclaim by contemporary music critics upon its release. According to review aggregator website Metacritic, the album received a normalised score of 87 based on 19 reviews, indicating "universal acclaim".

The Guardian critic Alexis Petridis gave the album 5 out of 5 stars in his review, proclaiming that the album "performs the not inconsiderable feat of sounding commercial without losing any of the Horrors' essence or individuality. You might reasonably counter that the kind of British alt-rock that currently sells sticks close to a landfill indie blueprint, with none of the invention and imagination on display here. Equally, there's something really powerful and undeniable about V's songs that suggests it could provide the most unlikely twist in an unlikely story: the Horrors actually becoming as big as the overheated hype announced they would a decade ago. Whether that happens or not, it's a triumph".

In a 4-star review for AllMusic, Heather Phares focused on the variety of sounds within the album: "As the album spans "World Below"'s fusion of shoegaze and industrial, "Something to Remember Me By"'s bittersweet widescreen synth pop, the trip-hop-tinged "Ghost", and the Suede-like balladry of 'It's a Good Life', the variety of sounds the band explores feels particularly engaging, especially when compared to the way Skying and Luminous presented their music as an ethereal blur". Concluding his review for The Skinny, Lewis Wade said, "Overall, V feels like a consolidation of all of the strengths that the Horrors have built up over the last 10 years, tightly bundled and perfectly accessible without sacrificing any of their artistic integrity". Paul Carr's review for PopMatters was similarly positive, claiming, "On V, the Horrors have got their mojo back. They sound lean, keen and mean but with songs to match the swagger. This is the album the band needed to make".

Stephen Dalton's review for Classic Rock was more reserved in its appraisal, stating that "Faris Badwan's polished croon lends a classy air to proceedings, though some of these studio-sculpted anthems clearly owe more to production wizardry and guitar-pedal pyrotechnics than solid songwriting".

== Track listing ==
No.	Title	Length
1.	"Hologram"	6:04
2.	"Press Enter to Exit"	5:55
3.	"Machine"	5:17
4.	"Ghost"	5:36
5.	"Point of No Reply"	5:00
6.	"Weighed Down"	6:30
7.	"Gathering"	5:16
8.	"World Below"	3:20
9.	"It's a Good Life"	4:52
10.	"Something to Remember Me By"	6:40

Japanese CD bonus tracks
No.	Title	Length
11.	"Fire Escape"	4:27
12.	"Water Drop"	3:16

== Personnel ==
The Horrors

- Faris Badwan – vocals
- Joshua Third – guitars
- Tom Furse – keyboards, synthesizers, drum programming
- Rhys Webb – bass, synthesizers, guitars
- Joe Spurgeon – drums, drum programming, synthesizers

Additional musicians

- Harry Edwards – cello

Production

- Paul Epworth – production
- Mandy Parnell – mastering
- Matt Wiggins – engineering, mixing
- Big Active – design
- Faris Badwan – design
- Erik Ferguson – digital imaging
- Riley Macintyre – assistance
- Luke Pickering – assistance

== Charts ==
Chart (2017)	Peak position
Belgian Albums (Ultratop Flanders)	121
Belgian Albums (Ultratop Wallonia)	138
French Albums (SNEP)	176
Irish Albums (IRMA)	86
New Zealand Heatseekers Albums (RMNZ)	10
Scottish Albums (Official Charts)	14
Spanish Albums (PROMUSICAE)	63
UK Albums (Official Charts)	8
