= Again into Eyes =

Studio album by S.C.U.M
- Released: 11 September 2011
- Recorded: 2011
- Genre: Art rock Post punk revival Shoegaze
- Length: 37:13
- Label: Mute
- Producer: Ken and Jolyon Thomas

Singles from Again into Eyes
- 1. "Amber Hands" Released: 18 July 2011; 2. "Whitechapel" Released: 26 September 2011; 3. "Faith Unfolds" Released: 2 January 2012

Again into Eyes is the debut album by Southeast London-based art rock band S.C.U.M, released on 11 September 2011 by Mute.

The album was produced by Ken and Jolyon Thomas, whose notable production credits (individually and together) include David Bowie, Public Image Ltd, Sigur Rós and Psychic TV.

The name Again into Eyes is taken from a lyric from the final track on the album; Whitechapel. The song Paris is a rerecording of a track originally featured on the band's SIGNALS project.

Again into Eyes marked a more commercial sound than had previously been heard on pieces such as the SIGNALS project and featured more audible lyrical passages and vocal melodies than any previous release by the band. The album received generally positive reviews, with a 7.3 rating from aggregating website AnyDecentMusic? (based on 9 professional reviews).

== Track listing ==
No.	Title	Length
1.	"Faith Unfolds"	3:45
2.	"Days Untrue"	3:34
3.	"Cast into Seasons"	3:50
4.	"Amber Hands"	3:51
5.	"Summon the Sound"	3:24
6.	"Sentinal Bloom"	4:58
7.	"Requiem"	3:00
8.	"Paris"	4:02
9.	"Water"	0:50
10.	"Whitechapel"	6:01
Total length:		37:13
