= Cat's Eyes =

Alternative pop band

cat's eye
- Origin: England and Canada
- Genres: Alternative pop; experimental rock
- Years active: 2011–present
- Labels: Polydor; RAF; Caroline International
- Spinoff of: The Horrors
- Members: Faris Badwan; Rachel Zeffira
- Website: catseyes.tv

Cat's Eyes are an alternative pop duo formed in early 2011 by vocalist Faris Badwan (known for his work with English indie rock band the Horrors) and Italian-Canadian soprano, composer, and multi-instrumentalist Rachel Zeffira.

== History ==
The band formed after Badwan introduced Zeffira to 1960s girl group music. Zeffira became intrigued by the likes of the Ronettes and acts produced by Joe Meek and Phil Spector, and soon began work on a demo version of a track (which eventually became "The Lull") in a similar style, which she sent to Badwan upon completion.

Using Zeffira's classical music contacts, the band were able to perform a short performance using a church organ and choir at the Vatican, in front of several important cardinals. Following positive press on the performance, they offered free downloads of two songs via their website, "Not a Friend" and a cover/remix of Grinderman's "When My Baby Comes".

On 28 February 2011, the duo released the Broken Glass EP on the Polydor label. It was recorded at Peter Gabriel's RealWorld Studios with record producer Steve Osborne. The Broken Glass EP featured three original compositions and a cover of a previously unreleased demo song by the Horrors, "Sunshine Girls". It met with positive press and was followed by the release of full-length album Cat's Eyes on 11 April 2011. Also recorded at RealWorld Studios, Cat's Eyes received positive reviews, with a 4-star review from The Guardian and a score of 7.9 from Pitchfork, and yielded two singles, "Face in the Crowd" (on 2 May 2011) and "Over You" (on 25 July 2011).

The duo recorded the soundtrack (released in February 2015) for Peter Strickland's 2014 film The Duke of Burgundy, for which they won the European Film Award for Best Composer.

Preceded by the singles "Chameleon Queen" and "Drag", both issued in February 2016, the band's second album, Treasure House, was released on 3 June 2016 on the Kobalt Label Services record label.

In March 2016, they unofficially performed "We'll Be Waiting" at a private evening event at the Queen's Gallery, part of Buckingham Palace, under the pretence of being a Renaissance music ensemble.

== Discography ==
=== Studio albums ===
- Cat's Eyes (2011, Polydor)
- Treasure House (2016, Kobalt Label Services)

=== Soundtracks ===
- The Duke of Burgundy (soundtrack) (2015, RAF/Caroline International)

=== Singles and EPs ===
- Broken Glass EP (2011, Polydor)
- "Face in the Crowd" (2011, Polydor)
- "Over You" (2011, Polydor)
- "The Duke of Burgundy" (2015, Raf Records)
- "Names on the Mountains" (2016, Raf Records)
- "Chameleon Queen" (2016, Kobalt Label Services)
- "Drag" (2016, Kobalt Label Services)
- "Be Careful Where You Park Your Car" (2016, Raf Records)
