= Bloom Forever =

Studio album by Thomas Cohen
- Released: 6 May 2016
- Genre: Indie rock
- Label: Stolen Recordings

Bloom Forever is the debut album by Thomas Cohen, recorded for Stolen Recordings, released on 6 May 2016.

== Critical reception ==
The album received generally positive reviews from music critics.

Professional ratings
Aggregate scores
Source	Rating
Metacritic	67/100
Review scores
Source	Rating
NME	4/5
