= Capital Children's Choir =

The Capital Children's Choir is a children's choir based in London, England. The choir was founded in 2001 by Artistic Director Rachel Santesso and is currently made up of 120 members aged seven to eighteen. As well as performing classical repertoire, the choir is well known for its choral and orchestral reinterpretations of famous pop songs and since September 2008 their videos have received well over 6.1 million views to date within the popular video-sharing site YouTube.

== History and founder ==
The Capital Children’s Choir was founded in 2001 when four 10-year-old girls contacted Rachel Santesso and asked her to start a singing club in London. By the end of the year the singing club had grown into a small choir and she took the group to record an album at a local recording studio. Since then, the choir has grown to 120 members and now records each year at Abbey Road Studio. The Capital Children’s Choir also performs regularly at venues in London and abroad. Santesso, a classical soprano, studied voice and organ at the Conservatorio Di Musica F.E. Dall'Abaco di Verona and oboe at the University of Victoria in Canada and has recorded albums of songs by Louis Vierne and Nino Rota. She taught briefly at a primary school in London where she discovered and encouraged the young Lily Allen to become a singer.

== Performances ==
The choir's performances include:

2006

- Members of the choir perform in the presence of Pope Benedict at St. Peter’s Basilica during morning Mass on the first anniversary of Pope John Paul II’s death. (April 2, 2006)
- The choristers are featured performers at the Royal Albert Hall for the launch of the anti-cervical cancer vaccine, Gardasil (October 17, 2012)

2007

- Members of the choir sing with Malcolm Middleton for Colin Murray's BBC Radio 1 live session (Dec 7 2007)
- The choir sings with the Spice Girls at 18 shows during their reunion tour at the O2 Arena, London.

2008

- Members of the choir perform at Reading Festival alongside American punk rock band, Anti-Flag (August 22, 2008)
- First youtube Recording at Abbey Road Studios, performing “Sweet Child O’Mine” by Guns N' Roses with orchestra.

2009

- The choir records a cover of “Chinese” by Lily Allen and uploads it on YouTube. The video is featured on Perez Hilton’s popular website and receives much positive press
- International Rugby Matches at Twickenham Stadium. Members of the choir perform the national anthem and Jerusalem at Twickenham Stadium for the England vs Australia match (November 7, 2009)
- Members of the choir perform at the International Rugby England vs Argentina match at Twickenham Stadium (November 14, 2009)
- The choir is invited to appear alongside actress Lily Cole for the annual lighting of the Christmas Tree at Somerset House, London (November 16, 2009)
- The choir is invited to perform a recital at St. Paul’s Cathedral in aid of KIDS charity (November 18, 2009)

2010

- FA Cup Final - members of the choir sing alongside teen mezzo-soprano Faryl Smith at Wembley Stadium (May 15, 2010)
- International Rugby match at Twickenham Stadium - Members of the choir sing the national anthems of England and Samoa and “Jerusalem” at the England vs Samoa match. (November 20, 2010)
- Members of the choir are invited by Perez Hilton to perform at his show “One night in London” at the O2 Arena
- Members of the choir record with Vanessa Carlton at Abbey Road studios for her album “Rabbits on the Run”

2011

- International Rugby match at Twickenham Stadium - Members of the choir sing both national anthems and “Jerusalem” at the England vs France match (February 26, 2011)
- Members of the choir record a cover of Lady Gaga’s song “Judas” by request of Perez Hilton
- Members of the choir perform alongside Vanessa Carlton on the Conan Show in Hollywood

2012

- The choir records a cover of Florence and the Machine “Shake It Out” at Abbey Road Studios, after singing with Florence Welch during her rehearsal at Alexandra Palace, London
- The choir performs at the Bomber Command Memorial at Hyde Park, in the presence of Queen Elizabeth II and Charles, Prince of Wales.
- The choir is invited to perform at the Team USA gala ahead of the London 2012 Olympics and meet sporting legends Muhammad Ali and Carl Lewis

== In the Media ==
The Capital Children’s Choir has received a significant amount of attention in the press during recent years having gained support from several high-profile artists in the music industry, notably Lady Gaga who has described the choir as “flawless and otherworldly” They have also been featured several times on American blogger Perez Hilton’s website. Other artists who have publicly supported the choir have included Lily Allen, Vanessa Carlton, The Spice Girls and Florence and the Machine. The choir has also received positive press outside of the entertainment industry. The Sunday Times sports journalist and former rugby player Stephen Jones wrote of the choir “The Best Team of the autumn? The Capital Children’s Choir, who sang at Twickenham before the Samoa game. They were delightful and their version of the Samoan anthem was courageous and warming. They brought dignity to the pre-match build-up while across the rest of Europe, ranting reigned. For a few blessed minutes, the atmosphere was allowed to grow on its own. Their invitation should become permanent.” (Sunday Times, November 28, 2010, page 4 Sports section)
