= Shattered Mirror (disambiguation) =

Shattered Mirror is a novel by Amelia Atwater-Rhodes.

Shattered Mirror may also refer to:

- Shattered Mirror (Star Trek: Deep Space Nine), a fourth-season episode
- Shattered Mirror, a Nollywood film with Ngozi Ezeonu
- "Shattered Mirror", a 1993 Mills & Boon novel by Kate Walker (writer)
- Badger: Shattered Mirror, a miniseries featuring Badger (comics)

== See also ==
- Shattered Glass (disambiguation)
