= The Open (band) =

English indie rock band

- Origin: Liverpool, England
- Genres: indie rock
- Years active: 2003–2006
- Labels: Loog Records; Polydor
- Past members: Steve Bayley; Jon Winter; Roger Westwood; Jim Reynolds; Alan Dutton; Scott Holland
- Website: www.theopenmusic.com

The Open were an English five-piece indie rock band who were signed to Loog Records. Their sound was heavily influenced by Talk Talk (particularly their Spirit of Eden album), Cocteau Twins, and early U2, as well as latterly incorporating jazz, such as Miles Davis and Tommy-era The Who. Their debut album The Silent Hours was released in July 2004 to positive reviews.

In February 2006 they released their second album Statues. First single, ‘We Can Never Say Goodbye’ was a minor hit before splitting up in May of the same year. A statement from the band regarding the split reads as follows:

"I believe you are waiting for the official word. So here it is. The news is that we have indeed decided to call the [sic] it a day with The Open. We leave the two records that we are very very proud of and memories that will remain in our hearts forever. Some of us will continue on our path through music. Some of us will not. We all wish each other the greatest of luck. No excuses, no regrets, no big philosophical kiss off, it's just the end of one journey and the start of another. Bless you all for your support over these last years and goodbye. Steve, Jon, Jim, Alan, and Roger."

== Members ==
- Steven Bayley — vocals, guitar
- Jon Winter — guitar
- Jim Reynolds — bass
- Alan Dutton — keyboards
- Roger Westwood — drums, percussion
- Scott Holland — drums, percussion (2002–2004)

== Discography ==
=== Albums ===
- The Silent Hours (5 July 2004) UK No. 72
  - Polydor/Loog 986 616-0 (CD/LP)
  1. "Close My Eyes"
  2. "Bring Me Down"
  3. "Lost"
  4. "Forgotten"
  5. "Daybreak"
  6. "Just Want to Live"
  7. "Step Into the Light"
  8. "Coming Down"
  9. "Can You Hear"
  10. "Elevation"
- Statues (6 February 2006) UK No.135
  - Polydor/Loog 987 549-9 (CD/LP)
  1. "Forever"
  2. "We Can Never Say Goodbye"
  3. "Moment in Time"
  4. "Lovers in the Rain"
  5. "Statues"
  6. "My House"
  7. "She's Mystery"
  8. "Seasons of the Change"
  9. "Fallen Tree"
  10. "Alone" / "Masquerade" (hidden track)

=== EPs ===
- La Lumiere E.P. (13 March 2006)
  - Polydor/Loog 987 672-3 (CD/12")
  1. "We Can Never Say Goodbye"
  2. "The Box"
  3. "I Call You"
  4. "The Mirror"
  5. "We Can Never Say Goodbye" (enhanced video)

=== Singles ===
Song	Release date	Release info	Formats	UK Singles Chart	Album
"Never Enough"	17 November 2003	Polydor (981 307-5)	CD, 12" vinyl	95	Non-album single
"Close My Eyes"	1 March 2004	Polydor (981 729-4)	CD, 7", 12"	46	The Silent Hours
"Just Want to Live"	21 June 2004	Polydor (986 648-9)	CD, 7", 12"	52	The Silent Hours
"Elevation"	30 August 2004	Polydor (986 749-5)	CD, 7"	54	The Silent Hours
"Never Enough" (re-issue)	1 November 2004	Polydor (986 877-9)	CD, 7", DVD	53	Non-album single
"—" denotes a release that did not chart.
