= Sheena Is a Parasite =

Single by the Horrors

from the album Strange House
- B-side: "Jack the Ripper"
- Released: 10 April 2006
- Genre: Garage punk
- Length: 1:40
- Label: Loog
- Songwriter(s): Faris Badwan, Tom Cowan, Joshua Hayward, Joseph Spurgeon, Rhys Webb

The Horrors singles chronology
"Sheena Is a Parasite" (2006)	"Count in Fives" (2006)

"Sheena Is a Parasite" is the debut single by English rock band the Horrors, released in April 2006 by Loog Records.

== Content ==
The title and content are adapted from the Ramones single "Sheena Is a Punk Rocker" as well as the Cramps' "Sheena's in a Goth Gang", and the song chronicles the demise of punk music and its cultural influence.

The B-side is a cover of the Screaming Lord Sutch song "Jack the Ripper".

== Music video ==
The Chris Cunningham-directed video starred Academy Award nominee Samantha Morton as the song's manic, transmogrifying subject who whipped around like a banshee and spewed her intestines at the camera. Sharply edited and shot on a low budget, the video was instantly banned from MTV UK purely on the basis of the use of strobe lights, not because of the gory subject matter (as was erroneously reported by NME). The video did air on MTV2 in America, as a part of their Subterranean program.

Billboard included the video at No. 14 in its list of "The 15 Scariest Music Videos Ever".

== Legacy ==
In October 2011, NME placed "Sheena Is a Parasite" at No. 96 on its list "150 Best Tracks of the Past 15 Years".

== Track listing ==
1. "Sheena Is a Parasite"
2. "Jack the Ripper"
