= Higher (The Horrors album) =

Remix album by The Horrors
- Released: Digital: 4 December 2012; Physical: March, 2013
- Genre: Indie rock, psychedelic rock, alternative rock
- Length: 90:22
- Label: XL

The Horrors chronology
Skying (2011)	Higher (2012)	Luminous (2014)

Higher is a remix album by the Horrors, released in 2012 by XL Recordings.

According to keyboardist Tom Furse, the band were driving across California when they had the idea that they should release a box set of singles taken from the album Skying. According to Furse, they got drawn in to other artists that "excited" the band: "However, through chance encounters and wanting to involve more people whose music excited us, the box soon grew into an impressive collection of sonic tapestries and hypnotic grooves and it became apparent that this was no longer about the singles. It was now about this new music which had used the different elements of Skying as a springboard to other ideas. We encouraged everyone involved to be as obtuse as possible, to get as far away from the original source material as they could. The results are stunning, and I think it's just a shame we couldn't have done more." It was released two days after NME announced the album's existence.

== Physical release ==
The physical release was issued in March 2013, consisting of four 12" vinyl records, two CDs and a DVD. The four records consisted of the same album found on the digital release except with a different track list. The two CDs also contained the same album but with the same track listing (though the album was split into two six-track CDs). The DVD contained all three music videos from Skying: "Still Life" (directed by Oliver Murray), "I Can See Through You" (directed by White Rabbit) and "Changing the Rain" (directed by Pete Fowler).

== Track listing ==
All tracks are written by The Horrors.

No.	Title	Length
1.	"I Can See Through You (Blanck Mass Remix)"	11:08
2.	"Monica Gems (Daniel Avery Remix)"	5:58
3.	"Still Life (Connan Mockasin Remix)"	4:06
4.	"You Said (Peaking Lights Dub U Mix)"	4:13
5.	"Still Life (Still Living Still Giving Cherrystones Remix)"	6:38
6.	"Moving Further Away (Andrew Weatherall Remix)"	8:26
7.	"Come in Waves (Seahawks Skying Suite)"	12:48
8.	"Moving Further Away (Andy Blake World Unknown Remix)"	11:27
9.	"Dive In (The Pressure Ridges Remix)"	5:09
10.	"You Said (JTC Remix)"	6:49
11.	"Wild Eyed (Andrew Weatherall Remix)"	7:14
12.	"Moving Into Blue (Seahawks Skying Suite)"	6:26
Total length:		90:22
