= Shattered Glass =

Shattered Glass may refer to:

- Shattered Glass (film), a 2003 biographical drama film
- "Shattered Glass" (song), a 1980 song originally performed by Ellie Warren, notably recorded in 1987 by Laura Branigan
- "Shattered Glass", a 2008 song by Britney Spears from Circus
- Transformers: Shattered Glass, a Transformers continuity where the Autobots are evil and the Decepticons are good

== See also ==
- Shattered Mirror (disambiguation)
- Broken Glass (disambiguation)
