= Ali Saeed Badwan =

Palestinian writer (1959–2025)

- علي سعيد بدوان
- Born: 1959; Yarmouk Camp, near Damascus, Syria
- Died: 1 June 2025 (aged 65)
- Occupations: Writer, political analyst

Ali Saeed Badwan (Arabic: علي سعيد بدوان; 1959 – 1 June 2025) was a Palestinian writer and political analyst based in Syria, born in Yarmouk camp near Damascus in 1959. His family left Haifa to take refuge in Syria following the 1948 Palestine Nakba.

== Background ==
Badwan attended UNRWA institutions in Yarmouk camp, including Sarfand School, Al-Malikya Primary School, and Yarmouk High School, where he acquired his early education.

In 1982, he graduated from Damascus University's Faculty of Science with a bachelor's degree in basic sciences (physics and chemistry), a diploma in education from Damascus University's Faculty of Education in 1987, and a degree in military sciences from Damascus University's Faculty of Education in 1988. As well as a degree in military studies from the Syrian Army's Military Infantry College while serving in the Palestine Liberation Army.

From 1983 onwards, he worked as a physics and chemistry teacher in Damascus high schools and at a Teacher Training Institute, and from 2002 to 2017, he was a physics and chemistry specialist and the chairman of the Damascus Education Coordination Team.

Badwan died on 1 June 2025, at the age of 65.

== Political activity ==
Badwan joined the Palestinian political action and the Democratic Front for the Liberation of Palestine (DFLP) in 1974, took up various leadership positions in the Democratic Front and the Palestine Liberation Organization, and was one of the guerrillas who confronted the Israeli forces that invaded Lebanon and besieged Beirut in 1982. In the summer of 1985, he was injured in the War of the Camps battle and was arrested by an Arab force in Lebanon. He left the Democratic Front in 2003. He was the director of the PLO's Information Office in Damascus.

== Works ==
- Jerusalem, refugees and unbalanced negotiations Dar Al Ahali Damascus – 1997 – Case Study.
- The Palestinian left – Dar Al Ahali – Damascus – 1998 – Case Study.
- Palestinian refugees in Syria and Iraq from uprooting to returning – Dar.
- Al Maizan – Damascus – 2000 – Case Study.
