= Luminous (The Horrors album) =

2014 studio album by the Horrors

Studio album by the Horrors
- Released: 5 May 2014
- Genre: Neo-psychedelia; shoegaze; dream pop; synth-pop; experimental pop
- Length: 51:34
- Label: XL
- Producer: The Horrors

The Horrors chronology
Higher (2012)	Luminous (2014)	V (2017)

Singles from Luminous
- 1. "So Now You Know" Released: 5 May 2014; 2. "I See You" Released: 12 August 2014

Luminous is the fourth studio album by English rock band the Horrors, released on 5 May 2014 by XL Recordings. The album's style has been described as neo-psychedelia, shoegaze and dream pop. In 2014 it was awarded a silver certification from the Independent Music Companies Association, which indicated sales of at least 20,000 copies throughout Europe.

== Critical reception ==
Professional ratings
Aggregate scores
Source	Rating
Metacritic	74/100
Review scores
Source	Rating
AllMusic	4/5 stars
Alternative Press	4/5 stars
Consequence of Sound	B
NME	8/10 stars
Pitchfork	6.7/10

At Alternative Press, Annie Zaleski rated the album 4 stars, remarking how "Luminous certainly wears its influences proudly; however, the record boasts undeniable energy and urgency". Pitchfork's Ian Cohen said, "They have[…]mastered their sound and vision, and hopefully they can grow to recognize their heart and soul, too", while Heather Phares of AllMusic stated that "Luminous proves the Horrors still have a sense of adventure; they sound comfortable, but not too comfortable to try new things". Consequence of Sound reviewer Kristofer Lenz also praised the album, saying, "Across the board, Luminous represents a solid step forward for the Horrors. With this newly expanded sound and epic scope, they’ve moved beyond their early garage rock and goth influences and are now in conversation with Brit rockers like Muse or Radiohead. While they are still a long way from taking the crown from either of those two, Luminous is a shot across the bow, letting the world know the punks have grown up".

== Track listing ==
All songs written and arranged by the Horrors except where noted.

No.	Title	Writer(s)	Length
1.	"Chasing Shadows"		6:49
2.	"First Day of Spring"		5:11
3.	"So Now You Know"		5:02
4.	"In and Out of Sight"		5:03
5.	"Jealous Sun"		4:10
6.	"Falling Star"	The Horrors, Paul Epworth	3:43
7.	"I See You"		7:32
8.	"Change Your Mind"		5:07
9.	"Mine and Yours"		3:31
10.	"Sleepwalk"		5:26

Japanese CD bonus tracks
No.	Title	Length
11.	"Phono"	4:06
12.	"Nocturne"	3:13

== Personnel ==
- The Horrors – production, arrangements, art direction, design
- Marc Donaldson, Nic Shonfeld – art direction, design
- Eduardo de la Paz Canal – recording
- Craig Silvey – co-production, recording, mixing
- Greg Calbi, Ryan Smith – mastering
- Nic Shonfeld – photography
- Cathy Lucas – violin (tracks 5, 6 and 7)
- Frank Ricotti – marimba, vibraphone (track 6)
