= Douglas Hart =

British musician (born 1961)

- Born: 2 May 1965 (age 61); Glasgow, Scotland
- Genres: Alternative rock
- Occupations: Musician, director
- Instrument: Bass
- Years active: 1984–present
- Labels: Creation, Blanco Y Negro

Douglas Alexander Hart (born 2 May, 1965) is a Scottish musician and music video director.

== Career ==
Hart was the first bassist and founding member of the Scottish band The Jesus and Mary Chain, and played with the group from 1984 to 1991. He is noted for wearing black sunglasses and usually playing with fewer than four strings on his bass guitar.

In 1988, he branched out, releasing the solo acid house single "Speed Speed Ecstasy" using the name Acid Angels.

While in the band, Hart started to direct music videos for other acts. He founded his own video company and has directed over 80 music videos. The videos include many for Creation Records, such as My Bloody Valentine's "You Made Me Realise" and "Feed Me with Your Kiss", and he directed concert videos for The Stone Roses, including Live Blackpool. He directed "For Lovers" for Wolfman, featuring Pete Doherty; The Libertines' "Can't Stand Me Now"; three promos for Babyshambles, including "Killamangiro" and "Delivery"; videos for Primal Scream (including the Screamadelica video album); and videos for Paul Weller. He also worked as producer for Jesse Garon and The Desperadoes and Baby Lemonade from Glasgow on the Narodnik Records Label. Hart also directed the film Brazil 70, the Sexiest Kick Off for BBC Television.

In 2007, Hart took up the bass guitar again and played with Sian Alice Group, touring with Spiritualized.

In early 2009, Hart directed the music video for The Horrors' "Sea Within a Sea" as well as Pet Shop Boys' "Did You See Me Coming?".

Hart also wrote directed a semi-autobiographical short film titled Long Distance Information with Peter Mullan in a leading role. It was screened at the 2011 London Film Festival.

In 2016, along with Jeannette Lee, formerly of Public Image Ltd. and Steve Mackey, former bassist of Pulp, Hart began Call This Number, a guerrilla TV project making erratic film broadcasts from a North London garage.

In August 2018, Hart directed Miu Miu's Autumn/Winter 2018 campaign.

== Political views ==
In November 2019, along with 34 other musicians, Hart signed a letter endorsing the Labour Party leader Jeremy Corbyn in the 2019 UK general election with a call to end austerity.
