= Strange House =

2007 studio album by the Horrors

Studio album by the Horrors
- Released: 5 March 2007
- Recorded: 2006
- Genre: Garage punk; gothic rock; post-punk; garage rock
- Length: 38:08
- Label: Loog
- Producer: Alan Moulder; Rob Kirwan; Nick Zinner; Ben Hillier; Jim Sclavunos; Dimitri Tikovoi

The Horrors chronology
The Horrors (2006)	Strange House (2007)	Primary Colours (2009)

Professional ratings
Aggregate scores
Source	Rating
Metacritic	71/100
Review scores
Source	Rating
AllMusic	4/5 stars
BBC Collective	4/5 stars
Drowned in Sound	6/10
The Guardian	5/5 stars
Mojo	4/5 stars
NME	7/10
The Observer	4/5 stars
Rolling Stone	2.5/5 stars
Uncut	4/5 stars
Yahoo Music	9/10

Strange House is the debut studio album by English rock band the Horrors, released on 5 March 2007 by Loog Records.

== Content ==
The band announced the title via a Myspace bulletin on 11 January 2007. The album subtitle, "Psychotic Sounds for Freaks and Weirdos", was created by a fan from the official Horrors forum.

The album consists mostly of previously released material, although several of these tracks were re-recorded or remixed.

== Release ==
Strange House was released on 5 March 2007 by Loog Records. It reached No. 37 in the UK Albums Chart.

A special edition including a DVD in a gatefold digipak was also released, which contained three music videos ("Sheena Is a Parasite", "Count in Fives" and "Gloves"), three live performances (one full-length and two short sets), an interview and a photo gallery.

== Reception ==
A review in PopMatters said, "The Horrors bring a dose of dark glamour to an increasingly anodyne British alternative music scene... They blend their twin influences of early '80s gothic rock and '60s garage to startling effect. No doubt some will fail to see past the cartoonish fancy dress of cobweb strewn Edwardian undertakers, and write them off as a joke or novelty act. This would be a shame as there are half a dozen brilliant tunes on offer here".

== Track listing ==
1. "Jack the Ripper" – 3:00 (Screaming Lord Sutch cover)
2. "Count in Fives" – 3:13
3. "Draw Japan" – 3:23
4. "Gloves" – 3:46
5. "Excellent Choice" – 2:53
  - On the US edition, "Excellent Choice" is replaced by "Horrors Theme"
6. "Little Victories" – 2:40
7. "She Is the New Thing" – 3:21
8. "Sheena Is a Parasite" – 1:42
9. "Thunderclaps" – 3:06
10. "Gil Sleeping" – 4:51
11. "A Train Roars" – 3:54
  - On UK editions of the album, there are three minutes of silence in the pregap preceding "Death at the Chapel"
12. "Death at the Chapel" (UK bonus track) – 2:19

Special Edition bonus DVD

1. Videos
  - "Sheena Is a Parasite"
  - "Count in Fives"
  - "Gloves"
2. Live in London, 21 September 2006 (Underage Club at Coronet Theatre)
  - "Jack the Ripper"
  - "Count in Fives"
  - "Horrors Theme"
  - "Death at the Chapel"
  - "Gloves"
  - "Sheena Is a Parasite"
  - "A Knife in the Eye"
  - "Count in Fives" (Reprise)
3. Live in New York, 2 November 2006 (The Annex)
  - "Horrors Theme"
  - "Crawdaddy Simone"
4. Live in Tokyo, 20 December 2006 (The Astrohall)
  - "Count in Fives"
5. Bonus video material
  - Interview
  - Photo Gallery
6. Hidden Footage: Live from the Casa de Ultragrrrl
  - Untitled
