= Lout (EP) =

EP by The Horrors
- Released: 12 March 2021
- Length: 11:54
- Label: Wolf Tone

The Horrors chronology
V (2017)	Lout (2021)	Night Life (2025)

Professional ratings
Aggregate scores
Source	Rating
Metacritic	80/100
Review scores
Source	Rating
Beats Per Minute	78%
Clash	8/10
DIY	4.5/5 stars

Lout is an EP by English rock band The Horrors. It was released on 12 March 2021 by Wolf Tone Records.

== Release ==
On 23 February 2021, the Horrors announced they were releasing a new EP.

== Critical reception ==
Lout was met with "generally favorable reviews" from critics. At Metacritic, which assigns a weighted average rating out of 100 to reviews from mainstream publications, this release received an average score of 80 based on 6 reviews.

In a review for Beats Per Minute, John Amen wrote: "While Lout offers only a sampling of The Horrors' latest direction, it's one that will hopefully be further developed on a full-length release. Even though there are only three tracks here, and a total of approximately 12 minutes of music, Lout represents some of The Horrors' most expressive, uninhibited, and memorable work." Liam Egan at Clash wrote: "The Horrors have released their heaviest material to date on this unhinged EP. Badwan's vocals are nasty and coarse, with proceedings momentarily taking a slight diversion into the occult as ominous grouped vocals soar over the track - to then be crushed under the mass under Lout's instrumentation." Lisa Wright of DIY said "The Horrors are out, having made their boldest, most exciting switch-flip in years."

== Track listing ==
Lout track listing
No.	Title	Length
1.	"Lout"	3:05
2.	"Org"	3:57
3.	"Whiplash"	4:52
