= Loom (band) =

English rock band

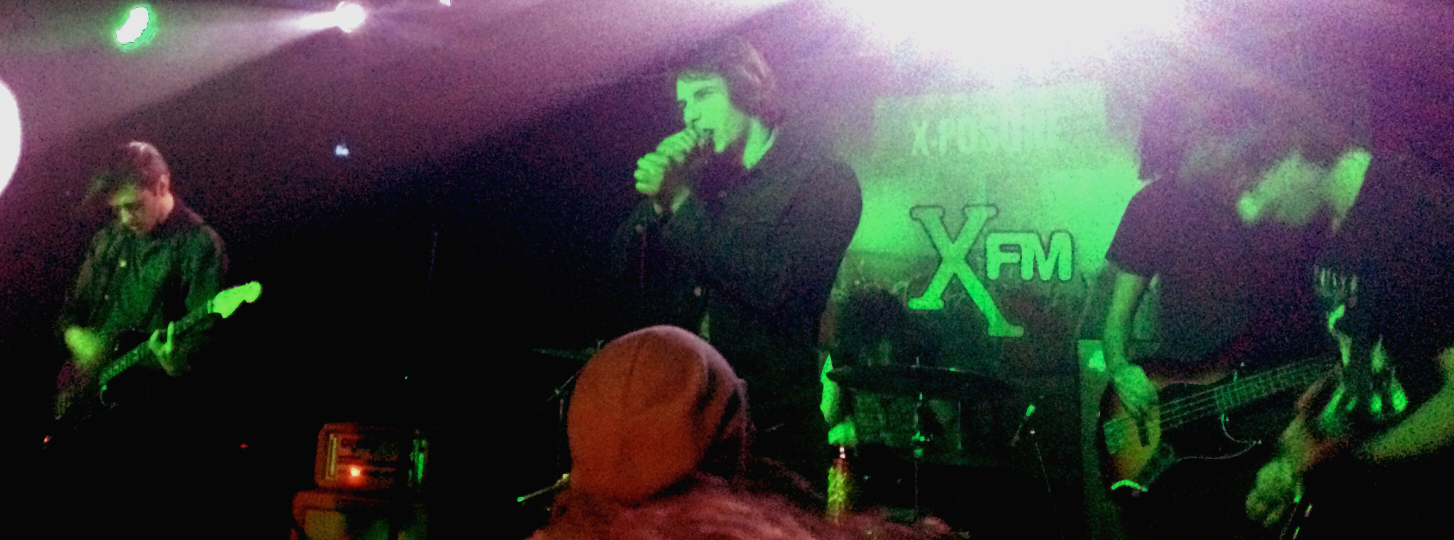
- LOOM performing at The Barfly, Camden, London, 15 June 2015.

Background information
- Origin: Leamington Spa, Warwickshire, England
- Genres: Rock, alternative rock, grunge
- Years active: 2012–present
- Members: Tarik Badwan; Joshua Fitzgerald; Matt Marsh; Jack Foster; Neil Ganesha
- Past members: Neil Byrne; Filip "Todd" Zieliński; Harry Badwan; Samuel Lister

Loom (often styled as LOOM) are an English rock band formed in Leamington Spa, Warwickshire in 2012 and based in London. The band consists of vocalist Tarik Badwan, lead guitarist Joshua Fitzgerald, rhythm guitarist Matt Marsh, bassist Jack Foster, and drummer Neil Ganesha.

Tarik Badwan has been called "the angriest man to stalk a stage in ages and the owner of the best death stare [sic: in] London." He is commonly noted as having a malevolent stage presence: staring, jumping into the crowd, and other confrontational mischief.

== History ==
Loom released their first single on 3 December 2012, a three-track cassette-only single through the label Heart/throb, including the tracks "Bleed on Me", "Lizard", and a cover of the Misfits' "She". The cassette sold out in hours.

On 25 March 2013 the band released a 7" single "I Get A Taste" with a B-side cover of the Zombies' "She's Not There". Later that year they released a limited edition cassette of only 200 copies containing five covers of songs that have influenced them, including Bad Brains, Warsaw / Joy Division, the Pixies, GG Allin, and the Jesus Lizard's "Seasick".

Their first digital EP Lice was released on 2 December 2013, which included a re-recording of the single "I Get A Taste" as well as their cover of "Seasick", plus three new songs "Acid King City", "Lice" and "Salt". "Acid King City" was promoted prior to the EP's release and received critical acclaim. The Line of Best Fit said it was the band's "best crack at mapping the crunchy, sleazy garage-rock genome thus far." Clash Music crowned the song 'Track of the Day' and called it "perhaps their most perfect moment yet."

On 5 May 2014 they released a 7" vinyl single called "Yosoko" with a B-side Wire cover of "Lowdown." Loom also released an accompanying music video for "Yosoko."

On 8 June 2015 Loom released a double-A side 7" vinyl single "Hate" with a re-release of "Bleed on Me" on the opposite side.

Loom's first full-length album was released on 19 May 2017. Singles from their self-titled debut were "Hate" (released 3 March 2017), "Lice" (released 31 March 2017), and "Nailbender" (released 8 May 2017). Critics praised the record as a "particularly strong debut" and felt that Loom had "really pushed themselves." Tarik Badwan's voice was also compared to that of Iggy Pop. The band supported this record by touring with Dead Kennedys and playing a number of shows around the United Kingdom.

Loom then took some time off, during which Joshua Fitzgerald and Matt Marsh formed a band called Persian Furs. On 8 May 2026, Loom returned with the single "Douglas". Their single "Milligrams" will be released in November 2026. Both were recorded with their newest members, Jack Foster (bass) and Neil Ganesha (drums), with Thomas Edward at RML Studios in Wolverhampton. Loom played the Open Arms Stage at the 2026 Tramlines festival. Loom also plays gigs in support of Projects in Palestine. Singer Tarik Badwan's family hails from Annaba, Palestine.

== Musical style ==
Loom have been classified under the genres of grunge and punk and have been compared to early 1990s bands such as Nirvana. Loom's motivation is not to copy the sound and style of other grunge bands, but instead to be "a credible rock band with personality" in its own right.

Badwan has been critical of other bands who he thinks are not "aggressive" enough to be called punk or grunge. He also told Q Magazine Loom exists because they are dissatisfied with the quality of current indie bands in the British music scene.

In an interview with The Guardian, Badwan has said he is a fan of cassette tapes because the quality of the cassette suits the kind of music they make. He prefers cassettes because it takes more work and creativity to create the tape and the artwork for it, and because a cassette can also be stored and is more difficult to lose.

== Band members ==
Current

- Tarik Badwan – vocals
- Joshua Fitzgerald – lead guitar
- Matt Marsh – rhythm guitar
- Jack Foster – bass guitar
- Neil Ganesha – drums

Former

- Neil Byrne – Drums
- Filip "Todd" Zieliński – Bass
- Harry Badwan
- Samuel Lister

== Discography ==
=== Albums ===
- LOOM

=== EPs ===
- Lice EP (2 December 2013)

=== Cassette release ===
- Covers (19 August 2013)

=== Singles ===
- "Bleed on Me" / "Lizard" / "She" (3 December 2012)
- "I Get A Taste" / "She's Not There" (25 March 2013)
- "Yosoko" / "Lowdown" (5 May 2014)
- "Hate" / "Bleed on Me" (8 June 2015)
