= Skying =

2011 studio album by the Horrors

Studio album by the Horrors
- Released: 11 July 2011
- Recorded: 2011
- Studios: Offerclass Ltd. (London); Miloco Garden (Shoreditch, London)
- Genres: Post-punk; neo-psychedelia; synth-pop; shoegaze; art rock
- Length: 54:36
- Label: XL
- Producers: The Horrors; Craig Silvey

The Horrors chronology
Primary Colours (2009)	Skying (2011)	Higher (2012)

Singles from Skying
- 1. "Still Life" Released: 11 July 2011; 2. "I Can See Through You" Released: 3 October 2011; 3. "Changing the Rain" Released: 12 March 2012

Skying is the third studio album by English rock band the Horrors, released on 11 July 2011 in the United Kingdom and on 9 August 2011 in the United States on XL Recordings.

== Background and recording ==
Recorded by the group in their self-built London studio, it is the first album they produced themselves. Two months prior to its release, the song "Still Life" was premiered on Zane Lowe's BBC Radio 1 show, where it was played in its entirety and named as his "Hottest Record in the World". This was the first track to be released from the album and the first indicator to fans of the direction the album would take.

== Style ==
The album's sound was noted as including elements of post-punk revival, neo-psychedelia and shoegazing.

== Reception ==
Professional ratings
Aggregate scores
Source	Rating
AnyDecentMusic?	8.2/10
Metacritic	83/100
Review scores
Source	Rating
AllMusic	4/5 stars
The A.V. Club	B+
The Guardian	4/5 stars
The Independent	4/5 stars
Los Angeles Times	3.5/4 stars
Mojo	4/5 stars
NME	8/10
Pitchfork	7.5/10
Q	4/5 stars
Spin	7/10

Skying received considerable attention from the music press before its release, following the overwhelming positive response to Primary Colours. Numerous music publications confirmed it would be their album of the month in upcoming issues including Mojo and Q. The single "Still Life" gained far more media exposure and mainstream radio airplay than previous releases, reaching the Radio 1 A list.

Reviewing the album for BBC Music, Mike Diver wrote, "There's no fault to be found with Skying – truly, every song here hits its mark... From the most incongruous of beginnings, The Horrors have become national treasures in waiting, and now possess the ability to realise any ambitions". Likewise, Clash ran the review as a lead album feature, with writer Joe Zadeh declaring the Horrors as "an intellectually collective five-piece, fully immersed in the confidence of their own astonishing abilities".

Hot Press said: "This is fundamentally a psych-rock record...From the cover – an ethereal sea/sky combo with lens flare at the periphery – to the vague, fuzzy song titles..., Skying is a very tripped-out kind of album, with echoes of the early '90s shoegaze brigade... However, the Horrors have the happy knack of always putting their own distinctive twist on familiar reference points".

The Skinny said that Skying recalls "the more glorious elements of Suede and Simple Minds, the sprawling synthesizers of Orchestral Manoeuvres in the Dark and the tunnel vision chasms of Neu!", calling it "an accomplished record showcasing the Horrors' eclecticism". Phoenix New Times said, "Skying finds the Horrors comfortable in the post-punk, touches-of-shoegaze groove that Colours established."

Mojo placed the album at No. 2 on its list of the "Top 50 albums of 2011" while Uncut placed the album at No. 6. Q placed it at 11. Skying won the Best Album prize at the 2012 NME Awards.

As of January 2012, UK sales stood at 65,000 copies according to The Guardian.

== Track listing ==
No.	Title	Length
1.	"Changing the Rain"	4:36
2.	"You Said"	4:51
3.	"I Can See Through You"	4:22
4.	"Endless Blue"	5:15
5.	"Dive In"	4:56
6.	"Still Life"	5:26
7.	"Wild Eyed"	4:09
8.	"Moving Further Away"	8:39
9.	"Monica Gems"	4:33
10.	"Oceans Burning"	7:54

Japanese CD bonus tracks
No.	Title	Length
11.	"You Said (Ambient Version)"	8:12
12.	"Changing the Rain (Ambient Version)"	8:56

US digital bonus track
No.	Title	Length
11.	"Wild Eyed (Andrew Weatherall Remix)"	7:13

== Personnel ==
The Horrors

- Faris Badwan – vocals
- Joshua Third – guitar
- Tom Furse – keyboards
- Rhys Webb – bass guitar, keyboards
- Joe Spurgeon – drums

Additional personnel

- Derek Watkins, John Barclay, Mark Nightingale, Martin Owen, Richard Edwards, Richard Watkins – horns (tracks 4 and 6)

== Charts ==
Chart performance for Skying
Chart (2011)	Peak position
Scottish Albums (Official Charts)	7
UK Albums (Official Charts)	5
UK Independent Albums (Official Charts)	3
US Billboard 200	97
US Top Album Sales (Billboard)	97
US Top Alternative Albums (Billboard)	12
US Independent Albums (Billboard)	11
US Top Rock Albums (Billboard)	18
US Indie Store Album Sales (Billboard)	3
US Vinyl Albums (Billboard)	4

=== Certifications ===
Region	Certification	Certified units/sales
United Kingdom (BPI)	Silver	60,000^{^}
^{^} Shipments figures based on certification alone.

== Release history ==
Region	Date	Distributing label	Format	Catalog
Australia	8 July 2011	XL	2LP, CD, digital download	2LP: XLLP539; CD: XLCD539
United Kingdom	11 July 2011	XL	2LP, CD, digital download	2LP: XLLP539; CD: XLCD539
United States	9 August 2011	XL	2LP, CD, digital download	2LP: XLLP539; CD: XLCD539
