= Treasure House (album) =

Studio album by Cat's Eyes
- Released: 3 June 2016
- Length: 35:18
- Label: Kobalt Label Services

Cat's Eyes chronology
Cat's Eyes (2011)	Treasure House (2016)

Singles from Treasure House
- 1. "Chameleon Queen" Released: 2 February 2016; 2. "Drag" Released: 24 February 2016

Treasure House is the second album by London-based alternative rock duo Cat's Eyes, released on 3 June 2016 on the Kobalt Label Services record label.

== Accolades ==
Accolades for Treasure House
Publication	Accolade	Year	Rank
The Quietus	Albums of the Year 2016	2016	97
Rough Trade	Albums of the Year	2016	64

== Track listing ==
No.	Title	Length
1.	"Treasure House"	1:54
2.	"Drag"	3:36
3.	"Chameleon Queen"	3:31
4.	"Be Careful Where You Park Your Car"	2:06
5.	"Standoff"	3:43
6.	"Everything Moves Towards the Sun"	3:55
7.	"The Missing Hour"	2:24
8.	"Girl in the Room"	3:37
9.	"We'll Be Waiting"	4:16
10.	"Names on the Mountains"	3:43
11.	"Teardrops"	2:33
Total length:		35:18
