= Loog Records =

- Parent company: Universal Music Group
- Founded: 2003
- Founder: James Oldham
- Genre: Indie rock
- Country of origin: United Kingdom
- Location: London
- Official website: www.loogrecords.co.uk

Loog Records is a UK-based record label, owned by Universal Music Group, and operated as an imprint of Polydor Records. The label was launched in 2003 and managed by former NME editor James Oldham. It is named after former Rolling Stones manager Andrew Loog Oldham. Loog has released recordings by artists such as The Bravery, The Open, The Troubadours, Starky and Hatcham Social.

== Former artists ==
- Chapel Club (parted ways early 2012)
- The Childballads (one-off E.P.)
- The Courteeners
- Effi Briest
- Envy & Other Sins (moved over to A&M before splitting up)
- Hatcham Social (now on Fierce Panda)
- The Horrors (now on XL Recordings)
- Mad Action (split up)
- Patrick Wolf (now on Mercury Records)
- S.C.U.M (now on Mute Records)
