= Faris Badwan =

English musician

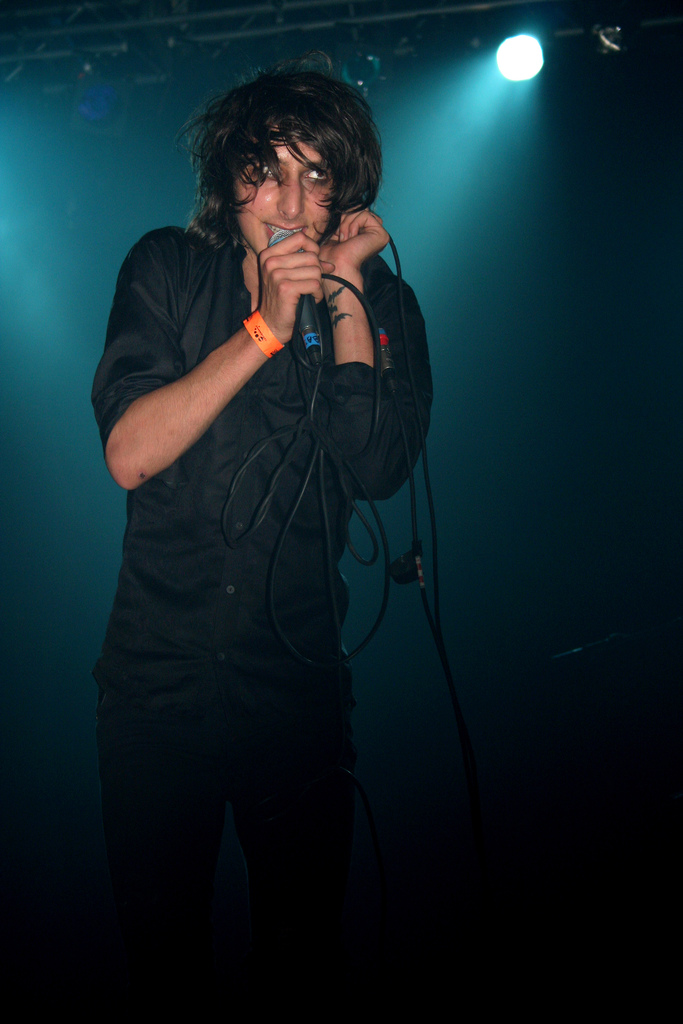
- Badwan in 2006

Background information
- Also known as: Lumina
- Born: Faris Adam Derar Badwan; 21 September 1986 (age 39); Bexley, Kent, England
- Origin: Leamington Spa/Rugby, England
- Genres: Neo-psychedelia, post-punk revival, shoegazing, garage rock revival, alternative rock, classical
- Occupations: Musician, vocalist, artist
- Instruments: Vocals, guitar, keyboards
- Years active: 2005–present
- Labels: Loog; Stolen Transmission; Polydor; XL Recordings
- Member of: The Horrors, Cat's Eyes
- Formerly of: The Rotters

Faris Adam Derar Badwan (born 21 September 1986) is an English musician, best known as the lead vocalist of the Horrors and as half of the duo Cat's Eyes.

== Early life ==
Born in Bexley, Kent on 21 September 1986 to a Palestinian father and English mother, Badwan grew up in Leamington Spa and Hillmorton, Rugby along with three brothers.

Badwan attended the public school Arnold Lodge School in Leamington Spa before obtaining a scholarship in 1999 to the exclusive public boarding school Rugby School, where he met future Horrors bassist and synthesiser player Tom Cowan, also known as Tom Furse. When Badwan was 12 he became friends with future music producer Sophie. Continuing his education, Badwan moved to London to study illustration at Central Saint Martins College of Art and Design in 2004, eventually deferring from his studies to concentrate on his musical career with the band.

== Musical career ==
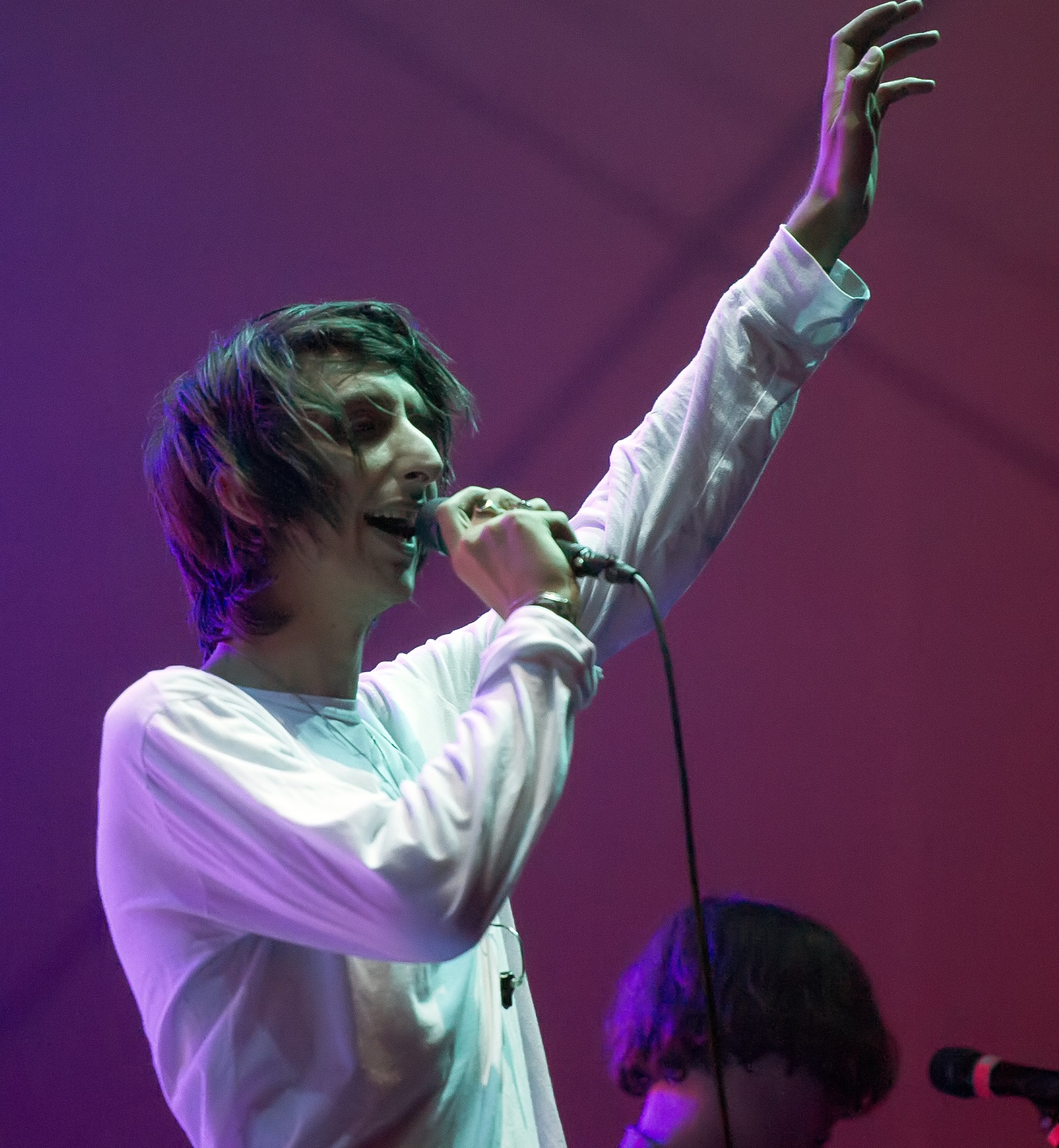
Badwan in 2014

Badwan is best known as vocalist for the Horrors, an alternative rock band formed in Southend-on-Sea in 2005. Their debut album, Strange House, was released in 2007. Badwan became notorious for his onstage activities, which have featured violence, the use of black paint to mark audience members, scaling anything available and using items found in the stage area to antagonise the audience. Badwan and his band were thrown out of venue Great Scott in Boston in 2007 after he accidentally smashed a ceramic bust of Elvis Presley on stage.

Prior to forming the Horrors, Faris took part in pseudo-punk band the Rotters, named after the novel The Rotters' Club by Jonathan Coe.

Faris released a one-off single under the pseudonym of Lumina, teaming up with ex-Ipso Facto member Cherish Kaya to record a cover of the Black Lips song "I'll Be With You". This recording appeared as a B-side on the Black Lips single "Drugs".

Faris appeared on the TV show Soccer AM, scoring in the spot kick challenge. He talked about his love of football, confirming that he is a Blackburn Rovers supporter.

In early 2015, Faris and his brother Tarik Badwan (lead singer of Loom), announced that they would be launching RAFT Records, in partnership with Vinyl Factory. They collaborated with designer Marc Donaldson to create the label's aesthetic. The first release was a four-track double 7-inch EP featuring Skinny Girl Diet, Niqab, Puffer and Jet Black.

On September 21, 2020, American hyperpop artist Dorian Electra announced their project, My Agenda, with Badwan appearing as a featured artist on the track “Iron Fist”. The album was released on October 16, 2020.

== Cat's Eyes ==
In 2011, Faris collaborated with Canadian opera singer Rachel Zeffira under the moniker Cat's Eyes, releasing the Broken Glass EP and a self-titled full-length album.

In February 2015, Cat's Eyes released the soundtrack for Peter Strickland's film The Duke of Burgundy.

== Production ==
In 2016 Badwan produced "Stained", the debut single by acclaimed London-based band, HMLTD.

In February 2017, Hercules & Love Affair released the single "Controller", featuring Badwan on vocals.

In 2018, the Norwich-based duo Let's Eat Grandma released their second album, "I'm All Ears", featuring two songs co-written and produced by Badwan and Sophie, "Hot Pink" and "It's Not Just Me". The LP went on to win Album of the Year at the Q Awards, where Badwan presented the band with their award.

== Artwork ==
Badwan's illustrations have also earned admiration; his artwork has been featured on releases by the Horrors, the Charlatans and Hatcham Social, and in Vice magazine.

His "Drawing a Straight Number Nine" exhibition in London featured a drawing series of 100 new works by the frontman. Due to its popularity, it was then taken to Milan, Italy.

In September 2021, Badwan's new exhibition, "Call and Response", opened at the Masterpiece Gallery in Dubai. A collection of paintings inspired by phone conversations during the pandemic, Badwan "utilised each call to document and decipher the unintentional interpretations of conversation". In an interview with Emirati publication The National, Badwan explained, “I’ve always been interested in the looseness and natural feeling of the drawings you make when you’re on the phone – when your mind is completely clear and you are having a conversation, meanwhile your hand is engaged in some parallel dialogue.”
