= The Horrors =

English rock band

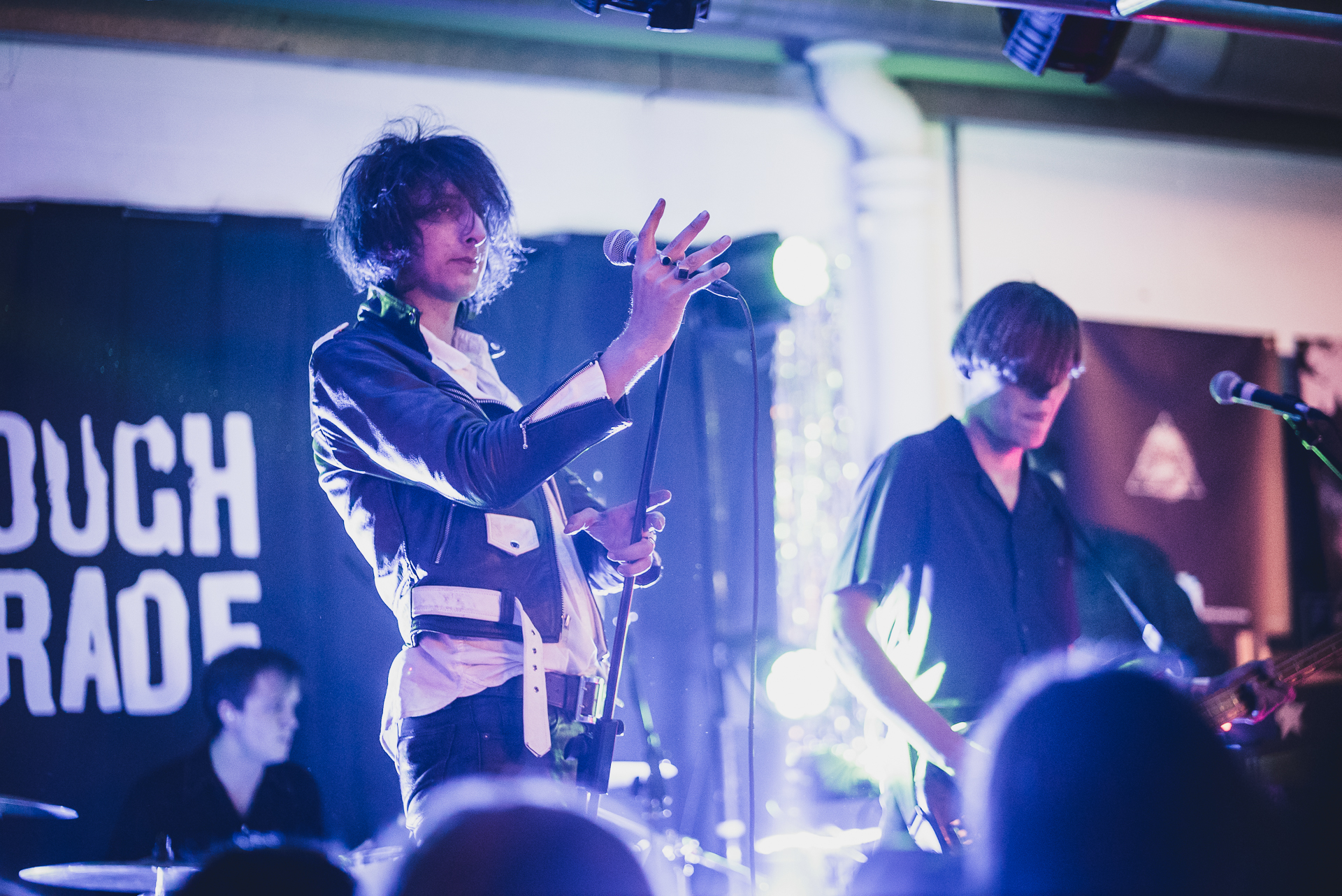
- The Horrors in 2017

Background information
- Origin: Southend-on-Sea, Essex, England
- Genres: Post-punk revival; garage rock; garage punk; gothic rock; shoegaze
- Years active: 2005–present
- Labels: Stolen Transmission; Loog; Wolf Tone; XL
- Spinoffs: Cat's Eyes
- Members: Faris Badwan; Rhys Webb; Amelia Kidd; Jordan Cook; John Victor
- Past members: Tom Furse; Joseph Spurgeon; Joshua Hayward
- Website: thehorrors.co.uk

The Horrors are an English rock band formed in Southend-on-Sea in 2005 by lead vocalist Faris Badwan, guitarist Joshua Hayward, keyboardist and synthesizer player Tom Furse, bassist Rhys Webb, and drummer Joe Spurgeon. Their music has been classified as garage rock, garage punk, gothic rock, shoegaze and post-punk revival.

The band's current lineup consists of Badwan, Webb, Amelia Kidd (of The Ninth Wave) on keyboards and backing vocals, Jordan Cook (of Telegram) on drums and John Victor (Gengahr) on guitar. The band have released six studio albums, the first five of which have charted within the UK Top 40: Strange House (2007), Primary Colours (2009), Skying (2011), Luminous (2014), V (2017), and Night Life (2025).

== History ==
=== Origins (2005–2006) ===
In the early 2000s, the Horrors coalesced around shared interests in obscure vinyl and DJing. During trips to London and on the Southend circuit, Webb met Badwan (formerly of the Rotters) and Furse through their mutual interest in 1960s garage rock as well as post-punk bands such as the Birthday Party and Bauhaus. Other influences on the group have included Screaming Lord Sutch, the Sonics, the Monks, My Bloody Valentine, the Cure and OMD.

In 2005, the three formed a band with Hayward and Spurgeon. The band was centred around Junk, an underground club founded by Webb and Oliver Abbott. Their first rehearsal consisted of two covers: the Sonics' "The Witch" and Screaming Lord Sutch's "Jack the Ripper" which was interpreted in the tradition of previous garage covers such as those by the Fuzztones, One-Way Streets and the Gruesomes. The latter rendition was later rerecorded as the opening track of their debut album, Strange House. The Horrors made their first live performance at The Spread Eagle on Kingsland Road in London on 16 August 2005.

The Horrors drew the attention of critics and the public with their debut single, "Sheena Is a Parasite". Their second release, "Death at the Chapel", a high-profile show at London's 100 Club in July 2006, and an appearance on the cover of NME that August greatly increased their profile. The band played the NME Awards Indie Rock Tour in early 2007 along with Mumm-Ra, the View and the Automatic, which helped garner further fame.

=== Strange House (2007–2008) ===
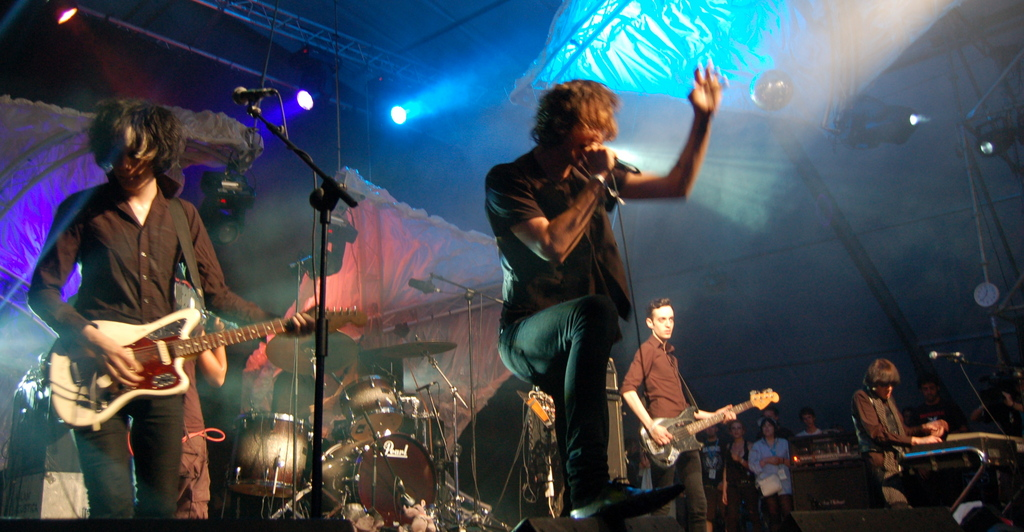
The Horrors in 2007

After the release of Strange House in March 2007, the Horrors embarked on an 18-month promotional world tour. A slot supporting Black Rebel Motorcycle Club in the United States in summer 2007 was cancelled because of lack of funds, but the band instead headlined a US tour that June. They made a number of festival appearances throughout 2007, including the Glastonbury Festival, the Carling Weekend (on the Radio 1/NME stage), various Scandinavian festivals, the Summer Sonic Festival in Japan and Splendour in the Grass in Australia. Their setlists throughout that summer included a cover of "No Love Lost" by Joy Division. In December 2007, they featured in the All Tomorrows Parties festival curated by Geoff Barrow of Portishead. The Horrors also appeared in the third series of The Mighty Boosh in December as the fictional band "the Black Tubes", and supported the Arctic Monkeys on their short sellout tour of the UK, receiving a mixed reception. The band played an NME Awards show in 2008 with Crystal Castles, Ulterior and These New Puritans, and supported the Sonics on 23 March. Another London show followed at Bethnal Green's Rich Mix Cultural Foundation on 23 May of the following year. On 18 January 2008, Counting in Fives, a documentary of the band's 2007 US tour, was unveiled at the Sundance Film Festival.

Eventually, Strange House reached No. 37 on the UK Albums Chart. Following the "She Is the New Thing" single release in June 2007, the band recorded a cover of Suicide's "Shadazz" for Blast First Petite as part of their tribute to Alan Vega in October 2008, their only release before their new material in 2009.

=== Primary Colours (2009–2010) ===
After they left Loog Records in 2007, the band signed to XL Recordings. At the end of 2007, the Horrors announced the forthcoming recording of a new album, which was produced by the band, Craig Silvey, Barrow and music video director Chris Cunningham. Recording took place in Bath during the summer of 2008. Barrow's influence brought the more prominent use of keyboards and electronics, which was of particular interest to bassist Tom Furse – leading him to ultimately swap instruments with then-keyboardist Rhys Webb in the band's line-up.

The album's first single, "Sea Within a Sea", was released only as a digital download on 17 March 2009, together with a music video directed by Douglas Hart which was posted on the band's website on the same day. Their second album, Primary Colours, was officially released on 4 May 2009 to critical acclaim, and reached No. 25 on the UK Albums Chart. The single "Who Can Say" was released on 7" vinyl one week later.

Primary Colours was nominated for the 2009 Mercury Prize. NME later awarded the album first place in the 50 Best Albums of 2009. After headlining London's Offset Festival and touring for Primary Colours, the Horrors indicated a desire to build their own studio to record at obscure hours.

=== Skying (2011–2012) ===
In April 2010, singer Badwan announced on the band's official forum that the Horrors had already started working on their third album, to be called Skying, and had been in the studio for some months. A track from the album, "Endless Blue", was first unveiled at the Latitude Festival in July 2010, and later performed at Poland's Off Festival and Belgium's Lokerse Feesten in August 2010. In February 2011, after rumours that the album had been delayed, Badwan announced via the official forum that the album would be released in July. The first single, "Still Life", premiered on 24 May on Zane Lowe's BBC Radio 1 show. The full album was made available for streaming from the band's website on 4 July and officially released on 11 July 2011.

The band were announced as headliners on the Festival Republic Stage at the Reading and Leeds festivals in August 2011. They were joined on stage by the Vaccines, whose guitarist is Tom Furse's younger brother Freddie Cowan; Tom Furse had also joined the Vaccines on stage earlier on the same day. They were also chosen to perform at the ATP I'll Be Your Mirror festival curated by ATP and Portishead in September 2011 in Asbury Park, New Jersey. In November 2011, The Horrors remixed Lady Gaga's song "Bloody Mary" for the singer's compilation album, Born This Way: The Remix.

The band joined Florence and The Machine on the UK and Ireland leg of her Ceremonials Tour in March 2012. They also headlined the Word Arena tent of 2012's Latitude Festival. In December 2012, the Horrors released the remix vinyl box set Higher.

=== Luminous (2013–2014) ===
The Horrors headlined the Truck Festival in Oxfordshire on 19 July 2013 and the Y Not Festival in Derbyshire on 4 August 2013.

The band's fourth studio album, Luminous, was released on 5 May 2014. The record was self-produced and recorded in their own studio in Hackney, London. It was described as being "fun and danceable".

=== V (2015–2020) ===
In June 2015, Badwan said that the band were working on an album with producer Paul Epworth, and were aiming to release it before the end of 2015. They supported New Order in November 2015, and played several festivals in 2016, including the Victorious Festival in Portsmouth, UK on 28 August.

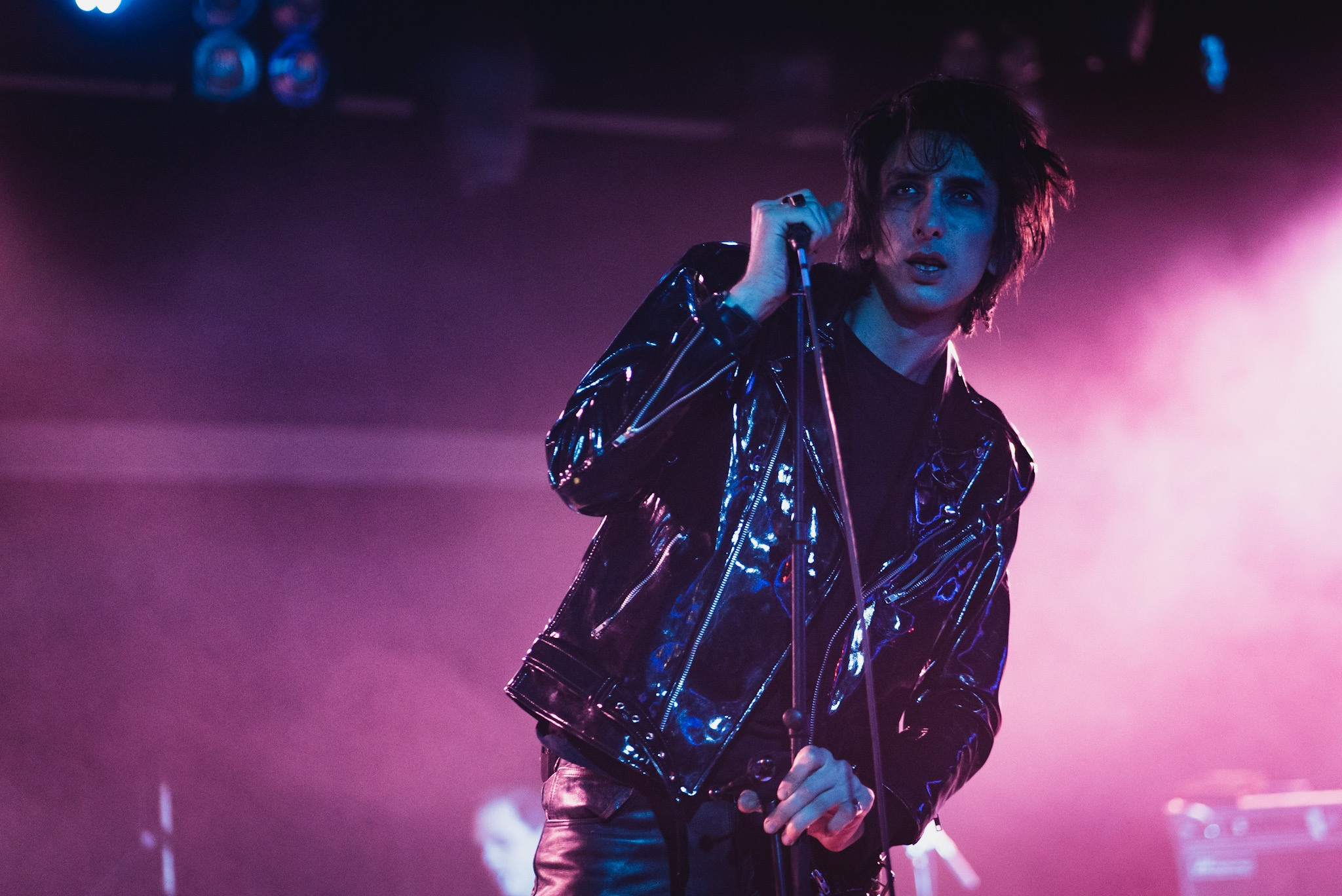
The Horrors performing in 2018

In June 2017, they supported Depeche Mode for part of the latter's Global Spirit Tour. On 13 June, they announced the release of a new single, "Machine". It premiered via BBC 6 Music. On 28 June, they announced the release of their fifth album, titled V, which was released on 22 September. The band previewed the album's release with a small show at London's Omeara on 11 July, while a full UK tour had been announced for October in support of the new album.

=== Lout and Against the Blade (2021) ===
On 12 March 2021, the band released their third EP, Lout and released their fourth EP, Against the Blade, on 5 November 2021. The two featured the band performing in a techno-industrial style. The band announced on 16 November 2021 that keyboardist Tom Furse would not be performing live with the Horrors "for the foreseeable future," with Furse clarifying he would still contribute to their studio recordings.

=== Night Life (2024–present) ===
On 2 October 2024, the band shared a new song after three years since their Lout EP, "The Silence That Remains". It was released as the lead single off their upcoming sixth album, Night Life. It was released on 21 March 2025 via Fiction Records. The band's founding members Badwan, Hayward, and Webb were all involved in the making of the album, also featuring their new members Amelia Kidd on keyboards and backing vocals and Jordan Cook on drums.

== Side projects ==
Rhys Webb and Tom Furse released an EP called Something Clockwork This Way Comes (2009) under their side project name Spider and the Flies, influenced by the experimental electronica of the BBC Radiophonic Workshop.

Badwan teamed up with ex-Ipso Facto member Cherish Kaya, calling themselves Lumina, to record a cover of the Black Lips song "I'll Be With You" (which appeared as a B-side on the Black Lips single "Drugs"). Badwan formed Cat's Eyes with multi-instrumentalist, composer and soprano vocalist Rachel Zeffira, releasing the Broken Glass EP and self-titled full-length album in 2011, the soundtrack to The Duke of Burgundy in 2015, and Treasure House in 2016.

In 2015, Tom Furse announced the 28 August release of his debut solo EP, Child of a Shooting Star, through the official Lo Recordings website. That same year he also released the library music compilation album Tom Furse Digs. His album Interludes was released in 2016, made in one week and using only the OP-1 synthesiser. Furse is also involved with MIEN, featuring members of The Black Angels, The Earlies, Swans and Elephant Stone, who released their self-titled debut album in 2018.

In 2021 Webb also joined the garage punk band the Shadracks playing bass. Members of the Horrors have also played with the Diddlers (a Bo Diddley cover band), Cramped (a Cramps cover band) and Heavy Bunny.

== Band members ==
=== Current ===
- Faris Badwan (a.k.a. Faris Rotter) – lead vocals (2005–present)
- Rhys Webb (a.k.a. Spider Webb) – bass (2008–present), keyboards, organ (2005–2008, 2011–2024), percussion, backing vocals (2005–2008)
- Amelia "Millie" Kidd – keyboards, backing vocals (2024–present)
- Jordan Cook – drums, percussion (2024–present)
- John Victor – guitar (2025–present)

=== Former ===
- Tom Furse – bass (2005–2008), keyboards, synthesiser, percussion (2008–2021)
- Joseph Spurgeon (a.k.a. Coffin Joe) – drums, percussion, backing vocals (2005–2024)
- Joshua Hayward (a.k.a. Joshua Von Grimm and Joshua Third) – guitar, piano (2005–2025)
- Robert Tawny – guitar (2025; touring)

== Discography ==
Studio albums

- Strange House (2007)
- Primary Colours (2009)
- Skying (2011)
- Luminous (2014)
- V (2017)
- Night LIfe (2025)
