= Fatma Mohamed =

Romanian actress

Fatma Mohamed (born 1975) is a Romanian actress known for her appearances in all five of director Peter Strickland's feature films, namely Katalin Varga, Berberian Sound Studio, The Duke of Burgundy, In Fabric and Flux Gourmet.

Mohamed was nominated for a best supporting actress award by the International Cinephile Society for her role in In Fabric. Interviewed in 2019, Strickland said about Mohamed: "Each film I did with her, I realized there were more and more sides to her."

Mohamed grew up in Cluj.

== Selected films ==
- Flux Gourmet (2022)
- In Fabric (2018)
- The Field Guide to Evil (2018)
- Box (2015)
- The Duke of Burgundy (2014)
- Berberian Sound Studio (2012)
- Katalin Varga (2009)
