= Richard Bremmer =

English actor (born 1953)

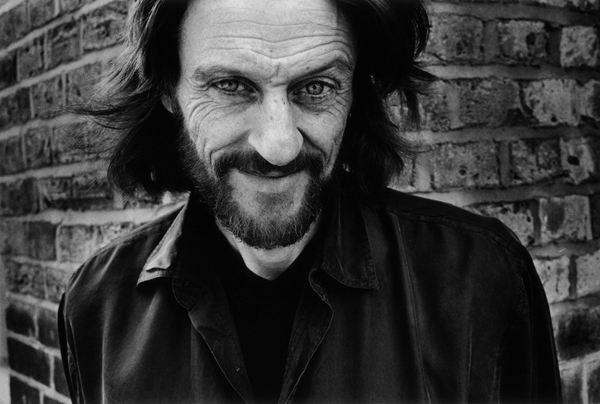
- Born: 27 January 1953 (age 73); Warwickshire, England
- Occupations: Actor, voice actor
- Years active: 1981–present

Richard Bremmer (born 27 January 1953) is an English actor.

== Early life ==
Bremmer was born and brought up in Warwickshire.

== Career ==
Bremmer first began his career in the short film of Couples and Robbers before being in his first full-length film The Girl with Brains in Her Feet. He was the first to portray the character Lord Voldemort in Harry Potter and the Philosopher's Stone (with the footage he appears in being reused in Harry Potter and the Deathly Hallows – Part 2), in a flashback sequence where the famous villain arrived at the home of the titular character's parents to kill them, though Bremmer's face is never seen (later in the film, the character is CGI and voiced by Ian Hart, the actor who played Quirrell in the same film). He was cast as Skeld in The 13th Warrior and also appeared in the 2004 film Viper in the Fist, an adaptation of the novel of the same name by Hervé Bazin.

Bremmer's stage credits include A Midsummer Night's Dream, Julius Caesar, Rosencrantz and Guildenstern Are Dead, King Lear and MacBeth. He has appeared in movies such as the 2014 biographical drama Mr. Turner, the 2015 adventure-drama In the Heart of the Sea, the 2007 biographical drama Control, the 2003 action comedy Shanghai Knights and the 2001 comedy film Just Visiting. His television credits include the fantasy drama series Beowulf: Return to the Shieldlands, the historical drama series The Borgias, the adventure-drama series Crusoe, and the docudrama Dunkirk.

== Filmography ==
=== Film ===
Year	Title	Role	Notes
1981	Couples and Robbers	PC	
1997	The Girl with Brains in Her Feet	Vic	
1999	The 13th Warrior	Skeld	Beowulf & Grendel
1999	Onegin	Diplomat at ball	
2001	Just Visiting	King Henry	
2001	Harry Potter and the Philosopher’s Stone	Lord Voldemort	Voice provided by Ian Hart
2002	Half Past Dead	Sonny Eckvall	
2003	Shanghai Knights	Master at Arms	
2003	To Kill a King	Abraham	
2003	The Sin Eater	Bookstore Owner	
2004	Ripper 2: Letter from Within	Dr. Weisser	
2004	Viper in the Fist	L'abbé Traquet	
2007	Control	Ian's Father	
2011	Harry Potter and the Deathly Hallows – Part 2	Lord Voldemort	Archive footage
2011	The Power of Three	Donald	
2012	City Slacker	Matt	
2014	Mr Turner	George Jones	
2015	In the Heart of the Sea	Benjamin Fuller	
2016	Swallows and Amazons	Old Billy	
2018	In Fabric	Mr. Lundy	
2019	Star Wars: The Rise of Skywalker	First Order officer #5	
2022	Flux Gourmet	Dr. Glock	

=== Television ===
Year	Title	Role	Notes
1981	Juliet Bravo	Thomas Briggs	Episode: "Unpicking the Stitches"
1982	Made in Britain	Policeman #2	TV film
1984	Miracles Take Longer		
1985	By the Sword Divided	Escort Commander	Episode: "The Mailed Fist"
1985	Theatre Night		Episode: "Trelawny of the 'Wells'"
1986	Zastrozzi: A Romance	Petrol Attendant	TV mini-series
1993	Scarlet and the Black	Laughing Coachman	Episode #1.2
1994–1996	The Bill	Ted the Barman; Ian Wilson	Episodes: "Final Straw", "Hedging Your Bets"
1988	Picking Up the Pieces	Neil	Episode #1.8
1999	Peak Practice	Nick Bowman	Episode: "No Bounds"
2004	Coronation Street	Malcolm Phillips	Episode #1.5829
2004	Casualty	Willie Malloy	Episode: "Past Imperfect"
2006	Marple	Mr Sim	Episode: "Sleeping Murder"
2008–2009	Crusoe	Gallerne	Episodes: "Name of the Game", "The Traveler"
2010	Holby City	Norman	Episode: "Get Busy Living"
2011	The Borgias	Notary	Episode: "The Poisoned Chalice"
2012	Richard II	Abbot of Westminster	Filmed production of the Shakespeare play as part of The Hollow Crown series on BBC2
2013	Murder on the Home Front	Charlie Maxton	TV film
2016	Our Zoo	Casper Butterfield	TV mini-series
2016	Beowulf: Return to the Shieldlands	Roth	Episode #1.4
2018	The Alienist	Mortician	Episode: "A Fruitful Partnership"
2018	Into the Badlands	Old Man	Episode: "Chapter XX: Blind Cannibal Assassins"
2020	The Third Day	Old Man	Episodes: "Friday – The Father" "Saturday – The Son" "Sunday – The Ghost"
