= Berberian Sound Studio =

- British film poster
- Directed by: Peter Strickland
- Written by: Peter Strickland; Kephas Leroc
- Based on: Berberian Sound Studio by Peter Strickland
- Produced by: Scott Page
- Starring: Toby Jones; Antonio Mancino; Fatma Mohamed
- Cinematography: Nicholas D. Knowland
- Edited by: Chris Dickens
- Music by: Broadcast
- Production companies: UK Film Council; Film4; Warp X ITV Yorkshire
- Distributed by: Artificial Eye
- Release dates: 28 June 2012 (Edinburgh Film Festival); 31 August 2012 (United Kingdom)
- Running time: 94 minutes
- Country: United Kingdom
- Languages: English, Italian
- Box office: $31,641

Berberian Sound Studio is a 2012 British psychological horror film. It is the second feature film by British director and screenwriter Peter Strickland. The film, which stars Toby Jones, is set in a 1970s Italian horror film studio.

== Plot ==
British sound engineer Gilderoy (Toby Jones) arrives at the Berberian film studio in Italy to work on what he believes is a film about horses. During a surreal meeting with Francesco, the film's producer, Gilderoy is shocked to find the film is actually an Italian giallo film, The Equestrian Vortex. He nonetheless begins work in the studio, at one point made to do Foley work, using vegetables to create sound effects for the film's increasingly gory torture sequences, and mixing voiceovers from session artists Silvia and Claudia into the score.

As time passes, and Gilderoy feels more and more disconnected from his mother at home, he begins to fear he is out of his depth. Gilderoy's colleagues seem increasingly rude—to both himself and to each other. The horror sequences grow ever more shocking, yet Santini, the director, refuses to admit they are working on a horror film. And, after a long passage through the bureaucracy of the film studio's accounts department, it turns out the plane ticket Gilderoy submitted for a refund can't be processed because the flight did not actually exist.

The plot, from here on in, grows increasingly erratic. Gilderoy hears and sees things in the night. He discovers that Silvia, the voiceover artist, was molested by Santini. She storms out, destroying much of their work, forcing Gilderoy to re-record the dialogue with a new actress, Elisa. As Silvia's recording sequences are revisited, and tension grows between Gilderoy and the others, the boundaries between the blood-drenched giallo thriller and real life begin to erode. Gilderoy imagines he himself is in a film about his life—suddenly fluent in Italian and increasingly detached and vicious.

After he and Francesco find Elisa's screams less than adequate during a recording session, Gilderoy volunteers to torture her with dissonant and shrill sounds in order to elicit the perfect scream. Instead, she walks out, and it is left ambiguous whether he was attempting to hurt her out of malice or secretly trying to drive her away and prevent history from repeating itself. In a final shot, during a power cut, Gilderoy turns on the movie projector, creating an incandescent light on the screen which absorbs him before the films cuts to black.

== Cast ==
- Toby Jones as Gilderoy
- Tonia Sotiropoulou as Elena
- Susanna Cappellaro as Veronica as Accused Witch
- Cosimo Fusco as Francesco
- Katalin Ladik as herself / Resurrected Witch
- Antonio Mancino as Giancarlo Santini
- Fatma Mohamed as Silvia as Teresa
- Chiara D'Anna as Elisa as Teresa
- Eugenia Caruso as Claudia as Monica (Screamer)
- Suzy Kendall as Gilderoy's Mother (Special Guest Screamer)
- Salvatore Li Causi as Fabio
- Guido Adorni as Lorenzo
- Lara Parmiani as Chiara as Signore Collatina
- Josef Cseres as Massimo
- Pal Toth as Massimo
- Jean-Michel Van Schouwburg as The Goblin

== Background ==
Strickland made a version in 2005 as a short film, prior to working on his first feature film, Katalin Varga, in 2006. He said that with the film, he wanted to "make a film where everything that is usually hidden in cinema, the mechanics of film itself, is made visible. Berberian... turns this on its head. Here, the film is out of view, and you only see the mechanics behind it".

== Reception ==
Berberian Sound Studio premiered on 28 June 2012 at the Edinburgh International Film Festival, where The Daily Telegraph described it as the "stand-out movie". It was presented at the London FrightFest Film Festival in August 2012. Peter Bradshaw of The Guardian has described the film as "seriously weird and seriously good" and said that it marks Strickland's emergence as "a key British film-maker of his generation".

Review aggregation website Rotten Tomatoes gives the film a score of 85% based on 98 reviews, with an average rating of 7.22/10. The critical consensus states that "Its reach may exceed its grasp, but with Berberian Sound Studio, director Peter Strickland assembles a suitably twisted, creepy tribute to the Italian Giallo horror movies of the '70s that benefits from a strong central performance by Toby Jones." Metacritic gives a weighted average rating of 80 based on reviews from 22 critics, indicating "generally favorable reviews".

Sight & Sound film magazine listed the film at number 5 on its list of best films of 2012. The film tied with A Royal Affair as Mark Kermode's best film of the year. The film won awards at the 2012 British Independent Film Awards Best Director, Best Actor, Best Technical Achievement (Sound) and Best Achievement In Production. In 2013, the film obtained the Best (International) Film Award at BAFICI.

== Home video release ==
Berberian Sound Studio was released on DVD in the UK by Artificial Eye on 31 December 2012. It has been given a 15 certificate by the BBFC. It came with either English subtitles for the Italian dialogue, or vice versa, as well the option to watch "naturalistically"; without subtitles of any sort. Foreign or hard of hearing subtitles, however, would typically subtitle and translate both languages.

== Soundtrack ==
The soundtrack was composed by British band Broadcast and released by Warp in January 2013.

== Stage adaptation ==
The screenplay was adapted for the stage by Joel Horwood and Tom Scutt, being first shown in London's Donmar Warehouse in 2019.

== See also ==
- List of films featuring fictional films
