= Gwendoline Christie =

British actress (born 1978)

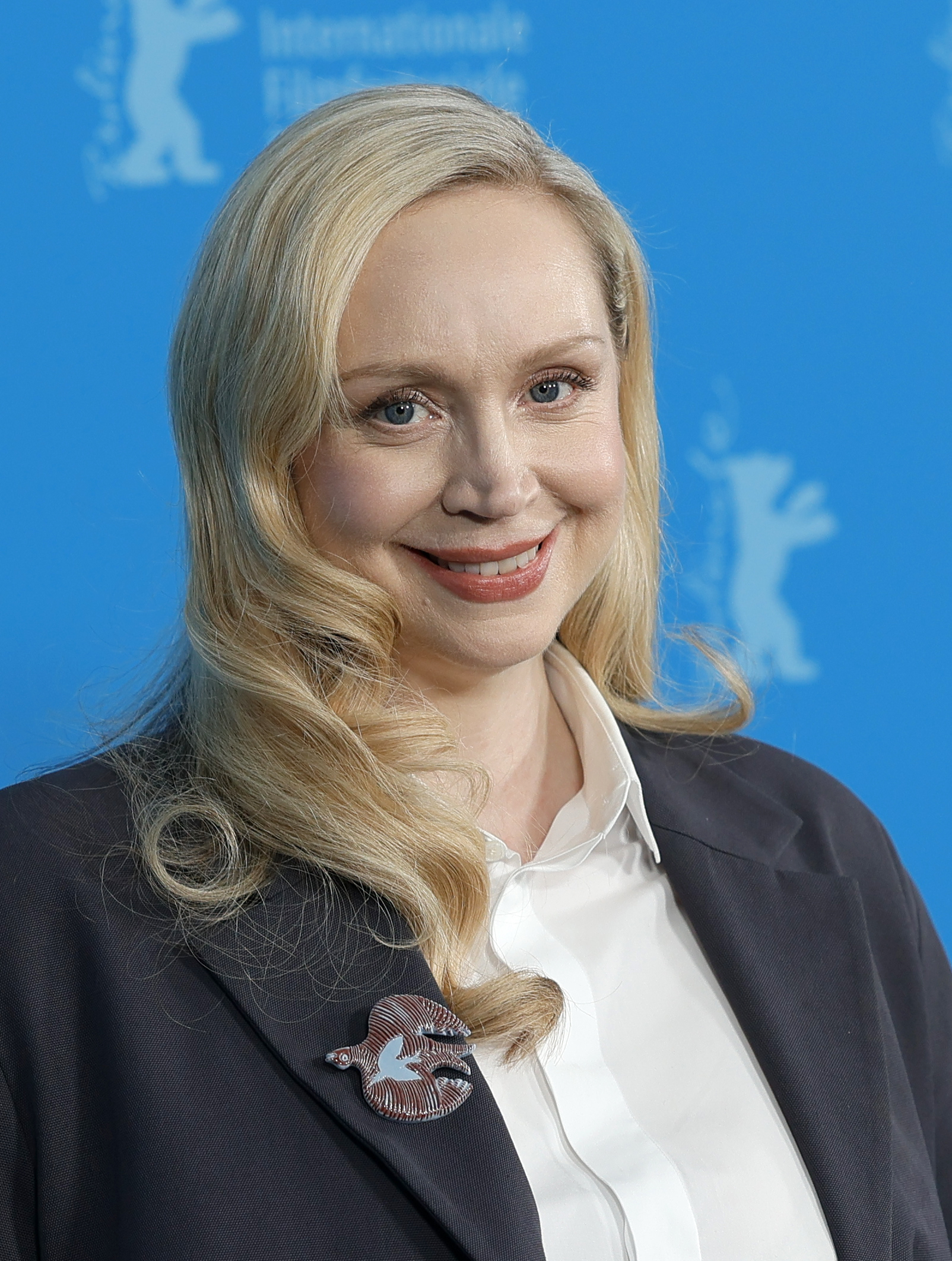
- Christie at Berlinale in 2025
- Born: Gwendoline Tracey Philippa Christie; 28 October 1978 (age 48); Worthing, West Sussex, England
- Education: Drama Centre London
- Occupation: Actress
- Years active: 2006–present
- Height: 1.91 m (6 ft 3 in)
- Partner: Giles Deacon (2014–present)

Gwendoline Tracey Philippa Christie (born 28 October 1978) is a British actress. She is known for portraying Brienne of Tarth in the HBO fantasy-drama series Game of Thrones (2012–2019), and the First Order stormtrooper Captain Phasma in the films Star Wars: The Force Awakens (2015) and Star Wars: The Last Jedi (2017). For the former, she received a nomination for the Primetime Emmy Award for Outstanding Supporting Actress in a Drama Series in 2019. Christie has since appeared in the Netflix fantasy series The Sandman and Wednesday (both 2022), and the Apple TV+ sci-fi thriller series Severance (2025), for which she received a Primetime Emmy Award for Outstanding Guest Actress in a Drama Series nomination in 2025.

== Early life and education ==
Gwendoline Tracey Philippa Christie was born in Worthing, West Sussex. She has two older half-brothers. Her mother was a housewife, and her father worked in sales and marketing. She grew up in a hamlet near the South Downs, attending Henfield Primary School and Warden Park Secondary School. As a child she trained as a gymnast but took up acting after a spinal injury at the age of 11. Around 2002, she worked in a boutique in Brighton.

After attending Varndean College in Brighton and Hove, she graduated from Drama Centre London in 2005. She was told she "would probably never work because she didn't look the same as most actors", due to her unconventionally tall physique, and was even told "well, good luck with that" by her agent after stating she would like to work on screen. She was inspired to continue pursuing this goal by Tilda Swinton's performance in Orlando. In a 2017 interview, she recalled thinking "Well, she is in a film, she is otherworldly, and is definitely outside the room. I realised that maybe there is a place for me too."

== Career ==
=== Stage actress and early screen career (2006–2011) ===
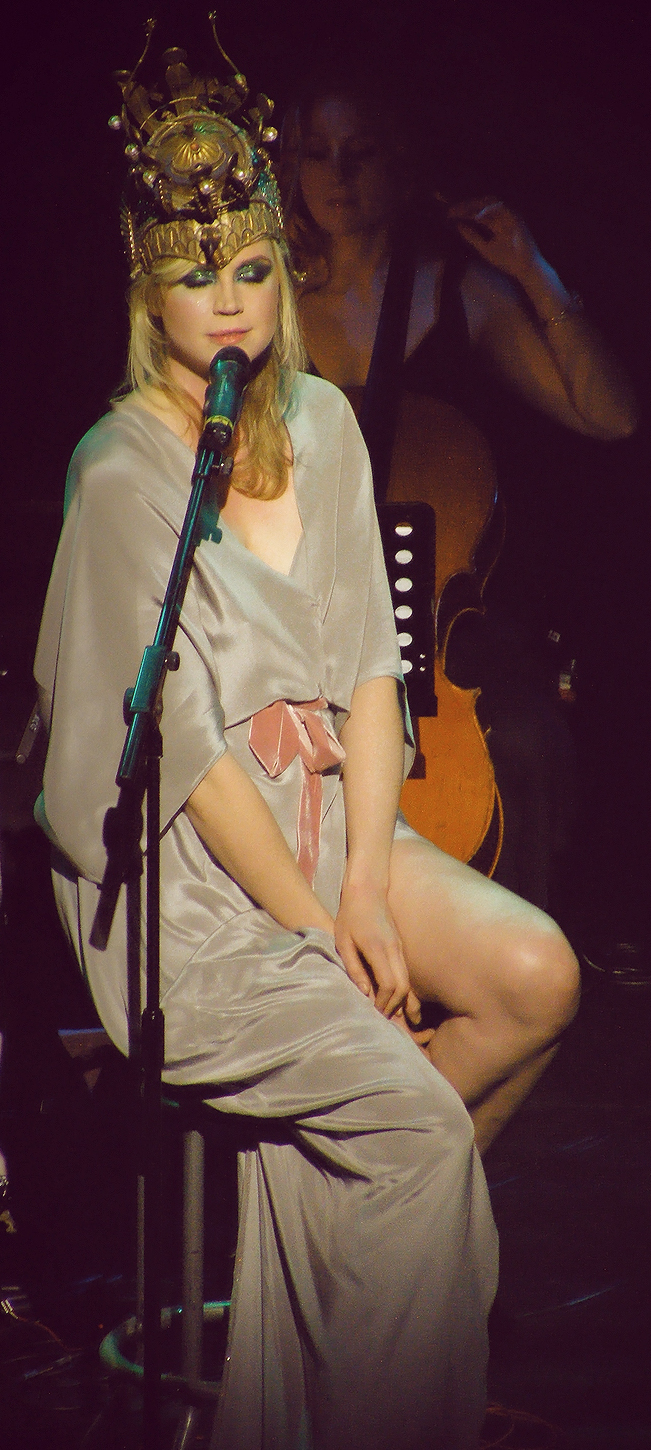
Christie performing at the London Palladium in 2009

In 2002, Christie's height attracted the attention of photographer Polly Borland, who made Christie the subject of a noted series of photographs, titled Bunny, between 2002 and 2008. According to Christie, she felt then that the photographs in which she appears mostly nude could help her come to terms with her body, and challenge notions of femininity. However, she later said that she was shocked in retrospect that she had agreed to them.

Christie's mentor since drama school has been actor and author Simon Callow. Her theatrical career includes a performance as the Queen in Shakespeare's Cymbeline opposite Tom Hiddleston, portraying Mag Wildwood in Breakfast at Tiffany's, and "standing out" as Lucifer in Marlowe's Doctor Faustus (2010).

On screen, Christie debuted with a 2007 short film titled The Time Surgeon, written and directed by Nathaniel Mellors. In the following years, she continued to appear in his works, such as Seven Ages of Britain Teaser, a short TV film acting as an introduction to the final episode of the documentary series Seven Ages of Britain, and the first four films of his Ourhouse series of experimental short films, released between 2010 and 2011 as parts of art exhibitions or in selected public screenings. She was also involved in Ourhouse behind the scenes, acting as associate producer and being credited for casting, costumes, props, and make-up. Meanwhile, she made her feature film debut with a minor role in the Terry Gilliam film The Imaginarium of Doctor Parnassus in 2009. In 2009 she joined Patrick Wolf in the music video for "Damaris".

=== Joining Game of Thrones and Wizards vs Aliens (2011–2015) ===
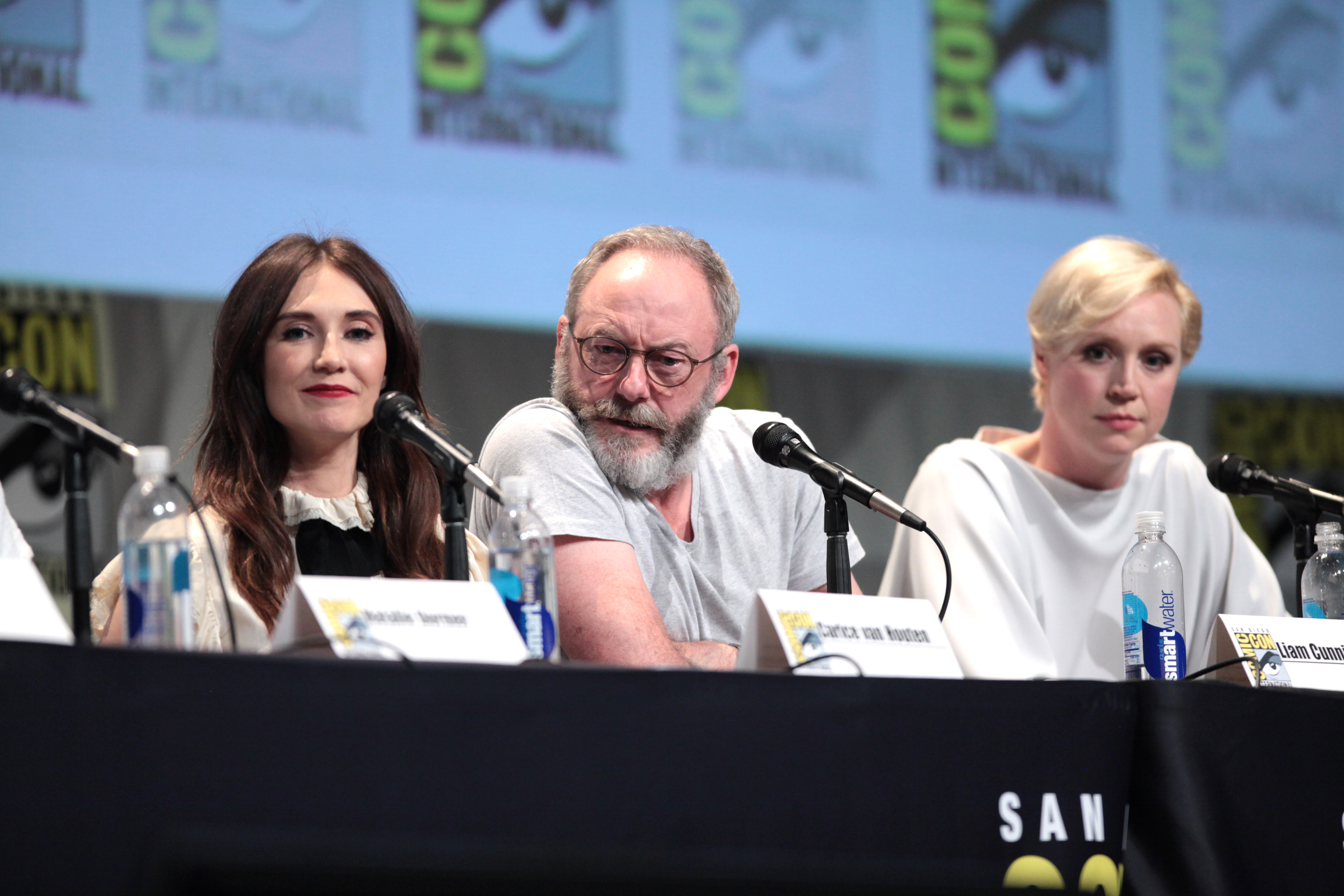
Christie with her Game of Thrones co-stars Carice van Houten and Liam Cunningham at San Diego Comic-Con in 2015

In July 2011, Christie was cast as the warrior Brienne of Tarth in the second season of HBO's fantasy TV series Game of Thrones. Her character, an unusually tall, muscular, and plain-looking woman, is a favourite among many readers of the novels, and Christie had been proposed for the role by fans long before auditions took place. Christie said that she could draw on her own experiences of having been bullied for her height and androgynous looks to play the part of Brienne, a role that she was passionate to play after reading the A Song of Ice and Fire novels which the show adapts. To prepare for the auditions, she started wearing unisex clothing to help her get into her character's more masculine mindset, and took up an intensive training regime, gaining over a stone (6.4 kg) of muscle mass. According to series co-writer, producer, and author of the novels, George R. R. Martin, she obtained the role practically without debate after an arresting audition at which she appeared already made up and costumed as Brienne. After being cast in the role, she prepared for it by working out extensively, taking horsemanship, sword-fighting, and stagefighting lessons.

Her debut was in the second season's third episode, "What Is Dead May Never Die", which aired on 15 April 2012. Her debut performance was well received by critics. Nina Shen Rastogi praised her "eloquent and economical physical performance", noting that her walk, stance, and mien effectively conveyed Brienne's single-minded devotion to her self-given quest to become a knight. For her performance as Brienne in the show's third season, Christie was nominated for the Saturn Award for Best Supporting Actress on Television in 2014. As a part of the cast, she was also nominated for a total of four Screen Actors Guild Awards for Outstanding Performance by an Ensemble in a Drama Series (she was not a part of the nominated cast in certain years depending on her number of appearances each season).

In addition to her role in Game of Thrones, Christie appeared in the British science fantasy series Wizards vs Aliens by Doctor Who writers Russell T Davies and Phil Ford from 2012 to 2013, in the main role of Lexi, the 17-year-old Princess of the Nekross, the alien species invading earth. For the role, she wore heavy make-up, although she also appeared with her usual physique as Lucy, the human form of Lexi. She also had a minor role in another Terry Gilliam movie, The Zero Theorem, released in 2013.

=== Star Wars and Top of the Lake (2015–present) ===
In 2015, Christie played Commander Lyme in the fourth installment in The Hunger Games film series, The Hunger Games: Mockingjay – Part 2. Actress Lily Rabe had signed on for the part previously, but had to back out due to scheduling conflicts. The same year, she joined the cast of Swallows and Amazons as Mrs. Blackett, but later dropped out.

Also in 2015, Christie co-starred in Star Wars: The Force Awakens, as Captain Phasma, one of the film's supporting antagonists. Her performance and the character's design were both praised, but some were critical of her character's relatively small role in the film, particularly proportionate to her prominence in promotional materials.

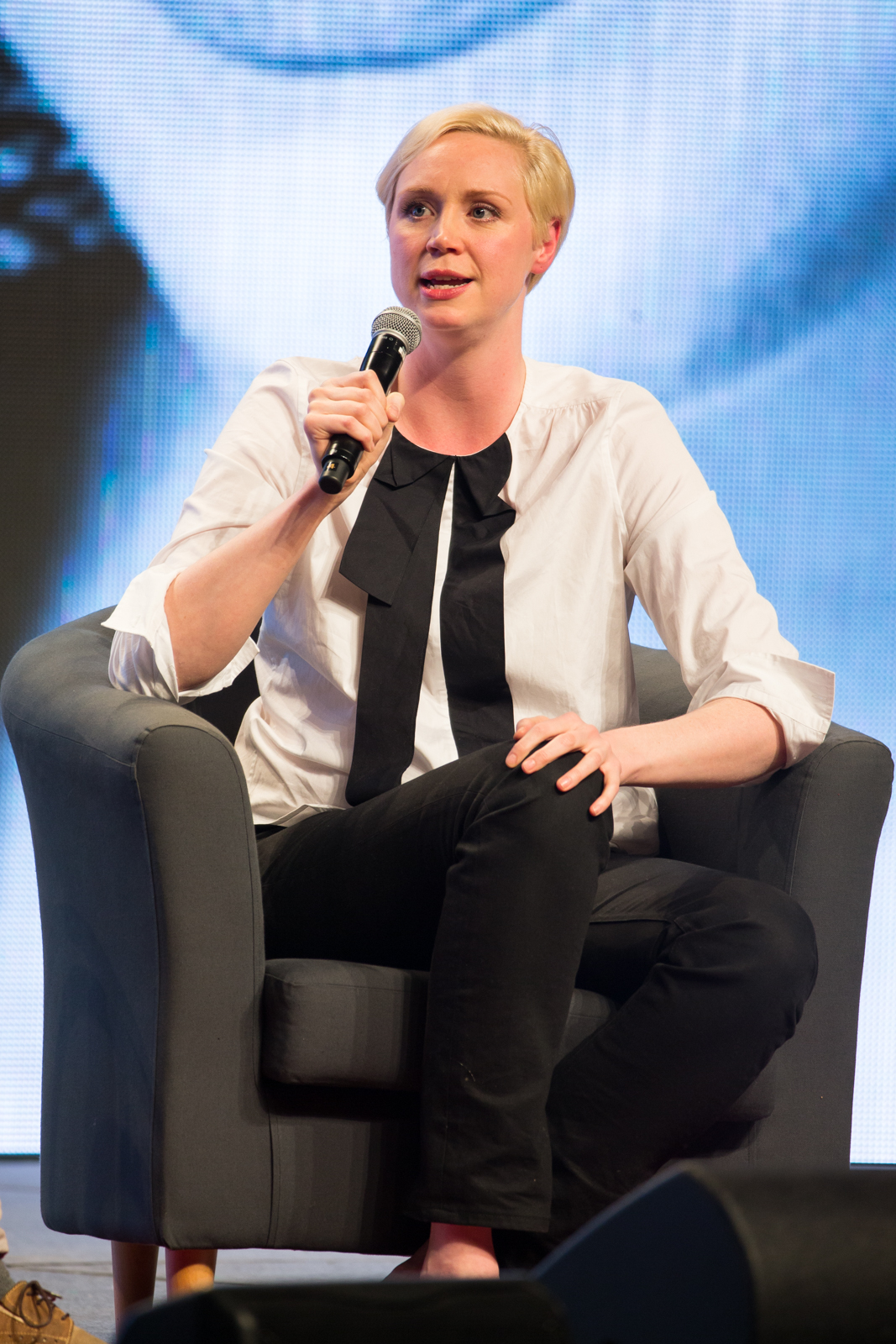
Gwendoline Christie at the Calgary Comic Expo in 2015

In 2017, Christie had a main role in China Girl, the second season of Top of the Lake, as Miranda Hilmarson, a Constable in the Sydney Police Force, and the new partner of the show's main character played by Elisabeth Moss; the character was written especially for Gwendoline by series co-creator Jane Campion, after Christie asked her to be a part of the series. The same year, she reprised her role of Captain Phasma in Star Wars: The Last Jedi, a sequel to The Force Awakens. She would later reprise the role for three episodes of the animated series Star Wars Resistance in 2018.

In 2018, she appeared as the bounty hunter Lady Jane in The Darkest Minds, an adaptation of the book trilogy The Darkest Minds by Alexandra Bracken, as Gwen in the Peter Strickland film In Fabric, and as the Russian caretaker Anna in the Robert Zemeckis film Welcome to Marwen.

Game of Thrones concluded in 2019 with its eighth season; for her performance in the final season, Christie received her first Primetime Emmy Award nomination for Outstanding Supporting Actress in a Drama Series, having submitted herself for the nomination; she also received a second Saturn Award for Best Supporting Actress on Television nomination for her performance in the final two seasons.

In January 2021, Christie was cast as Lucifer in the Netflix adaptation of The Sandman.

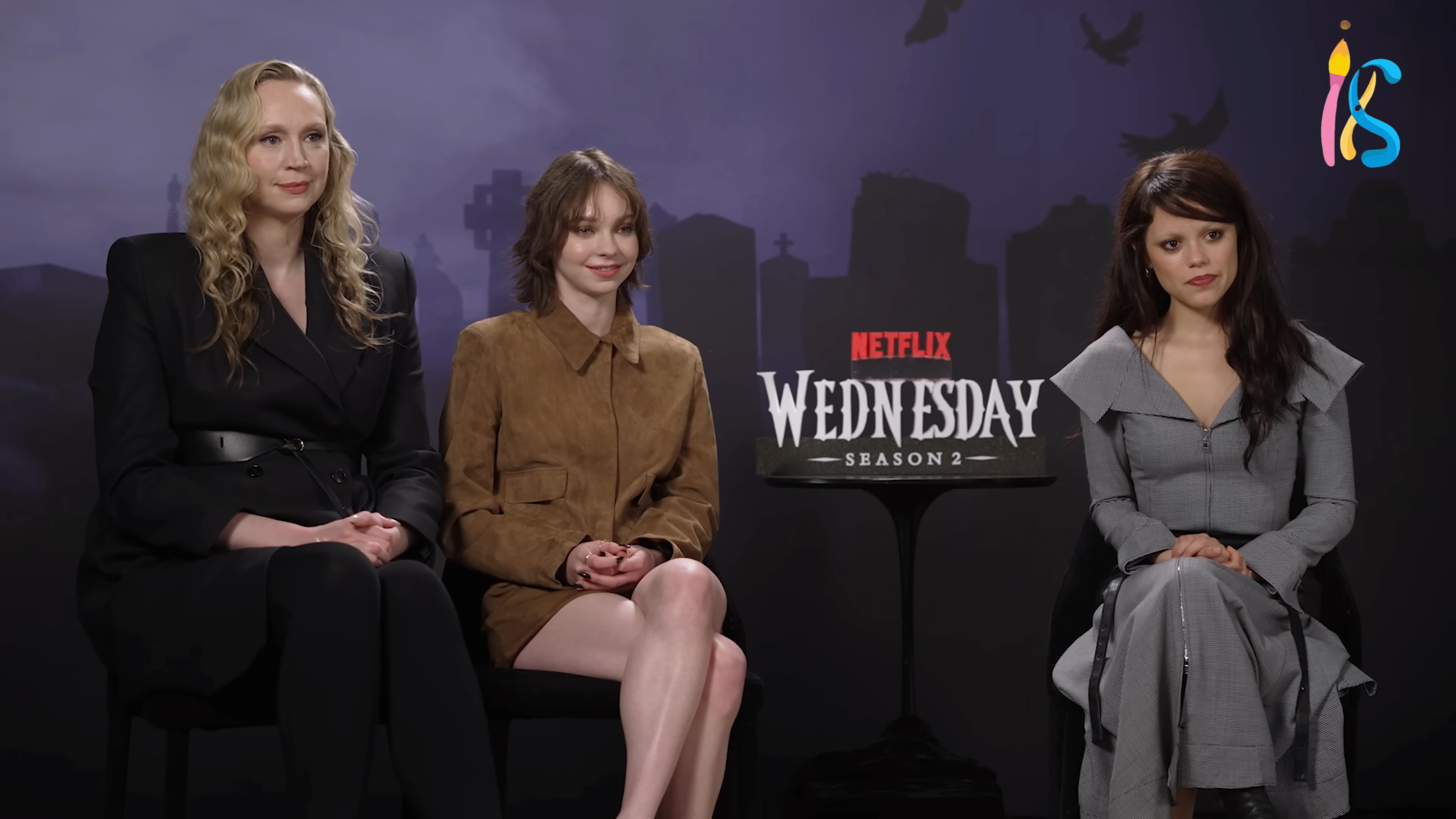
Christie with her Wednesday co-stars Emma Myers and Jenna Ortega in 2025

In November 2022, Christie played Principal Larissa Weems in the Netflix comedy horror series Wednesday.

In January 2024, Christie walked for Maison Margiela during Paris Couture Week, wearing the closing look of the collection. In May of the same year, Christie hosted the Vogue livestream coverage of the Met Gala, alongside La La Anthony, Ashley Graham and special correspondent Emma Chamberlain.

On 20 August 2024 Firaxis Games announced that Christie would be the narrator for their flagship game Civilization VII, which was later released in February 2025.

In October 2025, she featured on the track "The Good Life" by Sleaford Mods with Big Special.

== Personal life ==
Christie is 1.91 metres (6 ft 3 1/4 in) tall. Her height led to her being bullied when she was younger.

Since 2014, she has been in a relationship with British fashion designer Giles Deacon.

== Filmography ==
=== Feature films ===
Year	Title	Role	Notes
2009	The Imaginarium of Doctor Parnassus	Classy Shopper 2	
2013	The Zero Theorem	Woman in Commercial	
2015	The Hunger Games: Mockingjay – Part 2	Commander Lyme	
2015	Star Wars: The Force Awakens	Captain Phasma	
2016	Absolutely Fabulous: The Movie	Herself	
2017	Star Wars: The Last Jedi	Captain Phasma	
2018	The Darkest Minds	Lady Jane	
2018	In Fabric	Gwen	
2018	Welcome to Marwen	Anna	
2019	The Personal History of David Copperfield	Jane Murdstone	
2019	Our Friend	Teresa	
2022	Flux Gourmet	Jan Stevens	
2024	Robin and the Hoods	Aura	
2025	After This Death	Alice	

=== Television ===
Year	Title	Role	Notes
2010	Seven Ages of Britain Teaser	The Operator	Television film
2012–2013	Wizards vs Aliens	Lexi	Main role (seasons 1–2)
2012–2019	Game of Thrones	Brienne of Tarth	Recurring role (seasons 2–3); main (seasons 4–8)
2017	Top of the Lake: China Girl	Miranda Hilmarson	Miniseries
2018	Star Wars Resistance	Captain Phasma (voice)	3 episodes
2022	Green Eggs and Ham	Marilyn Blouse (voice)	Recurring role (season 2)
2022–present	Wednesday	Larissa Weems	Main role (season 1); recurring role (season 2)
2022–2025	The Sandman	Lucifer	5 episodes
2025	Severance	Lorne	Recurring role (season 2); 2 episodes

=== Theatre ===
Year	Title	Role	Notes
2006	Pravda	Cindy	Chichester Festival Theatre
2006	Mirandolina	Ortensia	Royal Exchange, Manchester
2007	Cymbeline	Queen	Barbican Theatre
2009	Giantbum	Sir Boss	London's Tate Britain
2009	Skin Deep	Susannah Dangerfield	Leeds Grand Theatre
2009	Breakfast at Tiffany's	Mag Wildwood	Theatre Royal Haymarket, London
2010	Dr. Faustus	Lucifer	Royal Exchange, Manchester
2019	A Midsummer Night's Dream	Titania/Hippolyta	Bridge Theatre

=== Video games ===
Year	Title	Voice role	Notes
2016	Lego Star Wars: The Force Awakens	Captain Phasma	
2017	Star Wars Battlefront II	Captain Phasma	
2025	Sid Meier's Civilization VII	Narrator	

=== Short films ===
Year	Title	Role	Director(s)	Notes
2007	The Time Surgeon	The Tape	Nathaniel Mellors	
2010	Ourhouse, Episode 1: 'Games'	Annalise "Babydoll" Wilson	Nathaniel Mellors	Also associate producer, and responsible for casting, costumes, props, and make-up
2010	Ourhouse, Episode 4: 'Internal Problems'	Annalise "Babydoll" Wilson	Nathaniel Mellors	Also associate producer, and responsible for casting, costumes, props, and make-up
2011	Ourhouse, Episode 2: 'Class'	Annalise "Babydoll" Wilson	Nathaniel Mellors	Also associate producer, and responsible for casting, costumes, props, and make-up
2011	Ourhouse, Episode 3: 'The Cure of Folly'	Annalise "Babydoll" Wilson	Nathaniel Mellors	Also associate producer, and responsible for casting
2016	The Dress	The Woman	Barnaby Roper	
2026	Confessions II	Herself	TORSO	

She also appeared in the music video for "Damaris" by Patrick Wolf in 2009.

=== Audio dramas ===
Year	Title	Role	Notes
2020	The Sleeper and the Spindle	The Queen	
2022	The Callisto Protocol: Helix Station	Percy	Prequel to the video game The Callisto Protocol

In 2025, she featured in the Sleaford Mods song The Good Life (also with Big Special).

== Awards and nominations ==
Year	Award	Category	Nominated work	Result
2013	Saturn Awards	Best Supporting Actress on Television	Game of Thrones	Nominated
2013	Screen Actors Guild Awards	Screen Actors Guild Award for Outstanding Performance by an Ensemble in a Drama Series	Game of Thrones	Nominated
2014	Screen Actors Guild Awards	Screen Actors Guild Award for Outstanding Performance by an Ensemble in a Drama Series	Game of Thrones	Nominated
2015	Screen Actors Guild Awards	Screen Actors Guild Award for Outstanding Performance by an Ensemble in a Drama Series	Game of Thrones	Nominated
2015	Empire Awards	Hero Award	Game of Thrones	Won
2018	Screen Actors Guild Awards	Outstanding Performance by an Ensemble in a Drama Series	Game of Thrones	Nominated
2019	Saturn Awards	Best Supporting Actress on Television	Game of Thrones	Nominated
2019	Primetime Emmy Awards	Outstanding Supporting Actress in a Drama Series	Game of Thrones	Nominated
2020	Critics' Choice Television Awards	Best Supporting Actress in a Drama Series	Game of Thrones	Nominated
2020	Screen Actors Guild Awards	Screen Actors Guild Award for Outstanding Performance by an Ensemble in a Drama Series	Game of Thrones	Nominated
2022	British Independent Film Awards	Best Ensemble Performance	Flux Gourmet	Nominated
2024	Astra Creative Arts TV Awards	Best Guest Actress in a Drama Series	The Sandman	Nominated
2025	Primetime Emmy Awards	Outstanding Guest Actress in a Drama Series	Severance	Nominated
2025	Astra Awards	Best Guest Actress in a Drama Series	Severance	Nominated
