= Eugenia Caruso =

Italian British actress and screenwriter

Eugenia Caruso is an Italian and British actress and screenwriter.

== Early life ==
Caruso was born in Rome and completed her studies in the United Kingdom at East 15 Acting School.

== Career ==
Caruso played the character of Mrs Santorelli in the television series adaptation of The Alienist. She also appeared in the comedy series Avenue 5.

Caruso appeared in the 2020 film The Witches, an adaptation of Roald Dahl's book of the same name, as well as the 2024 animated film The Garfield Movie.

== Filmography ==
Actress

- 2006 : The Silver Rope (short film) : Anne
- 2006 : Nati ieri (Italian TV series) : Puerpera
- 2008 : I demoni di San Pietroburgo : Lab Student
- 2011 : Fleeting Visit (court métrage)
- 2012 : Berberian Sound Studio : Claudia
- 2012 : Il filo d'Arianna (short film) : Sara
- 2014 : The Duke of Burgundy : Dr. Fraxini / screaming voice
- 2015 : Youth : Puritan Woman
- 2015 : Soap (short film) : Sophia
- 2015 : Chasing Robert Barker : Nadia
- 2016 : Country of Hotels : Louisa / Beverly
- 2016 : Checkmate (short film): Fate; also screenwriter- directed by Jason Bradbury; with Ornella Muti as Penury, Siân Phillips as Prosperity, Susanna Cappellaro as Irina and Lachlan Nieboer as Dimitri-
- 2016 : Eclair : Anna
- 2018 : The Alienist : Mrs Santorelli
- 2020 : Avenue 5 (TV series) (Episodes: "This Is Physically Hurting Me"; "I Was Flying") : Verity
- 2020 : The Witches
- 2024 : The Garfield Movie : Maria (voice)
- 2025 : Wednesday : Louise

== Radio ==
- 2014 : Road to Venice (BBC4)
- 2015: The Stone Tape (BBC R4)
- 2015: The Len Continuum (BBC4)

== Performances ==
- 2017, Stage, Natalie Stampanatto, The Verdict Middleground Theatre Company, Michael Lunney
- 2016, Stage, Nurse, Redefining Juliet, Barbican, Rae McKen
- 2011–2014, Stage, Various, HURRIED STEPS, New Shoes at THE FINBOROUGHand TOUR NICOLETTE KAY
- 2007, Stage, Katalijne, Truckstop, Eastern Angles and Company of Angels, Unicorn, Hampstead Theatre, Christopher Rolls

== Awards and nominations ==
Won Best actress award jointly with Janet Bamford at The Stage Awards for Acting Excellence 2007
