= Native (film) =

2016 film

Native is a 2016 British sci-fi film directed by Daniel Fitzsimmons, written by Fitzsimmons and Neil Atkinson. It stars Rupert Graves and Ellie Kendrick.

== Plot ==
Two sets of mixed fraternal twins, Cane and Awan as well as Eva and Seth, are on an unnamed planet on which people are connected in "hive' minds via devices implanted in the backs of their necks, and on which the culture is highly logical and utilitarian. Because they have a high degree of telepathic rapport, they are chosen for a colonization mission to Earth, after a space probe transmits Beethoven's Fifth—which they recognize as evidence of intelligent life but whose purpose they don't clearly understand, as there apparently is no music for artistic purposes on their planet. Authorities choose Cane and Eva as the astronauts, and Awan and Seth as their contacts at Mission Control—that is to say, each astronaut's sole means of communication with their home planet is contact with their twin. Authorities add that there is a live virus aboard ship as well.

Cane is already fascinated by the music, to an extent Eva already finds disturbing. After Awan becomes pregnant, only to die along with the fetuses she was carrying, Cane starts displaying behavior much like conventional human beings—for instance, he starts trying to get to know Eva better personally, and he uses garbage and broken glass to make a pendant for himself and a drawing for Eva. Eventually, he becomes distraught enough to attempt suicide by hanging, though Eva saves his life. He also tries to initiate physical contact with Eva, despite her objections.

As the ship approaches Earth, Eva receives instructions from Mission Control, via Seth, to land in a body of water near a city, and to release a live virus to render the human race extinct to prepare for colonization by the home world. Cane uses a shard of broken glass to cut the telepathic receiver out of his neck, enters a room with what appear to be fetuses in artificial wombs but may be their "virus", and attempts to shut down the virus program before Eva knocks him out and places him in a stasis chamber.

Because the virus needs to be exposed to human DNA before it is released, Eva goes to extract some. She approaches a woman who fights her off. Eva fatally stabs the woman, then takes her DNA. Eva is distraught, despite Seth's continued pushing to continue the mission. Eve wakes Cane and tells him what she did; he reminds her that she's planning to do the same thing to all other human beings.

Eva and Cane return to the room with the fetuses, and Eva tries telling Cane and herself that human beings aren't as valuable as their people, for instance because there are no "hive minds" on Earth. Then Cane plays Beethoven's Fifth again and Eva collapses; telepathic pressure from Seth continues. She asks Cane for help, and when he returns with a glass shard, she cuts the telepathic receiver out of her neck.

Cane and Eva agree to "contain the virus" on the ship and as an alarm sounds, they leave the ship, presumably for the last time. The movies ends when they are cut off permanently from their home world and unable to speak the language. They admit to each other how scared they are as they consider what they will do next.

== Cast ==
- Rupert Graves as Cane
- Ellie Kendrick as Eva
- Leanne Best as Awan
- Joe Macauley as Seth
- Pollyanna McIntosh as Matilda
- Daniel Brocklebank as Delin
- Chiara D'Anna as The Target
- Ian Hart as Telepathic voice
- John Fitzsimmons as Listener

== Reviews ==
Native has a 43% rating on Rotten Tomatoes based on 7 reviews, with an average rating of 5.1/10.

The film is described as being "smart" and "elegant" by Peter Bradshaw in the Guardian. Kim Newman in Empire magazine says it is "ambitious, unusual, and thought-provoking". In The Times Ed Potton calls it a “script full of promise, with provocative things to say about empathy, obedience, and individualism”.

== Production ==
It was shot predominantly in Dagenham and Formby Beach in Liverpool in 2014. The co-writer and co-producer Atkinson said in an interview with the Liverpool Echo: “Everyone at Formby Beach was helpful. Dogwalkers gave us a wide berth but the problem was the tide–we had a ticking clock and finished filming with the water up to our director of photography’s knees.”

== Awards ==
The film won the feature film award at the 2016 Boston Science Fiction Film Festival. It was nominated for best film and director at the 2016 Bogotá Film Festival.
