= Chiara D'Anna =

Italian actress

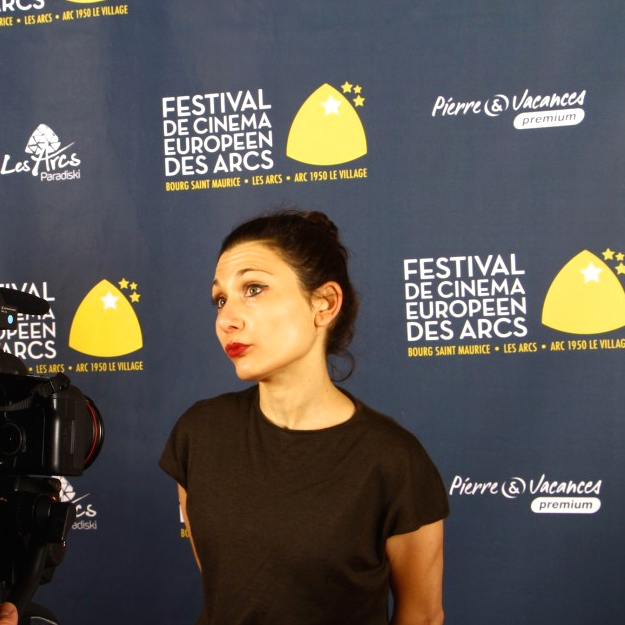
- D'Anna at LesArcs Film Festival.
- Born: Turin, Italy
- Education: Royal Holloway University
- Occupations: Actress, Director, Lecturer, Movement Coach
- Years active: 2002–present
- Awards: Inspiring Woman in a Film Los Angeles Film Awards
- Website: www.chiaradanna.com

Chiara D'Anna is an Italian actress, director, writer and academic notable for working with the writer and director Peter Strickland in Berberian Sound Studio and The Duke of Burgundy. While studying geology at the University of Turin she joined drama school. Her directorial debut was an adaptation of Bulghakov's The Master and Margarita. The following year her adaptation of Oscar Wilde's Salome was awarded the Aquilegia Blu National Prize. After obtaining her MSc degree she left Italy to pursue her acting career in London.

== Life and work ==
D'Anna was born near Turin, Italy. She studied Geology and spent most of her early twenties between the Alps and the Himalayas. She trained in Italy, Poland and the UK and holds a BSc and MSc in geology from the University of Turin, an MA in physical theatre from the Royal Holloway University and a PhD in performing arts from the School of Art, Architecture and Design at London Metropolitan University. At the completion of her MA in physical theatre at Royal Holloway University she started lecturing at Rose Bruford College and working as a freelance movement and acting coach.

In 2010 she founded Panta Rei Theatre. The company's vision is to 'inspire open mindedness and compassion by engaging the audience on a physical, emotional, intellectual and spiritual level.' Her productions have been praised for their originality, creativity and outstanding visual power. Her wide-ranging body of work includes text-based theatre, multimedia performances, site-specific immersive work, happenings, dance theatre, street theatre, performance-installations, combined arts events and Commedia dell'Arte shows.

Her film career began in 2011 with her debut in Peter Strickland award-winning Berberian Sound Studio. A couple of year later Strickland cast her as co-lead opposite Sidse Babett Knudsen in The Duke of Burgundy. This performance brought D'Anna to the attention of many critics worldwide. At the Toronto International Film Festival D'Anna was nominated as one of the 13 Actors to Watch Out For. Since then she has appeared in several features and short films including Native, The Rook and Stars and Bones for which she was awarded the "Inspiring Woman in A Film" at the Los Angeles Film Awards, April 2017.

Between 2014 and 2018 she led a practice-led research project on the legacy of Commedia dell'Arte in postdramatic theatre at the School of Art, Architecture and Design. D'Anna still maintains strong links with academia and education. She teaches movement on the MA Theatre Lab at RADA and works as an associate lecturer at Rose Bruford College, East15 Acting School, Goldsmiths University in the UK and the Accademia dell'Arte in Arezzo, Italy.

D'Anna lives in north London with her partner therapist, education consultant and author Michael Warwick with whom she founded Natural You, "an holistic and transformative practice exploring the connection between Body, Mind and Spirit. It draws on Yoga, Dance, Physical Theatre and self-development work".

== Filmography ==
Actress

- 2012 : Berberian Sound Studio
- 2014 : The Duke of Burgundy
- 2015 : The Rook (short film)
- 2016 : Native
- 2016 : Circe and the Boy (short film)
- 2017 : Stars and Bones (short film)
