= The Callisto Protocol: Helix Station =

Podcast prequel to The Callisto Protocol

The Callisto Protocol: Helix Station is a podcast set in the same world as the video game of the same name.

== Background ==
The podcast is the prologue to the video game The Callisto Protocol. The show was produced by Krafton, Striking Distance, and IGN. The show debuted with its first two episodes on November 3, 2022 and then released episodes weekly each Friday until December 1, 2022. The show is composed of six episodes. The show is available on Striking Distance's YouTube channel.

The show was directed by Willie Block and Jake Emanuel. The show stars Gwendoline Christie and Michael Ironside as the protagonists Percy and Kane. Percy is a "skip tracer" that is tracking down an escaped prisoner that has fled to Helix Station.

== Reception ==
In Game Rant, Richard Warren wrote that the show "is not getting nearly as much praise as it should" and speculated on the potential for similar shows.

=== Awards ===
Award	Date	Recipient	Category	Result	Ref.
Brand Entertainment Awards	2023	The Callisto Protocol: Helix Station	Podcasts	Honoree	
Webby Awards	2023	The Callisto Protocol: Helix Station	People's Voice Winner for Scripted (Fiction) Podcasts	Won	
Webby Awards	2023	The Callisto Protocol: Helix Station	Limited Series and Specials for Scripted (Fiction) Podcasts	Honoree	
Signal Awards	2023	The Callisto Protocol: Helix Station	Limited Series and Specials for Scripted (Fiction) Podcasts	Listener's Choice	
Signal Awards	2023	The Callisto Protocol: Helix Station	Limited Series and Specials for Scripted (Fiction) Podcasts	Bronze	
Signal Awards	2023	Episode 2, "Shipwrecks"	Individual Episodes for Scripted (Fiction) Podcasts	Silver	
