= Flux Gourmet =

- Theatrical release poster
- Directed by: Peter Strickland
- Written by: Peter Strickland
- Produced by: Serena Armitage; Pietro Greppi
- Starring: Asa Butterfield; Gwendoline Christie; Ariane Labed; Fatma Mohamed; Makis Papadimitriou; Richard Bremmer; Leo Bill
- Cinematography: Tim Sidell
- Edited by: Mátyás Fekete
- Production companies: Bankside Films; Blue Bear Film & TV; Head Gear Films; Metrol Technology; Lunapark Pictures; Red Breast Productions
- Distributed by: Curzon Film (United Kingdom and Ireland); IFC Films (United States and Canada)
- Release date: February 11, 2022 (Berlin)
- Running time: 111 minutes
- Countries: United Kingdom; United States
- Languages: English; Greek; German
- Box office: $80,767

Flux Gourmet is a 2022 black comedy art film written and directed by Peter Strickland and starring Fatma Mohamed, Gwendoline Christie, Makis Papadimitriou, Ariane Labed, and Asa Butterfield.

== Synopsis ==
A trio of experimental performance artists led by a narcissistic, controlling woman named Elle di Elle, takes up residency at a remote artistic institution, run by a wealthy, enigmatic director named Jan Stevens, who is funding the project. A self-described "hack" journalist named Stones is hired to document the day-to-day activities of the group involving their process of "sonic catering" (where they extract disturbing ASMR made by the sounds from various foods) while dealing with unpleasant gastrointestinal disorders, for which tests are being administered by an on-site doctor. As Stones documents the artistic collective's power struggles, vendettas, rehearsals, performances, and sordid history, he increasingly becomes a participant in the artistic proceedings.

== Cast ==
- Asa Butterfield as Billy Rubin
- Gwendoline Christie as Jan Stevens
- Ariane Labed as Lamina Propria
- Fatma Mohamed as Elle di Elle
- Makis Papadimitriou as Stones
- Leo Bill as Technical Assistant Wim
- Richard Bremmer as Dr Glock

== Production ==
Filming wrapped in July 2021.

== Release ==
In July 2021, it was announced that IFC Films acquired North American distribution rights to the film. It premiered at the Berlin Film Festival on February 11, 2022. It also made it to 'World Cinema' section of 27th Busan International Film Festival to be screened in October 2022.

== Reception ==
=== Box office ===
In the United States and Canada, the film earned $3,780 from 19 theaters in its opening weekend. It made $1,397 from six theaters the following weekend, and $4,387 in its third.

=== Critical response ===
The film has an 85% approval rating on Rotten Tomatoes based on 80 reviews, with a weighted average of 7.1/10. The site's consensus states, "Flux Gourmet isn't for all tastes, but viewers attuned to writer-director Peter Strickland's unique wavelength will find this horror-laced satire a savory delight". Metacritic, which uses a weighted average, assigned the film a score of 79 out of 100, based on 26 critics, indicating "generally favorable" reviews.

Pat Brown of Slant Magazine awarded the film two and a half stars out of four and wrote, "That being said, Strickland's playful mockery of performance art and excessively serious-minded "collectives" feels both insular and, at times, a shade too flavorless." David Ehrlich of IndieWire graded the film a B+ and wrote, "As usual, Strickland has made a sumptuous meal out of social impropriety — a strange cinematic delicacy about the discomforts that need to be shared so that others don't have to be stomached." Matthew Joseph Jenner of the International Cinephile Society awarded the film four and a half out of five stars, writing "Flux Gourmet is an absolute triumph, best enjoyed by those who accept that Strickland's work is undeniably an acquired taste, but one that offers a truly unforgettable experience, one that may even tempt us to go back for a second serving."

Peter Debruge of Variety gave the film a negative review and wrote, "In fact, Flux Gourmet may well send audiences running for the loo, or else reaching for the barf bag, coming about as close to triggering the gag reflex as a film can without actually jamming a finger down your throat." Leslie Felperin of The Hollywood Reporter gave the film a positive review and wrote, "Nevertheless, Strickland builds his own worlds with such a distinctive style — down to the fonts, the bilious shades of green and the textures of the silks — that the viewer can't help feeling pulled into his crazy maelstrom of quirk." Peter Bradshaw of The Guardian awarded the film three stars out of five and wrote, "Flux Gourmet may yet have a claim to cult-favourite status, but Strickland has given us a stronger, realer taste in the past." Anna Smith of Deadline Hollywood gave the film a positive review and wrote, "Strickland has delivered another delicious character-driven drama that balances the amusingly surreal with the uncomfortably real — and it's a wild and witty ride."
