= In Fabric =

2018 film by Peter Strickland

- Theatrical release poster
- Directed by: Peter Strickland
- Written by: Peter Strickland
- Produced by: Andy Starke
- Starring: Marianne Jean-Baptiste; Hayley Squires; Leo Bill; Julian Barratt; Steve Oram; Gwendoline Christie; Barry Adamson; Jaygann Ayeh; Richard Bremmer; Terry Bird; Fatma Mohamed
- Cinematography: Ari Wegner
- Edited by: Matyas Fekete
- Music by: Cavern of Anti-Matter
- Production companies: Rook Films; BFI; BBC Films; Headgear Films; Metrol Technology; Twickenham Studios
- Distributed by: Curzon
- Release dates: 18 September 2018 (TIFF); 28 June 2019 (United Kingdom)
- Running time: 118 minutes
- Country: United Kingdom
- Language: English

In Fabric is a 2018 British absurdist horror film written and directed by Peter Strickland, and starring Marianne Jean-Baptiste, Hayley Squires, Leo Bill and Gwendoline Christie. The film follows a haunted red dress as it torments various owners.

It had its world premiere at the Toronto International Film Festival on 13 September 2018. It was released in the United Kingdom on 28 June 2019 by Curzon and in the United States on 6 December 2019 by A24. The film received acclaim from critics for its direction, humour, atmosphere, and its homages to Italian giallo films; however, audiences were divided on its absurdity and slow pacing.

== Plot ==
Recently divorced bank teller Sheila is frequently chastised for small work errors by her bosses. She is intimidated by Gwen, her son Vince's girlfriend. After learning about her ex-husband's new girlfriend and seeing Vince performing oral sex on Gwen, she visits the department store Dentley & Soper's during their sales to buy a dress for a date.

Assisted by enigmatic store clerk Miss Luckmoore, Sheila buys a beautiful, flowing red dress. After wearing the dress, Sheila notices a strange rash on her chest. Her washing machine later breaks down with the dress inside, and Sheila injures her hand retrieving it. At night, the store clerks are shown cleaning a lifelike mannequin, which appears to menstruate, as the elderly proprietor Mr Lundy observes and masturbates.

Returning to the store, Sheila learns that the dress is one of a kind, and the store model who wore it for the catalogue was later killed. Sheila goes on a date with her new suitor Zach while Gwen and Vince have sex. As Gwen climaxes, the dress floats above her and tries to suffocate her. When Sheila and Zach go for a walk, a German Shepherd attacks her, injuring her leg and ripping the dress, which later appears mysteriously unharmed. At night, Sheila hears the dress move about in the wardrobe.

Unsettled, Sheila attempts to return the dress to the store but is refused. She recounts a dream to her bosses at work about seeing her mother reflected in the mirror. With the dress in her car trunk, she drives to another date with Zach. Distracted by two mannequins standing on the road, Sheila gets into an accident and is killed.

The dress comes into the possession of washing machine repairman Reg Speaks. A socially awkward man with the uncanny ability to put people into a trance by explaining the mechanics of a washing machine, he struggles to have sex with his fiancée Babs.

After being made to wear the dress on his stag night, he has a disturbing dream of being shut out of the delivery room as Babs gives birth to a baby who emerges wearing the dress. Babs wears the dress to shop at Dentley & Soper's. Luckmoore rebukes Babs for shopping near closing time, but is convinced by Lundy to let her stay. Meanwhile, Reg is hypnotised by the department store's TV advertisement and dies from carbon monoxide poisoning caused by his boiler.

Babs recounts a disturbing dream to Luckmoore in which she becomes the model for the store catalogue but gets thinner and thinner until she ends up being buried in the store. Babs goes into the fitting room while a fight between patrons breaks out, which quickly spirals into looting. The dress falls onto a heater and catches fire, and the flames spread quickly through the store. Babs burns to death in the changing room.

Luckmoore flees into the dumbwaiter with a dismembered mannequin. As she descends deeper into the store, she looks on in ecstasy as she passes the dead catalogue model, Sheila, Reg, and Babs stitching together the dress from threads made of their blood, along with several empty sewing stations implied to be for future wearers.

A fireman observes the destroyed store and discovers the dress undamaged amongst the rubble.

== Cast ==
- Marianne Jean-Baptiste as Sheila Woolchapel
- Hayley Squires as Babs
- Leo Bill as Reg Speaks
- Julian Barratt as Stash
- Steve Oram as Clive
- Gwendoline Christie as Gwen
- Barry Adamson as Zach
- Jaygann Ayeh as Vince
- Richard Bremmer as Mr Lundy
- Terry Bird as Bananas Brian
- Fatma Mohamed as Miss Luckmoore
- Sidse Babett Knudsen as Jill

== Production ==
In September 2017, it was announced that Marianne Jean-Baptiste had joined the cast of the film, with Peter Strickland directing from a screenplay he wrote. Andy Starke served as a producer on the film, and Ian Benson, Lizzie Francke, Rose Garnett, Stephen Kelliher, Patrick Howson, Phil Hunt and Compton Ross served as executive producers on the film under their Blue Bear Rook Films, Bankside Films, BBC Films and British Film Institute banners, respectively. In November 2017, Hayley Squires, Julian Barratt, Gwendoline Christie, Leo Bill, Steve Oram, Fatma Mohamed, Jaygann Ayeh and Richard Bremmer joined the cast of the film.

Strickland commented that when writing the script he drew inspiration from both the curious nature of second-hand shops and his memories of being taken to department stores as a child, in particular the now-closed Jacksons head branch in Reading, Berkshire. He wanted to interrogate the reactions people have to clothing. The dress itself was therefore very important. It also needed to fit a range of body types, so costume designer Jo Thompson made a simple red silk wrap dress.

== Release ==
In March 2018, Curzon Artificial Eye acquired UK distribution rights to the film. The film had its world premiere at the Toronto International Film Festival on 13 September 2018. Shortly afterwards, A24 acquired US distribution rights to the film. It was released in the United Kingdom on 28 June 2019 and in the United States on 6 December 2019.

=== Critical response ===
In Fabric was acclaimed by film critics. On the review aggregator website Rotten Tomatoes, the film holds an approval rating of 91% based on 160 reviews, with an average rating of 7.4/10. The website's critics consensus reads, "In Fabric's gauzy giallo allure weaves a surreal spell, blending stylish horror and dark comedy to offer audiences a captivating treat." Metacritic, which uses a weighted average, assigned the film a score of 81 out of 100, based on 29 critics, indicating "universal acclaim".

Upon its UK release, The Independent called the film "Suspiria set in a department store" and commented that it was Strickland at "his most free and playful". The Daily Telegraph called him "modern Britain's answer to Luis Buñuel." Empire enjoyed the "dry, daft wit that reveals itself in surprising ways, from the bonkers premise onwards". Writing in The Guardian, Mark Kermode made it his film of the week and praised the "heady mix of intoxicating nostalgia, clothing-related alchemy and horror-inflected twisted comedy".

Internationally, critics also lauded the film. The New York Times stated it was Strickland's "most impressive, engrossing, imaginatively unchained work yet". Rolling Stone summed up the film as "a singular trip into a singularly warped mind".

In Fabric was included in best of 2019 film lists in The Playlist and Sight & Sound.

=== Home media ===
Artificial Eye released the film on Blu-ray in the United Kingdom on 26 August 2019. Lionsgate released a BD-R edition in the United States.
