= The Duke of Burgundy =

- British release poster
- Directed by: Peter Strickland
- Written by: Peter Strickland
- Produced by: Andy Starke
- Starring: Sidse Babett Knudsen; Chiara D'Anna; Eugenia Caruso; Zita Kraszkó; Monica Swinn; Eszter Tompa; Fatma Mohamed
- Cinematography: Nic Knowland
- Edited by: Mátyás Fekete
- Music by: Cat's Eyes
- Production companies: Film4 Productions; Ripken Productions; Rook Films
- Distributed by: Artificial Eye
- Release dates: 6 September 2014 (TIFF); 20 February 2015 (UK)
- Running time: 104 minutes
- Country: United Kingdom
- Language: English
- Box office: $175,668

The Duke of Burgundy is a 2014 British erotic romance drama film written and directed by Peter Strickland, and starring Sidse Babett Knudsen as Cynthia and Chiara D'Anna as Evelyn.

The film was screened at various film festivals, including the Toronto International Film Festival, the BFI London Film Festival, and the International Film Festival Rotterdam, to positive critical reviews. According to Strickland, the film was influenced by Spanish filmmaker Jesús Franco, including with the casting of Monica Swinn, who had worked with Franco previously. This was Swinn's first film role in over 30 years (she had previously retired in 1982).

== Plot ==
Evelyn is studying lepidopterology under the older Cynthia, who frequently lectures on her studies. Evelyn is romantically involved with Cynthia and works as a maid in her home, where she is subject to strict behavioral expectations and high standards of cleanliness. When Evelyn does not complete tasks to Cynthia's satisfaction, she is punished.

As Cynthia increasingly falters in her dominance, it becomes apparent that Evelyn is orchestrating Cynthia's role in the relationship by writing instructions and scripts for specific play scenes, which the couple acts out in the same way each day. While Evelyn finds the scenes to be sexually exciting, Cynthia only acts them out to sate her lover. She attempts to please Evelyn for her birthday by ordering a carpenter to construct a bed with a drawer underneath for Evelyn to sleep in as a punishment; however, Evelyn is unhappy with the length of time it will take to produce the bed, and ultimately refuses the gift.

Evelyn begins to demand that Cynthia lock her in a trunk in the evening as a new punishment. Cynthia agrees, but she is resentful about the new physical separation. Cynthia also becomes self-conscious about her ageing, having injured her back moving the trunk to her bedside. The couple's relationship becomes more strained as Evelyn's expectations go unfulfilled. Later, Cynthia accuses Evelyn of polishing another lecturer's boots, which she considers to be an act of betrayal. She expresses her unhappiness on Evelyn's birthday, when she demands that Evelyn bake her own birthday cake, which Cynthia eats while reclining with her feet resting on Evelyn's face. Evelyn does not enjoy the scene and calls out her safeword, pinastri, which Cynthia ignores.

The two begin to act out the same play scene as before, but then Cynthia breaks character and starts to cry. Evelyn consoles her, expressing her love. Later, Evelyn's instructions are shown being burned and the two carry out the trunk Evelyn would lie in as punishment. The film ends with Evelyn standing in-front of the house ringing the doorbell, repeating the cycle once more.

== Cast ==
- Sidse Babett Knudsen as Cynthia
- Chiara D'Anna as Evelyn
- Monica Swinn as Lorna
- Eugenia Caruso as Dr. Fraxini
- Fatma Mohamed as The Carpenter
- Kata Bartsch as Dr. Lurida
- Eszter Tompa as Dr. Viridana
- Zita Kraszkó as Dr. Schuller

== Title ==
As lepidopterology (the study of moths and butterflies) is a theme throughout the film, the title refers to the Duke of Burgundy (Hamearis lucina) butterfly, although it is no longer known "how [it] received that name in the first place, any reasoning being lost in the mists of entomological antiquity."

== Reception ==
The film received overwhelmingly positive reviews from critics. Review aggregator website Rotten Tomatoes reported an approval rating of 94%, based on 101 reviews, with an average rating of 8 out of 10. The critical consensus reads "Stylish, sensual, and smart, The Duke of Burgundy proves that erotic cinema can have genuine substance". At Metacritic, which assigns a weighted average score, the film has a score of 87 out of 100, indicating "Universal Acclaim" based on 24 reviews.

The A.V. Club called The Duke of Burgundy the 4th best film of 2015 and the 34th best film of the 2010s. The IndieWire critic's poll named it the third best film of the year, and it ranked 69th in that publication's list of the best films of the decade.

The film's score by Cat's Eyes also received positive attention.

=== Awards and accolades ===
Strickland received the Wouter Barendrecht Pioneering Vision Award at the Hamptons International Film Festival for his work on the film. The film also won the Grand Jury Prize at the 23rd Philadelphia Film Festival.

== Soundtrack ==
The Duke of Burgundy soundtrack was released by Cat's Eyes in February 2015.
