= Hervé Bazin =

French writer (1911-1996)

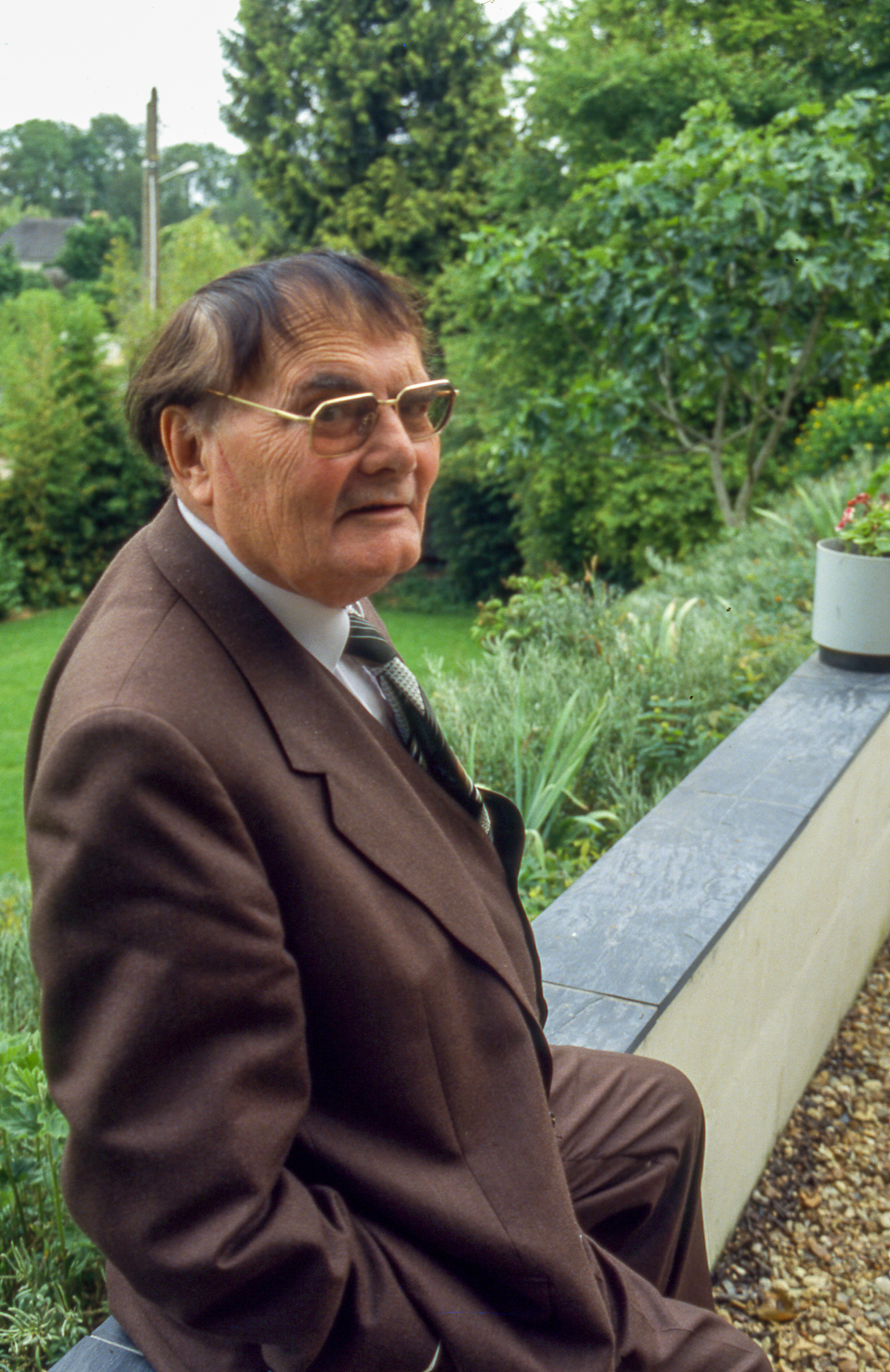
- Hervé Bazin in 1993.
- Born: 17 April 1911; Angers, France
- Died: 17 February 1996 (aged 84); Angers, France
- Education: University of Paris
- Occupation: writer

Hervé Bazin (French: [bazɛ̃]; 17 April 1911 – 17 February 1996) was a French writer, whose best-known novels covered semi-autobiographical topics of teenage rebellion and dysfunctional families.

== Biography ==
Bazin, born Jean-Pierre Hervé-Bazin in Angers, Maine-et-Loire, France came from a high-bourgeois Catholic family. He was the great-nephew of the writer René Bazin. His father was a magistrate who with his wife had been sent to China to take up a diplomatic post. Hervé and his brother were brought up in the ancestral home, the chateau of Le Patys, by their grandmother. When she died, his mother returned from Hanoi with reluctance. She sent Bazin to a variety of clerical establishments and then to the military academy, the Prytanée de la Fleche, from which he was expelled as incompetent. He opposed his authoritarian mother, ran away several times during his teens, and refused Catholic teachings. At the age of 20 he broke up with his family.

Leaving his home for Paris, he took a degree in literature at the Sorbonne. During fifteen years of writing poetry with little success, Bazin worked in many small jobs. Notable work of this period included founding a poetic review, la Coquille (The Shell, only eight volumes), named after the medieval poet-beggars, the coquillards of Villon's days, and "À la poursuite d'Iris" in 1948. He won the 1947 Prix Apollinaire for Jour, his first book of poetry.

Following the advice of Paul Valéry, he left poetry to focus on prose.

Childhood conflicts with his mother inspired the novel Viper in the Fist in 1948. The novel portrays the hatred between a mother nicknamed Folcoche (from the French "folle" (crazy) and "cochonne" (pig) and her children, including the narrator Jean Rezeau, called "Brasse-bouillon". The book was immensely successful in postwar France, and was followed by La Mort du Petit Cheval and Le Cri de la Chouette to create a trilogy. In other works, Bazin returned to the theme of the family. In addition to novels, he also wrote short stories and essays.

Bazin became a member of the Académie Goncourt in 1958, replacing Francis Carco. He became its president in 1973, and was replaced, after his death, by Jorge Semprún, while the presidency was given to François Nourissier.

Politically, Bazin belonged to the Mouvement de la Paix, in relation with the communist party of which he was a sympathizer. He obtained the Lenin Peace Prize in 1979. This made Roger Peyrefitte say jokingly: "Hervé Bazin had two prizes which fitted each other: the Lenin Peace Prize and the black humour prize."

In 1995, he gave his manuscripts and letters to the record office of the town of Nancy, which already owned the archives of the Goncourt brothers, who originated from the town. Bazin died in Angers.

Due to a juridical imbroglio, the six children of his first marriages obtained, against the will of his last spouse and last son, the auction of the archive at the Hôtel Drouot on 29 October 2004. With help from the district's authorities, the university library of Angers managed to preempt almost the whole of the estate, meaning 22 manuscripts and about 9000 letters which were made available to the research community, as the author wished.

== Orthography and punctuation ==
In his 1966 essay Plumons l’Oiseau ("Let's pluck the bird"): Bazin proposed a nearly phonemic orthography for the French language called "l’ortografiǝ lojikǝ" (logical orthography).

Letter	Name	Name (IPA)	Note
a	a (wvèr)	/a~ɑ/ (/u.vèʁ/)	
(á)	a fèrmé	/a~ɑ/ /fɛʁ.me/	optional
e	e	/ə/	
é	é	/e/	
è	è	/ɛ/	
œ	œ (wvèr)	/œ~ø/ (/u.vèʁ/)	
(œ́)	œ fèrmé	/œ~ø/ /fɛʁ.me/	optional
o	ɔ (wvèr)	/ɔ/ (/u.vèʁ/)	
ó	ó (fèrmé)	/o/ (/fɛʁ.me/)	required
i	i	/i/	
u	u	/y/	
w	w	/u/	ou vowel
ã	ã	/ɑ̃/	
ẽ	ẽ	/ɛ̃/	
õ	õ	/ɔ̃/	
œ̃	œ̃	/œ̃/	
b	bé	/be/	
k	ké	/ke/	
d	dé	/de/	
f	fé	/fe/	
g	gé	/ge/	always hard
h	hé	/ʃe/	soft ch
j	jé	/ʒe/	
l	lé	/le/	
m	mé	/me/	
n	né	/ne/	
ñ	ñé	/ɲ/, /ŋ/	
p	pé	/pe/	
r	ré	/ʁe/	
s	sé	/se/	never voiced
t	té	/te/	
v	vé	/ve/	
z	zé	/ze/	
y	yé	/je/	
u͐	u͐e	/ɥe/	
w͐	w͐e	/we/	
ɔ	le siñə dur	/lə siɲ dyʁ/	/h/ where necessary
ə	le siñə mw	/lə siɲ mu/	sometimes-silent /e/
×	le siñə du pluryèl ɛ̃sonor	/lə siɲ dy ply.ʁjɛl ɛ̃.sɔ.nɔʁ/	sometimes-silent plural (e.g. femmes → fam×)
◌̇	le point de différenciation		marker of homophones (e.g. ça → ṡa, whereas sa → sa)

=== Punctuation marks ===
He also proposed six new "points d’intonation" (punctuation marks):

Bazin's proposed punctuation marks from Plumons l’Oiseau (1966)

Acclamation

Authority

Conviction

Doubt

Irony

Love

Example:

Standard orthography	Ortografiǝ lojikǝ
J’aime, dit l’amant, Je parle, dit le député, J’enseigne, dit le professeur, Je règne, dit le roi, Je crois, dit le moine, Je pense, dit le philosophe, Je trouve, dit le savant...	J’èmǝ di l’amã, Je parlǝ, di le député, J’ãsèñǝ, di le profèsœr, Je rèñǝ di le rw͐a, Je krw͐a di le mw͐anǝ, Je pãsǝ, di le filozofǝ, Je trwvǝ, di le savã...

== Published works ==
- Jour, poems, 1947
- A la poursuite d'Iris, poems, 1948
- Vipère au poing (Viper in the Fist), autobiographical novel, 1948
- La Tête contre les murs, novel, publié en 1949
- La Mort du petit cheval, autobiographical novel, 1950 (Note: Sequel to "Vipère au poing")
- Le bureau des mariages, short stories, 1951
- Lève-toi et marche, novel, 1952
- Humeurs, poems, 1953
- Contre vents et marées, 1953
- L'Huile sur le feu, novel, 1954
- Qui j'ose aimer, novel, 1956
- La fin des asiles, essay, 1959
- Au nom du fils, novel, 1960
- Chapeau bas, short stories, 1963 : Chapeau bas, Bouc émissaire, La hotte, M. le conseiller du coeur, Souvenirs d'un amnésique, Mansarde à louer, La Clope
- Plumons l'oiseau, essay, 1966
- Le Matrimoine, novel, 1967
- Les bienheureux de La Désolation, account, 1970 (Note: The story of the total population evacuation of the island of Tristan da Cunha (also known as "La Désolation") following the 1961 volcanic eruption, their refusal of the consumerist society of England, where they had been resettled, and their iron will to come back to their island and repopulate one of the hardest places to live in the world, and live according to their own ideal. Published in English as Tristan: A Novel.)
- Le Cri de la chouette, autobiographical novel, 1972 (Note: A sequel to "Vipère au poing" and "La mort du petit cheval")
- Madame Ex, novel, 1975
- Traits, 1976
- Ce que je crois, 1977
- Un feu dévore un autre feu, 1978
- L'Église verte, novel, 1981
- Qui est le prince?, 1981
- Abécédaire, 1984
- Le Démon de minuit, 1988
- L'École des pères, novel, 1991
- Le grand méchant doux, 1992
- Le Neuvième jour, 1994

== Honors and awards ==
- Grand Officer of the Order of Legion of Honour (1994)
- Officer of the Ordre National du Mérite (1978)

== Sources ==
- Jean-Louis de Rambures, "Comment travaillent les écrivains", Paris 1978 (interview with Hervé Bazin, in French)
