= Susanna Cappellaro =

Italian actress and writer

Susanna Cappellaro is a London-based Italian actress, director, stylist, and writer. In 2012, she played Naomi Collins in Tim Burton's Dark Shadows, playing the mother of Johnny Depp's character, Barnabas Collins. In 2024, she directed the documentary, My Husband, the Cyborg.

== Biography ==
Cappellaro studied acting at the London School of Dramatic Art, graduating in 2009.

Cappellaro started her career in the fashion world as a stylist at Flair Magazine in Milan before moving onto MTV Italy. She also wrote for XL-La Repubblica, Rodeo Magazine, Flair and Vogue.

In 2011, she began her film career. Her first role was in the film Berberian Sound Studio. Her next role was playing a journalist alongside Filippo Timi in the Italian film Notte Finisce con Gallo. In 2012, she played Naomi Collins in Tim Burton's Dark Shadows, playing the mother of Johnny Depp's character, Barnabas Collins.

In 2014, Cappellaro produced and acted in the short file Checkmate, directed by Jason Bradbury and starring Ornella Muti and Sian Phillips. In 2015, she took on first leading role in Papagajka, a psychological thriller set in Sarajevo.

In 2024, she directed the documentary, My Husband, the Cyborg. The Guardian called it "a cheeky programming choice" and said when Cappellaro "turns the camera on herself, her natural warmth, humour and intelligence come across well... the slow collapse of their relationship is oddly compelling – if a bit sad – to watch."

== Personal life ==
Cappellaro was married to Scott Cohen.
