= Viper in the Fist =

1948 novel by Hervé Bazin

- 1948 edition (in the series Le Livre de Poche)
- Author: Hervé Bazin
- Original title: Vipère au Poing
- Language: French
- Series: Rezeau Trilogy
- Genre: Autobiographical novel
- Publisher: Bernard Grasset
- Publication date: 15 May 1948
- Publication place: France
- Media type: Print
- Followed by: La Mort du Petit Cheval

Viper in the Fist (French: Vipère au Poing) is a novel by Hervé Bazin, published on 15 May 1948 by Bernard Grasset in Paris. It is the first and best known of a trilogy—known as the Rezeau Trilogy—the other two novels being La Mort du Petit Cheval (1950) and Le Cri de la Chouette (1972). The novels are largely autobiographical, drawing on Bazin's difficult childhood with his mother.

When published in 1948, Vipère au Poing was an immense popular success and also the cause of considerable scandal. It is nowadays considered a classic novel in France, widely read by secondary school students. (Note: The novel is a standard text in the French national curriculum.)

== Synopsis ==
Young Jean lives with his grandparents. When his grandmother dies, his parents come back from China (French Indochina in the 2004 film adaptation) where his father (Jacques) teaches law. He and his brothers then discover that their mother Paule is a horrible woman, who hates her life and her children. She is extremely severe with them, deliberately unfair to the point of cruelty. Their father is a weak man who, except on rare occasions, submits to his wife's will. He spends his time in entomology studies.

Gradually, the situation turns to a perverse domestic war. Paule seizes any pretext for being cruel to her sons, and especially to Jean. Jean and his brother attempt to kill their mother twice: once with an overdose of medicine (which only gave her diarrhea); once by attempting to drown her in the river, making it seem an accident. She escapes.

On one occasion, she asks her sons' personal educator to flog Jean as a punishment. Jean escapes and goes to see his grandfather, a senator living in an upscale area of Paris. He is brought back by his father, who is fairly embarrassed by the situation.

Jean is now 15. He discovers sex with Madeleine, a young farmer's daughter from the area. He does not love her, for he distrusts all women, in whom he sees his own mother. He claims women are little but a receptacle for semen.

Paule tries to have her son caught red-handed for theft by intentionally leaving her wallet in Jean's bedroom. Jean foils her plot and after a short confrontation, he obtains what he wants, and what Paule wants too: the departure of Jean and his brother to a boarding school.

Jean concludes his memoirs by saying that while it seems that he has won, in reality Paule has destroyed his whole being. Throughout his life, he'll not be able to feel trust or love.

== Social criticism ==
Viper in the Fist, while short, is a vitriolic indictment of early 20th century French rural bourgeois society. Bazin's hatred for this social milieu is obvious. He depicts a family where hypocrisy is rampant and where observance of Catholic rituals is far more important than virtues like love or compassion. While most portraits of common people seem good-hearted, depictions of the bourgeoisie and the ecclesiastical world are generally despicable. The various priests as educators collaborate with the narrator's mother's cruel follies and betray their lack of virtue with venal acts such as fornication with young women.

The universe that Bazin depicts — rural bourgeois rentiers — is slowly dying, but the characters do not seem to recognize this. They consider themselves the salt of the earth, replacing the former nobility, who failed in keeping France on a path they consider worthy. Like the nobility, they despise commerce. They have lofty opinions of themselves, yet their lives are mostly ruined. They cease to support the monarchist Action Française only because the Pope requested it, not because they themselves judged that it was repugnant.

== Movie adaptation ==
A 1971 television film adaptation, Vipère au poing, was directed by Pierre Cardinal.

A film adaptation of Viper in the Fist, titled Viper in the Fist (Vipère au Poing in French), was released in 2004. The movie was directed by Philippe de Broca, and starred Jules Sitruk as Jean Rezeau "Brasse-Bouillon", Jacques Villeret as Jacques Rezeau, and Catherine Frot as Paule Rezeau.
