= Peter Strickland (director) =

British film director and screenwriter (born 1973)

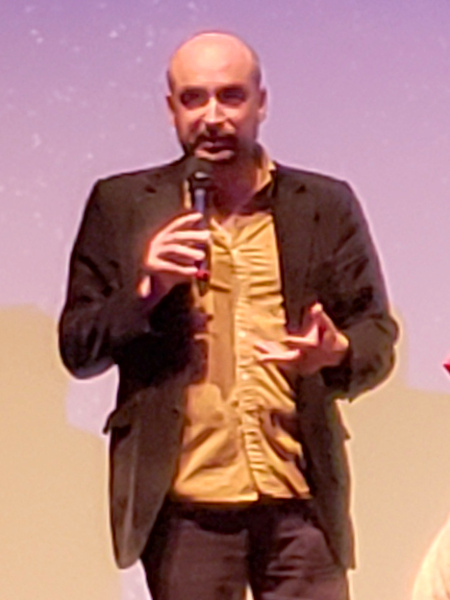
- Strickland at Cultplex cinema, Manchester, October 2025
- Born: 21 May 1973 (age 53); Reading, Berkshire, England
- Occupations: Film director, screenwriter
- Years active: 1996–present

Peter Strickland is a British film director and screenwriter. He is best known for his films Berberian Sound Studio (2012), The Duke of Burgundy (2014) and In Fabric (2018).

== Life and career ==
Strickland was born to a Greek mother and British father, both teachers, and grew up in Reading, Berkshire, where he was a member of Progress Theatre, directing his own adaptation of The Metamorphosis by Franz Kafka. In 1997, his short film Bubblegum was entered in the Berlin Film Festival. He made a short version of what would become Berberian Sound Studio in 2005. For most of the 2000s, he lived in Slovakia and Hungary.

His first feature, the low-budget rural revenge drama Katalin Varga, was financed by an inheritance from an uncle and filmed in Romania over a period of 17 days in 2006. It won the European Film Award for European Discovery of the Year in 2009.

His second, Berberian Sound Studio, is a psychological thriller set in a 1970s Italian horror film studio and starring Toby Jones. It was previewed at London FrightFest Film Festival in August 2012 and at the 2012 Edinburgh International Film Festival, where Robbie Collin of The Daily Telegraph described it as the "stand-out movie". In 2013, the film obtained the Best International Film Award at BAFICI. Peter Bradshaw of The Guardian described Berberian Sound Studio as marking Strickland's emergence as "a key British film-maker of his generation".

His third feature, the chamber drama The Duke of Burgundy, was an homage to Jess Franco starring Sidse Babett Knudsen and Chiara D'Anna. It received overwhelming praise from critics, and appeared on The A.V. Club and Indiewire best film lists for 2015.

In 2018, Strickland released In Fabric, a psychological horror film about a haunted dress purchased in a London department store. Like his previous film, it received universal critical acclaim. It appeared in multiple best of the year critics' polls, including those of The Playlist and Sight & Sound.

== Filmography ==
- Bubblegum (short, 1996)
- A Metaphysical Education (short, 2004)
- Katalin Varga (2009)
- Berberian Sound Studio (2012)
- Björk: Biophilia Live (2014)
- The Duke of Burgundy (2014)
- The Field Guide to Evil (2018, segment "The Cobblers' Lot")
- In Fabric (2018)
- GUO4 (short, 2019)
- Cold Meridian (short, 2020)
- Blank Narcissus (Passion of the Swamp) (short, 2022)
- Flux Gourmet (2022)

== Radio credits ==
- The Len Continuum (2015, BBC Radio 4)
- The Stone Tape (2016, BBC Radio 4)
- The Len Dimension (2017, BBC Radio 4)
- The Third Consecutive Event in Talbot Leigh (2019, BBC Radio 4)
- Jason's Mates (2022, BBC Radio 4)
