= Katalin Varga (film) =

2009 film by Peter Strickland

Katalin Varga is a 2009 film directed by Peter Strickland.

The feature debut of Peter Strickland, he used the money from a bequest from his uncle to fund the project. Filmed over 17 days in the Hungarian-speaking part of the Romanian region of Transylvania, Strickland completed the project for £28,000.

== Plot ==
Katalin Varga's husband discovers that their son Orbán is not his. Together with her child, she sets out to find Antal, the man who raped her 11 years earlier, Orbán's biological father. She meets Gergely, a friend and accomplice of Antal, who does not recognize her. She seduces and then kills him. Orbán befriends Antal, both unaware of their blood ties. Antal is now a happily married man, and Katalin strikes up an intimate friendship with his wife. On a boating trip, she confronts them both about the events which occurred 11 years earlier.

== Reception ==
On Rotten Tomatoes the film received an acceptance rate of 95% with an average rating of 7.40/10 based on 21 reviews.

British film critic Peter Bradshaw gave the film 4 out of 5 stars in a review for The Guardian, saying “Strickland’s film is intriguing: a slow-moving, insistently gripping, faintly Dostoyevskian tale of violence and retribution set in the swooningly photographed Romanian countryside. It’s the sort of film that looks as if it is going to drift dreamily away in an arthouse torpor; in fact, it comes to a satisfying narrative crunch. There is actual suspense, of a sort. It’s a woozy noir, with a hint of the supernatural.”

== Accolades ==
The film was in the competition for the Golden Bear at the 59th Berlin International Film Festival in 2009, where it was awarded the Silver Bear for Outstanding Artistic Contribution (sound design): György Kovács, Gábor ifj. Erdélyi and Tamás Székely. It won the European Film Award for European Discovery of the Year in 2009.
