= Potato (Blackadder) =

- Blackadder episode
- Episode no.: Series 2 Episode 3
- Directed by: Mandie Fletcher
- Written by: Ben Elton; Richard Curtis
- Original air date: 23 January 1986

Guest appearances
- Tom Baker as Captain Rum; Simon Jones as Sir Walter Raleigh

Episode chronology
← Previous "Head"	Next → "Money"

"Potato" is the third episode of the BBC sitcom Blackadder II, the second series of Blackadder, which was set in Elizabethan England from 1558 to 1603.

== Plot ==
While the rest of London is celebrating the return of Sir Walter Raleigh, Blackadder stays at home, and refuses to join the festivities. He is unimpressed with explorers in general, and is also annoyed with Sir Walter making a fortune from discovering potatoes. Blackadder reluctantly joins Melchett at the royal palace to welcome Sir Walter, who impresses the Queen with his tales of daring exploration and discovery. Sir Walter reveals that sailors do not count the sea around the Cape of Good Hope as part of the Seven Seas, which is known as "the sea of certain death". Blackadder, in an attempt to upstage the explorer, suddenly announces his imminent plans to make that very journey, to the delight and admiration of the royal court. The Queen even suggests she will marry Blackadder when he returns. Sir Walter states that only one sailor would be "mad enough" to attempt the journey: Captain Redbeard Rum.

Blackadder seeks out Rum, who, despite being both legless and ramblingly insane, he employs as captain for the voyage, bringing Baldrick and Percy along as well. Once their journey starts, Blackadder reveals his real plan: sailing to France for a few months, then going back home and falsely claiming to have sailed to the Cape of Good Hope. Rum admits that he does not know the way to the Cape of Good Hope and intended to resort to his usual trick of "circling the Isle of Wight until everybody gets dizzy". Unfortunately, after sailing for three days, they run into a serious problem; Rum does not know how to get to France either, and in fact does not know how to navigate at all. Utterly lost, they sail for six months, having run out of food and water and reduced to drinking urine, when their ship finally runs aground. Unfortunately, they find themselves on a tropical island with lava streams, mangroves and cannibalistic natives.

Two years later, Blackadder, Baldrick and Percy land back in Britain, where they tell Nursie that Captain Rum sacrificed himself to the natives to save them. They give her Captain Rum's beard as a memento. The Queen refuses to marry Blackadder, having been grown tired of explorers in the interrim, and demands a souvenir. After Blackadder gives the Queen a boomerang, he gives Melchett and Raleigh bottles of Baldrick's urine, which Blackadder passes off as "fine wine".

== Cast ==
- Rowan Atkinson as Lord Edmund Blackadder
- Tim McInnerny as Lord Percy Percy
- Tony Robinson as Baldrick
- Miranda Richardson as Queen Elizabeth I
- Stephen Fry as Lord Melchett
- Patsy Byrne as Nursie
- Tom Baker as Captain Redbeard Rum
- Simon Jones as Sir Walter Raleigh

== Notes ==
Tom Baker has described his own performance as "appalling". Baker was quoted: "Someone should have taken away my Equity Card. It was terrible and the buggers keep playing it." In an interview with Radio Times, Baker said his memories of working with Atkinson were "a little tainted." He stated that Atkinson told him to play his role as "boring" as possible, which was advice he gave to all guest actors. However, after playing his role as "boring" in the final rehearsal, Baker was told not to by the show's producer against Atkinson's advice.
