= Chains (Blackadder) =

- Blackadder episode
- Episode no.: Series 2 Episode 6
- Directed by: Mandie Fletcher
- Written by: Ben Elton; Richard Curtis
- Original air date: 20 February 1986

Guest appearances
- Hugh Laurie as Prince Ludwig the Indestructible; Mark Arden as Torturer; Lee Cornes as 1st Guard; Max Harvey as 2nd Guard

Episode chronology
← Previous "Beer"	Next → "Dish and Dishonesty"

"Chains" is the final episode of the BBC sitcom Blackadder II, the second series of Blackadder, which was set in Elizabethan England from 1558 to 1603. Power-mad and self-professed "master of disguise", Prince Ludwig the Indestructible kidnaps Lord Blackadder and Lord Melchett. They escape his clutches but Prince Ludwig infiltrates the palace during a fancy dress ball. The episode was recorded 14 July 1985.

== Plot ==
Melchett tells Queenie that his former tutor's son has been kidnapped, and begs for her to pay the hefty ransom. Queenie consults Lord Blackadder on the matter, who states that "only an idiot" would be so foolish as to be kidnapped. After Blackadder leaves the throne room, he is knocked unconscious by two men, with Melchett suffering the same fate after he has convinced Queenie to pay the ransom. The two then awaken in a damp cell in a dungeon with a Spanish torturer. Blackadder, who does not speak Spanish, and the torturer engage in a lengthy game of charades to determine the exact insults, threats, and mode of torture. Later, Prince Ludwig the Indestructible, a German spy and master of disguise, enters the dungeon and reveals he has demanded Queenie pay a ransom within one week. Percy reads Ludwig's message back to Queenie, informing her she can only choose to free Melchett or Blackadder.

A week later, Ludwig returns with the message from Queenie, which reveals that she has instead decided to spend the ransom money on "a big party". Ludwig offers to imprison Blackadder and Melchett for life instead of killing them, in exchange for information on how to get into the palace during the party. Sometime later, he returns to bid farewell to his prisoners, but his temper emerges when Blackadder deduces he was bullied at school. When Ludwig leaves, Blackadder and Melchett manage to overpower the two guards who have come to deliver food and escape, returning to England and arriving just in time for Queenie's costume party. Edmund promptly stabs "Nursie", who is revealed to be Prince Ludwig masquerading as Nursie dressed as a cow, just as the real Nursie arrives. Ludwig becomes enraged when Queenie greets him by an embarrassing nickname, "Shorty-Greasy-Spot-Spot". He flees, vowing to return. Blackadder throws a dagger at Ludwig, causing him to cry out in pain. When asked how he knew the cow was Ludwig, Blackadder informs the group that Ludwig would have the more impressive costume.

In a post-credits scene, it is revealed that Ludwig has managed to murder everyone in a sneak attack. Ludwig, now disguised as Queenie, stands over them holding a blood-soaked dagger and claims that impersonating the queen is a role he will enjoy – if he can "just get the voice right."

== Cast ==
- Rowan Atkinson as Lord Edmund Blackadder
- Hugh Laurie as Prince Ludwig the Indestructible
- Stephen Fry as Lord Melchett
- Tim McInnerny as Lord Percy Percy
- Tony Robinson as Baldrick
- Miranda Richardson as Queen Elizabeth I
- Patsy Byrne as Nursie
- Max Harvey as the Torturer
- Mark Arden as the 1st Guard
- Lee Cornes as the 2nd Guard
