= Blackadder's Christmas Carol =

1988 Christmas special of Blackadder

- Title screen
- Genre: Period, sitcom
- Written by: Richard Curtis; Ben Elton
- Directed by: Richard Boden
- Starring: Rowan Atkinson; Tony Robinson; Stephen Fry; Hugh Laurie; Robbie Coltrane; Miranda Richardson; Miriam Margolyes; Jim Broadbent
- Theme music composer: Howard Goodall
- Country of origin: United Kingdom
- Original language: English

Production
- Producer: John Lloyd
- Camera setup: Multi-camera
- Running time: 42 minutes

Original release
- Network: BBC1
- Release: 23 December 1988

Related
- Blackadder: The Cavalier Years; Blackadder Goes Forth

Blackadder's Christmas Carol, a one-off episode of Blackadder, is a Christmas special parody of Charles Dickens' 1843 novella A Christmas Carol. It is set between Blackadder the Third (1987) and Blackadder Goes Forth (1989), and is narrated by Hugh Laurie. Produced by the BBC, it was first broadcast on BBC1 on 23 December 1988.

== Plot ==
Ebenezer Blackadder (Rowan Atkinson), the Victorian proprietor of a "moustache shop", is the nicest man in England. He is everything that Ebenezer Scrooge was by the end of the original story: generous and kind to everybody, and sensitive to the misery of others. As a result, people take advantage of his kindness – Mrs. Scratchit and a young boy take all his money, his god-daughter Millicent takes his presents and Christmas tree, and a beadle takes his food. All but Mr. Baldrick (Tony Robinson) view him as a victim. His business turns no profit, all his earnings go to charity and con artists, and despite his positive attitude, he lives a lonely, miserable life.

One Christmas Eve, Blackadder's destiny changes when the Spirit of Christmas (Robbie Coltrane) visits him to congratulate him for his ways. The Spirit lets him see two shades of the past: his Blackadder ancestors (the protagonists of Blackadder II and Blackadder the Third). Instead of providing positive reinforcement that Ebenezer is better than his forefathers, these visions lead him to admire them and their wit. He asks the Spirit to show him what could happen if he became like them. He sees a vision of a distant future where his descendant, Grand Admiral Blackadder, is a successful and ruthless official of a galactic empire, about to marry the similarly ruthless and insanely ambitious Queen Asphyxia XIX (Miranda Richardson) after murdering her "triple husbandoid" (Hugh Laurie, Stephen Fry and Patsy Byrne). The future Baldrick, wearing a loincloth, is Blackadder's slave. Blackadder asks the Spirit what will happen if he stays as he is. He is shown an alternative future in which his descendant is the loincloth-clad slave of the incompetent Admiral Baldrick.

Contrary to the Spirit's intended point, Blackadder takes "the very clear lesson that bad guys have all the fun". On Christmas morning, he wakes up a different man: bitter, vengeful, greedy, and insulting to everyone he meets, including Baldrick. Now feeling in control of his life, he misses an opportunity when he insults two strangers who claim to be Queen Victoria (Miriam Margolyes) and Prince Albert (Jim Broadbent) and throws them out of his home. The episode ends on Blackadder's extravagant Christmas dinner, which is ruined when Baldrick shows him the royal seal left behind by the strangers, proving Baldrick's story that the Queen and Prince Albert had planned to award Blackadder a gift of £50,000 and the title of Baron Blackadder for being the "nicest man in England".

=== Edited version ===
Most versions of this special edit an early scene when Baldrick discusses a dog used as Jesus for the Nativity play, removing one line in which Baldrick says the dog would be nailed to a cross for a repeat Easter performance. The earliest known case of this edit was on its first rerun in December 1989. The same version was used for later terrestrial broadcasts when the special aired at Christmas in the years 1998, 2007, 2008, 2010, 2012, 2017, 2019, 2023 and 2024. The edited version is also seen in the Blackadder Ultimate Edition DVD set and on the UK channel Gold since 2018 (the uncut version was screened until 2017). The original uncut version can be seen on the Region 1 U.S. DVD set.

== Cast ==
- Rowan Atkinson as Ebenezer Blackadder/Edmund, Lord Blackadder/Mr. E. Blackadder Esq./Grand Admiral Blackadder/Slave Blackadder
- Tony Robinson as Mr. Baldrick and his ancestors and descendants
- Stephen Fry as Lord Melchett/Lord Frondo
- Hugh Laurie as Prince George/Lord Pigmot as well as the narrator.
- Miranda Richardson as Queen Elizabeth/Queen Asphyxia XIX
- Robbie Coltrane as the Spirit of Christmas
- Miriam Margolyes as Queen Victoria
- Jim Broadbent as Prince Albert
- Patsy Byrne as Nursie/Bernard
- Denis Lill as Beadle
- Pauline Melville as Mrs. Scratchit
- Philip Pope as Lord Nelson
- Nicola Bryant as Millicent, Blackadder's goddaughter ("Awful Screeching Woman" on BBC DVD cover)
- Ramsay Gilderdale as Ralph, Millicent's fiancé ("Giggling Ninny" on BBC DVD cover)
- David Barber, Erkan Mustafa and David Nunn as the Enormous Orphans

== See also ==
- List of A Christmas Carol adaptations
- "Merry Christmas, Mr. Bean" – another Christmas show starring Rowan Atkinson
- List of Christmas films
