= Head (Blackadder) =

- Blackadder episode
- Episode no.: Series 2 Episode 2
- Directed by: Mandie Fletcher
- Written by: Ben Elton; Richard Curtis
- Original air date: 16 January 1986

Guest appearances
- Holly de Jong; Bill Wallis; Linda Polan; Patrick Duncan

Episode chronology
← Previous "Bells"	Next → "Potato"

"Head" is the second episode of the BBC period comedy Blackadder II, the second series of Blackadder, which was set in Elizabethan England from 1558 to 1603.

== Plot ==
Blackadder is attempting to teach Baldrick the basic concepts of addition when he is summoned to court, and is informed that the Lord High Executioner has died, having signed his name on the wrong dotted line and so accidentally ordered his own execution. With the Queen's ongoing persecution against the Catholics, a new Lord High Executioner must be appointed and Melchett has assembled a list of suitable candidates for the job, with only one name on it: Lord Blackadder.

Saddled with a position he sardonically describes as "Minister in charge of Religious Genocide", Blackadder sets about organising the various executions to be carried out, and meets up with his staff: The Jailor Mr. Ploppy, the prison cook Mrs. Ploppy (no relation) and the executioner, revealed to be Baldrick. To give himself the middle of the week off, he makes a simple change by moving up the date of execution for Lord Farrow from Wednesday to Monday, quipping that Farrow got time off for good behaviour.

However, this simple change goes completely awry when the Queen allows Farrow's wife to visit her husband in prison on Tuesday, the day before his originally scheduled execution, not aware that he has already been executed. As he is already too late, Blackadder pretends to be Farrow, disguising himself with a bag over his head, as the Queen had given Lady Farrow a death warrant to give to Edmund should he refuse her. He is nearly thwarted, first when he discovers that Farrow had many individual traits, such as a deep voice, being much taller than him, and missing half an arm, and then when Lady Farrow attempts to take the bag off his head. Nevertheless, he manages to go undetected.

Afterward, the Queen decides to pardon Farrow, saying 'He probably is innocent anyway'. Blackadder and Percy decide that the only way to get around this problem is to pretend that they had been taking Farrow to see the Queen, when he said something traitorous in the hallway, and he and Percy had cut his head off there. Upon searching for the head in Traitor's Cloister, they realise the plan will not work, as the head already looks decomposed. However, Lord Percy notices that the head that Blackadder found on Farrow's spike is not actually Lord Farrow's, but rather that of Lord Ponsonby, another death row inmate whose execution was scheduled for Friday, meaning that Baldrick had killed the wrong man and Farrow was alive the entire time.

Blackadder is relieved, until he remembers that the Queen is on her way to the prison at that very moment to visit Lord Ponsonby, and he hurries there just in time to pretend to be Ponsonby for the Queen, just as he had done with Farrow, despite Ponsonby having only one leg, a hunch and a speech impediment.

== Cast ==
- Rowan Atkinson as Edmund Blackadder
- Tim McInnerny as Lord Percy Percy
- Tony Robinson as Baldrick
- Miranda Richardson as Queen Elizabeth I
- Stephen Fry as Lord Melchett
- Patsy Byrne as Nursie
- Holly de Jong as Lady Farrow
- Bill Wallis as Ploppy the Gaoler (son of Ploppy the Slopper)
- Linda Polan as Mrs. Ploppy
- Patrick Duncan as Earl Farrow
