= Blackadder =

British TV sitcom (1983–1989)

- Left to right: Tim McInnerny (as Darling), Rowan Atkinson (as Blackadder), Stephen Fry (as Melchett), Tony Robinson (as Baldrick), and Hugh Laurie (as George) in Blackadder Goes Forth
- Genre: Period sitcom
- Created by: Richard Curtis; Rowan Atkinson
- Written by: Richard Curtis; Rowan Atkinson (series 1); Ben Elton (series 2–4)
- Directed by: Martin Shardlow (series 1); Mandie Fletcher (series 2–3); Richard Boden (series 4)
- Starring: Rowan Atkinson; Tony Robinson; Hugh Laurie; Stephen Fry; Tim McInnerny; Miranda Richardson
- Theme music composer: Howard Goodall
- Country of origin: United Kingdom
- Original language: English
- No. of series: 4
- No. of episodes: 24 (plus 4 specials) (list of episodes)

Production
- Producer: John Lloyd
- Camera setup: Multi-camera
- Running time: 30 minutes approx
- Production company: BBC

Original release
- Network: BBC1
- Release: 15 June 1983 – 2 November 1989

Blackadder is a series of four period British sitcoms — The Black Adder, Blackadder II, Blackadder the Third and Blackadder Goes Forth — along with several one-off installments, that originally aired on BBC1 from 1983 to 1989. All episodes starred Rowan Atkinson as the antihero Edmund Blackadder and Tony Robinson as Blackadder's servant Baldrick. Each series was set in a different historical period, with the two protagonists accompanied by different characters, though several reappear in one series or another, including Tim McInnerny as Percy and Darling, Stephen Fry as Melchett, and Hugh Laurie as George.

The first series was written by Atkinson and Richard Curtis, while the subsequent three series were written by Curtis and Ben Elton. All four series were produced by John Lloyd. In 2000, Blackadder Goes Forth ranked at 16 in the 100 Greatest British Television Programmes, a list created by the British Film Institute. In a 2001 poll by Channel 4, Edmund Blackadder was ranked third on their list of the 100 Greatest TV Characters. In the 2004 TV poll to find Britain's Best Sitcom, Blackadder (all four series combined) was voted the second-best British sitcom of all time, topped by Only Fools and Horses. It was also ranked as the ninth-best TV show of all time by Empire magazine in 2009. Atkinson has said Blackadder was "the least stressful" of all his work, due to the "feeling of shared responsibility among a lot of really good actors".

== Premise ==
Each series comprises six half-hour episodes and is set in a different period of British history. The first series, made in 1983, was titled The Black Adder and was set in the fictional reign of "Richard IV". The second series, Blackadder II (1986), was set during the reign of Elizabeth I. Blackadder the Third (1987) was set in the Regency era in the late 18th and early 19th centuries during the reign of George III. Blackadder Goes Forth (1989) was set in 1917 in the trenches of the Great War.

Blackadder follows the misfortunes of Edmund Blackadder (played by Atkinson). It is implied in each series that the Blackadder character is a descendant of the previous one. The end theme lyrics of the series 2 episode "Head" specify that he is the great-grandson of the previous incarnation, although it is never specified how or when any of the Blackadders (who are usually bachelors) manage to father children.

In series 1, Edmund Blackadder is not particularly bright, and is much the intellectual inferior of his servant, Baldrick (played by Tony Robinson). However, in subsequent series, the positions are reversed: Blackadder is clever, shrewd, scheming and manipulative while Baldrick is extremely dim.

Each incarnation of Blackadder and Baldrick is also saddled with tolerating the presence of a dimwitted aristocrat. In the first two series, this is Percy, played by Tim McInnerny. Hugh Laurie plays the role in the third and fourth series, as George. Characters of a higher organisational standing, such as Stephen Fry's Melchett in series 2 and 4, and McInnerny's other character, Darling, in series 4, provide antagonistic figures for Blackadder to deal with.

== Episodes ==
Series	Episodes	Originally released	
Series	Episodes	First released	Last released
Pilot		15 June 2023	
1	6	15 June 1983	20 July 1983
2	6	9 January 1986	20 February 1986
3	6	17 September 1987	22 October 1987
Specials	2	5 February 1988	23 December 1988
4	6	28 September 1989	2 November 1989
Back & Forth		31 December 1999	

=== Series 1: The Black Adder ===
The Black Adder, the first series of Blackadder, was written by Richard Curtis and Rowan Atkinson and produced by John Lloyd, who would also produce the subsequent three series. It originally aired on BBC1 from 15 June to 20 July 1983, and was a joint production with the Australian Seven Network.

Set in 1485 at the end of the British Middle Ages, the series is written as an alternative history in which Richard III won the Battle of Bosworth Field only to be mistaken for someone else and killed, and is succeeded by Richard IV (Brian Blessed), one of the Princes in the Tower. The series follows the exploits of Richard IV's unfavoured second son Prince Edmund, the Duke of Edinburgh (played by Atkinson), who calls himself "The Black Adder", in his various attempts to increase his standing with his father and his eventual quest to overthrow him. Other regular characters in this series are Edmund's mother Gertrude, Queen of Flanders (Elspet Gray), his brother Harry, Prince of Wales (Robert East), his sidekick Lord Percy Percy, the Duke of Northumberland (Tim McInnerny), and his squire Baldrick (Tony Robinson). Guest appearances in this series include Peter Cook as King Richard III, Russell Enoch as the Duke of Winchester, Miriam Margolyes as the Infanta Maria Escalosa of Spain (with Jim Broadbent as her interpreter), Frank Finlay as the Witchsmeller Pursuivant, Valentine Dyall as Lord Angus, Stephen Frost and Mark Arden as guards, and Rik Mayall as Mad Gerald.

Conceived while Atkinson and Curtis were working on Not the Nine O'Clock News, the series dealt comically with a number of aspects of medieval life in Britain: witchcraft, royal succession, European relations, the Crusades, and the conflict between the Church and the Crown. Along with the secret history, many historical events portrayed in the series were anachronistic (for example, Constantinople had already fallen to the Ottoman Empire in 1453, predating the events in the episode by 32 years); this dramatic licence would continue in the three subsequent Blackadder series. The filming of The Black Adder was highly ambitious, with a large cast and much location shooting. The series also featured Shakespearean dialogue, often adapted for comic effect; the end credits featured the words "Additional Dialogue by William Shakespeare".

=== Series 2: Blackadder II ===
Blackadder II, the second series of Blackadder, was written by Richard Curtis and Ben Elton, the team who would also write the subsequent two series, and originally aired on BBC1 from 9 January to 20 February 1986. The series is set in England during the reign of Queen Elizabeth I (1558–1603), often referred to as "Queenie", who is portrayed by Miranda Richardson. The principal character is Edmund, Lord Blackadder (Rowan Atkinson), the great-grandson of the original Black Adder. During the series, he regularly deals with the Queen, her obsequious Lord Chamberlain Lord Melchett (Stephen Fry; his rival for the Queen's affections), his friend Lord Percy Percy (Tim McInnerny) and the Queen's demented former nanny Nursie (Patsy Byrne). Tony Robinson returned as Blackadder's servant Baldrick. Guest appearances in the series include Tom Baker as Captain Redbeard Rum, Simon Jones as Sir Walter Raleigh, Ronald Lacey as the Bishop of Bath and Wells, and Miriam Margoyles as Blackadder's aunt, Lady Whiteadder. The series also features two appearances by Hugh Laurie (as Simon Partridge, a friend of Blackadder's, in the episode "Beer", and as Prince Ludwig the Indestructible in the series' finale "Chains"), a returning Rik Mayall, this time as Lord Flashheart, and the first appearance of Gabrielle Glaister as Kate/"Bob" (a young woman who pretends to be a boy in order to achieve a well-paying job).

Following the BBC's request for improvements (and a severe budget reduction), several changes were made. In addition to Ben Elton joining Richard Curtis as co-writer, this second series was the first to establish the familiar Blackadder character: cunning, shrewd and witty, in sharp contrast to the first series' bumbling Prince Edmund. To reduce the cost of production, it was shot with virtually no outdoor scenes (the first series was shot largely on location) and several frequently used indoor sets, such as the Queen's throne room and Blackadder's front room.

In 2008, a quote from this series ranked number three in a list of the top 25 television "putdowns" of the past 40 years by the Radio Times magazine: "The eyes are open, the mouth moves, but Mr. Brain has long since departed, hasn't he, Percy?"

=== Series 3: Blackadder the Third ===
Blackadder the Third, the third series of Blackadder, originally aired on BBC1 from 17 September to 22 October 1987. The series is set in the Regency period, the late 18th and early 19th centuries. In the series, Mr. Edmund Blackadder Esquire (Rowan Atkinson) is a butler to George, Prince Regent, played by Hugh Laurie as a buffoonish fop. Despite Edmund's respected intelligence and abilities, he has no personal fortune to speak of, apart from his frequently fluctuating wage packet from the Prince (“If I’m running short of cash, all I have to do is go upstairs and ask Prince Fathead for a raise”), and from (it seems) stealing the Prince's socks and selling them off. As usual, Blackadder also has his own servant Baldrick (Tony Robinson). The episode titles were puns on Jane Austen’s novels Sense and Sensibility and Pride and Prejudice.

Along with Atkinson, Robinson, and Laurie, this series also starred Helen Atkinson-Wood as Mrs. Miggins. The series features Dr. Samuel Johnson (Robbie Coltrane); William Pitt the Younger (Simon Osborne); the French Revolution (with Chris Barrie, Tim McInnerny as the Scarlet Pimpernel, and Nigel Planer); hammy theatrical actors (Kenneth Connor and Hugh Paddick); Samuel Taylor Coleridge (Jim Sweeney); Shelley (Lee Cornes); Lord Byron (Steve Steen); Amy Hardwood (aka "The Shadow") (Miranda Richardson); and the Duke of Wellington (Stephen Fry).

=== Series 4: Blackadder Goes Forth ===
Blackadder Goes Forth, the fourth and final series of Blackadder, originally aired on BBC1 from 28 September to 2 November 1989. This series is set in 1917, on the Western Front of the First World War. Another "big push" is planned, and Captain Edmund Blackadder (Rowan Atkinson) has one goal—to avoid being killed—but his schemes always land him back in the trenches. Blackadder is joined by his batman Private S. Baldrick (Tony Robinson) and idealistic Edwardian twit Lieutenant George (Hugh Laurie). General Melchett (Stephen Fry) rallies his troops from a French château 35 miles (56 km) from the front, where he is aided and abetted by his assistant, Captain Kevin Darling (Tim McInnerny), pencil-pusher supreme and Blackadder's nemesis, whose last name is played on for maximum comedic value. Guest appearances in this series include Stephen Frost as the leader of a firing squad detail, Miranda Richardson as Nurse Mary Fletcher-Brown, two further appearances of Gabrielle Glaister as "Bob" (in this series, a young woman who pretends to be a boy in order to join the army), Rik Mayall as Royal Flying Corps Squadron Commander The Lord Flasheart, Adrian Edmondson as Baron Manfred von Richthofen (aka "The Red Baron"), and Geoffrey Palmer as Field Marshal Douglas Haig.

The series' tone is somewhat darker than the previous three series; it details the privations of trench warfare as well as the incompetence and life-wasting strategies of the top brass. For example, Baldrick is reduced to cooking rats and making coffee from mud, while General Melchett hatches a plan for the troops to walk very slowly toward the German lines, because "it'll be the last thing Fritz will expect."

The final episode, "Goodbyeee", is known for being extraordinarily poignant for a comedy – especially the final scene, which sees four of the five main characters (Blackadder, Baldrick, George, and Darling) finally going "over the top" and charging off into the fog and smoke of no man's land, presumably to die. In a list of the 100 Greatest British Television Programmes, drawn up by the British Film Institute in 2000 and voted for by industry professionals, Blackadder Goes Forth was placed 16th.

=== Specials ===
==== Pilot episode ====
A pilot episode of The Black Adder was shot in 1982, but was not broadcast on TV until 15 June 2023, when it was shown as part of an 80-minute UKTV Gold documentary titled Blackadder: The Lost Pilot, hosted by Sir Tony Robinson and featuring interviews with Ben Elton and Richard Curtis. Prior to this, only brief clips had been seen in the 2008 25th-anniversary documentary Blackadder Rides Again, shown on BBC1. One notable difference in the pilot, as in many pilots, is the casting. Baldrick is played not by Tony Robinson, but by Philip Fox. Another significant difference is that the character of Prince Edmund presented in the pilot is much closer to the intelligent, conniving Blackadder of the later series than the snivelling, weak buffoon of the original. Set in the year 1582, the script of the pilot is roughly the same as the episode "Born to Be King", albeit with some different jokes and some lines appearing in other episodes of the series.

==== Blackadder: The Cavalier Years ====
This special, set in the English Civil War, was shown as part of Comic Relief's Red Nose Day on Friday 5 February 1988. The 15-minute episode is set in November 1648, during the last days of the Civil War. Sir Edmund Blackadder and his servant, Baldrick, are the last two men loyal to the defeated King Charles I of England (played by Stephen Fry), portrayed as a soft-spoken, ineffective, naive character, with the voice and mannerisms of Charles I's namesake, the then Prince of Wales (now Charles III). However, owing to a misunderstanding between Oliver Cromwell (guest-star Warren Clarke) and Baldrick, the King is arrested and sent to the Tower of London. The rest of the episode revolves around Blackadder's attempts to save the King as well as improve his own standing.

==== Blackadder's Christmas Carol ====
The second special was broadcast on Friday 23 December 1988. In a twist on Charles Dickens' A Christmas Carol, Ebenezer Blackadder is the "kindest and loveliest" man in England. The Spirit of Christmas shows Blackadder the contrary antics of his ancestors and descendants, and reluctantly informs him that if he turns evil his descendants will enjoy power and fortune, while if he remains the same a future Blackadder will live shamefully subjugated to a future incompetent Baldrick. This remarkable encounter causes him to proclaim, "Bad guys have all the fun", and adopt the personality with which viewers are more familiar.

==== Blackadder: Back & Forth ====
Blackadder: Back & Forth was originally shown in the Millennium Dome in 1999, followed by a screening on Sky One in 2000, and later on BBC1 in 2002. It is set on New Year’s Eve 1999, and features Lord Blackadder placing a bet with his friends – modern versions of Queenie (Miranda Richardson), Melchett (Stephen Fry), George (Hugh Laurie) and Darling (Tim McInnerny) – that he has built a working time machine. While this is intended as a clever con trick, the machine surprisingly works, sending Blackadder and Baldrick back to the Cretaceous period, where they manage to cause the extinction of the dinosaurs through the use of Baldrick's best-worst-and-only pair of underpants as a weapon against a hungry T. Rex. Finding that Baldrick has forgotten to write dates on the machine's dials, the rest of the film follows their attempts to find their way back to 1999, often creating huge historical anomalies in the process that must be corrected before the end. Rik Mayall appears as Robin Hood, and the film also includes cameo appearances from Kate Moss as Maid Marian and Colin Firth as William Shakespeare.

==== The Big Night In ====
Broadcast in 2020 as part of Children in Need and Comic Relief's joint special The Big Night In during the COVID-19 pandemic, Fry resumed the role of Lord Melchett (an intellectually brilliant version), Head of the Royal Household, under lockdown at Melchett Manor, to help Prince William deal with educating his children via Zoom and discussing Tiger King, before they both step outside to clap for the National Health Service. Melchett is said to be isolating with Lord Blackadder, both grandsons to their First World War counterparts.

=== Live stage performances ===
In 1998, as part of Prince Charles' 50th Birthday Gala televised on ITV, Atkinson appeared as a Restoration Blackadder reading aloud a letter to the Privy Council of King Charles II. He colourfully refuses their invitation to stage a royal gala, calling such occasions "very, very, very dull" and asserting that there was "more musical talent on display when my servant Baldrick breaks wind."

In 2000, on the BBC's annual Royal Variety Performance, Atkinson portrayed Blackadder as a present-day officer in "Her Majesty's Royal Regiment of Shirkers" and delivered a monologue titled "Blackadder: The Army Years", proposing that Britain regain her former greatness by invading (or at least buying) France.

In 2012, as part of the Prince's Trust charity show We Are Most Amused, Atkinson and Robinson reprised their roles as Blackadder and Baldrick in a comedy sketch featuring Miranda Hart as leader of a government inquiry into the recent banking crisis. Blackadder, chief executive of a fictional British bank, appearing with Baldrick as his gardener, convinces the panel to publicly blame the entire crisis on Baldrick, to the latter's consternation.

In October 2026, Atkinson announced he would reprise the role of Blackadder as part of a new West End sketch show, Rowan Live, including other notable past characters.

=== Red Nose Day 2023 ===
Baldrick (Tony Robinson) returned in 2023 for a Red Nose Day sketch for the BBC. Despite speculation, there was no involvement by Rowan Atkinson or a subsequent reboot.

=== Chronological order ===
Title	Type	Production / air date	Set in century
The Black Adder (pilot)	Pilot	1982 (unaired)	16th
The Black Adder	Series	1983	15th
Blackadder II	Series	1986	16th
Blackadder the Third	Series	1987	18th–19th
Blackadder: The Cavalier Years	Comic Relief Special	1988	17th
Children in Need	Special	1988	Unclear (anachronistic)
Clown Court	Special	1988	Unclear (anachronistic)
Blackadder's Christmas Carol	Christmas Special	1988	19th
Woman's Hour Invasion	Radio	1988	20th, Various
Blackadder Goes Forth	Series	1989	20th
Blackadder and the King's Birthday	Sketch	1998	17th
Blackadder: Back & Forth	Millennium Special	1999	20th, Various
Blackadder: The Army Years	Theatre	2000	21st
The Royal Gardener/The Jubilee Girl (for the Party at the Palace)	Sketch	2002	21st
Blackadder Exclusive: The Whole Rotten Saga	Documentary	2008	n/a
Blackadder Rides Again	Documentary	2008	n/a
CEO of Melchett, Melchett and Darling Inquiry	Theatre	2012	21st
The Big Night In	Sketch	2020	21st

== Production ==
=== Series development ===
Rowan Atkinson and Richard Curtis developed the idea for the sitcom while working on Not the Nine O'Clock News. Eager to avoid comparisons to the critically acclaimed Fawlty Towers, they proposed the idea of a historical sitcom. A pilot episode was made in 1982, and a six-episode series was commissioned. The budget for the series was considerable, with much location shooting particularly at Alnwick Castle in Northumberland and the surrounding countryside in February 1983. The series also used large casts of extras, horses and expensive medieval-style costumes. Atkinson has said about the making of the first series:

The first series was odd, it was very extravagant. It cost a million pounds for the six programmes ... [which] was a lot of money to spend ... It looked great, but it wasn't as consistently funny as we would have liked.

Owing to the high cost of the first series, the then-controller of programming of BBC1, Michael Grade, was reluctant to sign off a second series without major improvements to the show and drastic cost-cutting, leaving a gap of three years between the two series.

A chance meeting between Richard Curtis and comedian Ben Elton led to the decision to collaborate on a new series of Blackadder. Recognising the main faults of the first series, Curtis and Elton agreed that Blackadder II would be a studio-only production (along with the inclusion of a live audience during recording, instead of showing the episodes to an audience after taping). Besides adding a greater comedy focus, Elton suggested a major change in character emphasis: Baldrick would become the stupid sidekick, while Edmund Blackadder evolved into a cunning sycophant. This led to the familiar set-up that was maintained in the following series.

Only in the Back & Forth millennium special was the shooting once again on location, because this was a production with a budget estimated at £3 million, and was a joint venture between Tiger Aspect, Sky Television, the New Millennium Experience Company and the BBC, rather than the BBC alone.

=== Casting ===
Each series tended to feature the same set of regular actors in different period settings, although throughout the four series and specials, only Blackadder and Baldrick were constant characters. Several regular cast members recurred as characters with similar names, implying, like Blackadder, that they were descendants.

==== Recurring cast ====
Various actors have appeared in more than one of the Blackadder series and/or specials. These are:

	The Black Adder	Blackadder II	Blackadder the Third	Blackadder Goes Forth	Blackadder: The Cavalier Years	Blackadder's Christmas Carol	Blackadder: Back & Forth
Rowan Atkinson	Yes	Yes	Yes	Yes	Yes	Yes	Yes
Tony Robinson	Yes	Yes	Yes	Yes	Yes	Yes	Yes
Tim McInnerny	Yes	Yes	Yes	Yes			Yes
Hugh Laurie		Yes	Yes	Yes		Yes	Yes
Stephen Fry		Yes	Yes	Yes	Yes	Yes	Yes
Miranda Richardson		Yes	Yes	Yes		Yes	Yes
Rik Mayall	Yes	Yes		Yes			Yes
Miriam Margolyes	Yes	Yes				Yes	
Gabrielle Glaister		Yes		Yes			
Bill Wallis	Yes	Yes		Yes			
Robbie Coltrane			Yes			Yes	
Jim Broadbent	Yes					Yes	
Stephen Frost	Yes			Yes			
Mark Arden	Yes	Yes					
Lee Cornes		Yes	Yes	Yes			
Patsy Byrne		Yes				Yes	Yes
Warren Clarke			Yes		Yes		
Philip Pope		Yes				Yes	
Barbara Miller	Yes	Yes					
David Nunn	Yes					Yes	
Denis Lill			Yes			Yes	

==== Main cast ====
- Rowan Atkinson as Edmund Blackadder, the series' protagonist. In The Black Adder he is Prince Edmund, Duke of Edinburgh, nicknamed "The Black Adder". In Blackadder II he is Edmund, Lord Blackadder, a nobleman in the court of Queen Elizabeth I. In Blackadder the Third he is Mr. Edmund Blackadder Esq., servant to the Prince Regent. In Blackadder's Christmas Carol he is Ebenezer Blackadder, the Victorian proprietor of a "moustache shop". In Blackadder Goes Forth he is Captain Edmund Blackadder, serving in World War I. In Blackadder: Back & Forth he is Lord Edmund Blackadder, a modern-day representative of the Blackadder dynasty.
- Tony Robinson as S. Baldrick, Blackadder's servant, or batman/orderly in Blackadder Goes Forth, who appears in all four series and all the specials.
- Tim McInnerny as Lord Percy Percy, Blackadder's dimwitted sidekick in The Black Adder and Blackadder II—initially the Duke of Northumberland in the former, then heir to the same title in the latter—and as Captain Kevin Darling, Blackadder's antagonistic rival, in Blackadder Goes Forth. He also appeared as The Scarlet Pimpernel (alias Lord Topper and Le Comte de Frou Frou) in the Blackadder the Third episode "Nob and Nobility", and reprised his role as Darling in Back & Forth.
- Stephen Fry as Melchett in Blackadder II and Blackadder Goes Forth. In Blackadder II he is Lord Melchett, the sycophantic adviser to Queen Elizabeth I. Fry also played this incarnation of Melchett in Blackadder's Christmas Carol. In Blackadder Goes Forth he is General Melchett, a blustering buffoon and presumed descendant. Fry also appeared as Arthur Wellesley, 1st Duke of Wellington, in "Duel and Duality", the final episode of Blackadder the Third, and as various characters in Back & Forth.
- Hugh Laurie as George, first the Prince Regent in Blackadder the Third, and later Lieutenant George in Blackadder Goes Forth. Laurie also played the Prince Regent in Blackadder's Christmas Carol. Prior to becoming a regular cast member, Laurie also appeared in two episodes of Blackadder II; first as Simon "Farters Parters" Partridge or "Mr. Ostrich" in the episode "Beer", and then as Prince Ludwig the Indestructible in "Chains", the final episode of Blackadder II. He reprised his role as George in Back & Forth.
- Miranda Richardson was only a regular cast member for Blackadder II, in which she played Queen Elizabeth I, reprising the role in Blackadder's Christmas Carol and Back & Forth, alongside additional characters. However, she also played significant one-off roles as Amy Hardwood (a.k.a. The Shadow) in "Amy and Amiability" from Blackadder the Third, and Mary Fletcher-Brown, a dutiful nurse in "General Hospital" from Blackadder Goes Forth.

==== Non-recurring cast ====
- Brian Blessed, Elspet Gray and Robert East appeared in all six episodes of The Black Adder as the Black Adder's father (King Richard IV), mother (Queen Gertrude) and brother (Prince Harry), respectively. Gray had also appeared in the non-broadcast pilot.
- Patsy Byrne played Nursie in all six episodes of Blackadder II, but never featured in either of the subsequent series, either as a regular character or one-off. She briefly reprised the character in Blackadder's Christmas Carol and Back & Forth.
- Helen Atkinson-Wood played the role of Mrs. Miggins in all six episodes of Blackadder the Third, but did not appear again in the series, although the character was mentioned several times in Blackadder II and in the final episode of Blackadder Goes Forth.

==== Guest cast ====
Ben Elton's arrival, from Blackadder II onwards, heralded the more frequent recruitment of comic actors from the alternative comedy era for guest appearances, including Robbie Coltrane, Rik Mayall (who had appeared in the final episode of The Black Adder as "Mad Gerald"), Adrian Edmondson, Nigel Planer, Mark Arden, Stephen Frost, Chris Barrie, Jim Sweeney, Steve Steen and Jeremy Hardy. Elton himself played an anarchist in Blackadder the Third.

Gabrielle Glaister played Bob, a young woman who poses as a man, in both Blackadder II and Blackadder Goes Forth, where in the latter her official title is Driver Parkhurst. One episode each of Blackadder II and Blackadder Goes Forth feature Rik Mayall as Lord Flashheart, a vulgar friend in his first appearance and then a successful rival of Blackadder in his second. He also played a decidedly Flashheart-like Robin Hood in Back & Forth. Lee Cornes appeared in one episode each of the Curtis/Elton-written series; as a guard in the Blackadder II episode "Chains"; as the poet Shelley in the Blackadder the Third episode "Ink and Incapability"; and as firing squad soldier Private Fraser in the Blackadder Goes Forth episode "Corporal Punishment".

More established actors, some at the veteran stage of their careers, were also recruited for roles. These included Peter Cook, Alex Norton, Jim Broadbent, Frank Finlay, Valentine Dyall, John Grillo, Simon Jones, Tom Baker, Ronald Lacey, Roger Blake, Denis Lill, Hugh Paddick, Kenneth Connor, Warren Clarke and Geoffrey Palmer, who played Field Marshal Sir Douglas Haig in "Goodbyeee", the final episode of Blackadder Goes Forth. Bill Wallis and Miriam Margolyes each played three different guest roles: Wallis played Sir Justin de Boinod in "The Archbishop" (The Black Adder), Mr. Ploppy in "Head" (Blackadder II), and Brigadier Sir Bernard Proudfoot Smith in "General Hospital" (Blackadder Goes Forth), while Margolyes played The Spanish Infanta in "The Queen of Spain's Beard" (The Black Adder), Lady Whiteadder in "Beer" (Blackadder II), and Queen Victoria in Blackadder's Christmas Carol. Patrick Allen provided narration for all six episodes of The Black Adder, and appeared as "The Hawk" in the last episode, "The Black Seal". Two episodes of The Black Adder feature Natasha King as Princess Leia of Hungary, while the second episode, "Born to Be King", features a brief, early screen appearance of Angus Deayton.

Unusually for a sitcom based loosely on factual events and in the historical past, a man was recruited for one episode essentially to play himself. Political commentator Vincent Hanna played a character billed as "his own great-great-great grandfather" in the Blackadder the Third episode "Dish and Dishonesty". Hanna was asked to take part because the scene was of a by-election in which Baldrick was a candidate and, in the style of modern television, Hanna gave a long-running "live" commentary of events at the count (and interviewed candidates and election agents) to a crowd through the town hall window.

=== Theme tune ===
Howard Goodall's theme tune has the same melody throughout all the series, but is played in roughly the style of the period in which it is set. It is performed mostly with trumpets and timpani in The Black Adder, the fanfares used suggesting typical medieval court fanfares; with a combination of recorder, string quartet and electric guitar in Blackadder II (the end theme, with different lyrics each time reflecting on the episode's events, was sung by a countertenor); on oboe, cello and harpsichord (in the style of a minuet) for Blackadder the Third; by The Band of the 3rd Battalion, Royal Anglian Regiment in Blackadder Goes Forth; sung by carol singers in Blackadder's Christmas Carol; and by an orchestra in Blackadder: The Cavalier Years and Blackadder: Back & Forth.

== Awards ==
In 2000, the fourth series, Blackadder Goes Forth, ranked at 16 in the "100 Greatest British Television Programmes", a list created by the British Film Institute. In a 2004, BBC TV poll for "Britain's Best Sitcom", Blackadder was voted the second-best British sitcom of all time, beaten only by Only Fools and Horses. It was also ranked as the 20th Best TV Show of All Time by Empire magazine.

== Future ==
Despite regular statements denying any plans for a fifth series, cast members are regularly asked about the possibility of a new series.

In January 2005, Tony Robinson told ITV's This Morning that Rowan Atkinson was more keen than he has been in the past to do a fifth series, set in the 1960s (centred on a rock band called the "Black Adder Five", with Baldrick – a.k.a. 'Bald Rick' – as the drummer). In the documentary Blackadder Rides Again, Robinson stated that the series would present Blackadder as the bastard son of Queen Elizabeth II and running a Beatles-like rock band. Rowan Atkinson, Tony Robinson, Hugh Laurie, Stephen Fry, Tim McInnerny and Miranda Richardson would have reprised their roles, and reportedly, Brian Blessed, Elspet Gray and Robert East would have returned from the first series to play Blackadder's biological family. Robinson again mentioned this idea during an on-stage interview in 2007, but in the context of a film.

Richard Curtis at one stage suggested the idea that Baldrick had accidentally assassinated John F. Kennedy.

Aside from a brief mention in June 2005,, there have been no announcements from the BBC that a new series is being planned. Moreover, in November 2005, Rowan Atkinson told BBC Breakfast that, although he would very much like to do a new series set in Colditz or another prisoner-of-war camp during World War II, something which both he and Stephen Fry reiterated at the end of Blackadder Rides Again, the chances of it happening are extremely slim.

Nevertheless, ideas had been floated for a fifth series. Batadder was intended to be a parody of Batman with Baldrick as the counterpart of Robin (suggested by John Lloyd). This idea eventually came to surface as part of the Comic Relief sketch "Spider-Plant Man" in 2005, with Atkinson as the title hero, Robinson as Robin, Jim Broadbent as Batman and Rachel Stevens as Mary Jane. Star Adder, suggested by Atkinson, would have been set in space in the future.

On 10 April 2007, Hello! reported that Atkinson was moving forward with his ideas for a fifth series. He said, "I like the idea of him being a prisoner of war in Colditz. That would have the right level of authority and hierarchy which is apparent in all the Blackadders."

Stephen Fry has expressed the view that, since the series went out on such a good "high", a film might not be a good idea.

During his June 2007 stage performance, chronicled on the Tony Robinson's Cunning Night Out DVD, Robinson states that, after filming the Back & Forth special, the general idea was to reunite for another special in 2010. Robinson jokingly remarked that Hugh Laurie's success on House may make that difficult.

On 28 November 2012, Rowan Atkinson reprised the role at the "We are most amused" comedy gala for the Prince's Trust at the Royal Albert Hall. He was joined by Tony Robinson as Baldrick. The sketch involved Blackadder as CEO of Melchett, Melchett and Darling bank facing an enquiry over the banking crisis.

In August 2015, Tony Robinson said in an interview "I do think a new series of Blackadder is on the cards. I have spoken to virtually all the cast about this now. The only problem is Hugh [Laurie]'s fee. He's a huge star now." However, in October 2018, Richard Curtis "dashed hopes" that the show would return for a fifth series.

In April 2017 at the BFI & Radio Times Television Festival, Atkinson stated "There are no plans to do anything" and revealed a potential Russian Revolution themed series that never materialised:

"There was a plan twenty years ago that got nowhere which was called Redadder which I quite liked. It was set in Russia in 1917 and Blackadder and Baldrick were working for the Tsar. They had blue stripes around their caps and then the Revolution happened and Rik Mayall unsurprisingly was playing Rasputin."

In December 2020, Rowan Atkinson told the Radio Times:

"I don't actually like the process of making anything – with the possible exception of Blackadder. Because the responsibility for making that series funny was on many shoulders, not just mine. Blackadder represented the creative energy we all had in the '80s. To try to replicate that 30 years on wouldn't be easy."

Most recently, in December 2024, Ben Elton poured doubt on a fifth series of Blackadder:

"But there will not be a fifth series of Blackadder, I think that’s pretty much a certainty. I have no interest in doing it. I don’t think any of us do, with the possible exception of Tony [Robinson]. But if we did, the world would be our oyster. We could have fun with any period."

== Home media ==
All series and many of the specials are available on VHS tapes, DVDs & Blu-rays. Many are also available on BBC audio cassette. As of 2008, a "Best of BBC" edition box set is available containing all four series together with Blackadder's Christmas Carol and Back & Forth. All four series and the Christmas special are also available for download on iTunes.

=== VHS releases ===
On 5 February 1990, BBC Enterprises Ltd released the first series on two single VHS tapes.

VHS video title	Date of release	Episodes	BBFC rating
The Blackadder: The Foretelling (BBCV 4300)	5 February 1990	The Foretelling, Born to Be King, the Archbishop	PG
The Blackadder: The Queen of Spain's Beard (BBCV 4301)	5 February 1990	The Queen of Spain's Beard, Witchsmeller Pursuivant, The Black Seal	15

On 2 October 1989, BBC Enterprises Ltd released the second series on two single VHS tapes.

VHS video title	Date of release	Episodes	BBFC rating
Blackadder II: Parte the Firste (BBCV 4288)	2 October 1989	Bells, Head, Potato	PG
Blackadder II: Parte the Seconde (BBCV 4289)	2 October 1989	Money, Beer, Chains	15

On 6 June 1988, 7 November 1988, and 6 February 1989, BBC Enterprises Ltd released the third series on two single VHS tapes.

VHS video title	Date of release	Episodes	BBFC rating
Blackadder The Third: Sense and Senility (BBCV 4143)	6 June 1988	Sense and Senility, Amy and Amibility, Duel and Duality	15
Blackadder The Third: Dish and Dishonesty (BBCV 4175)	7 November 1988, and 6 February 1989	Dish and Dishonesty, Ink and Incapability, Nob and Nobility	PG
Blackadder The Third: Sense and Senility (BBCV 4176)	7 November 1988, and 6 February 1989	Sense and Senility, Amy and Amibility, Duel and Duality	15

On 10 September 1990, BBC Enterprises Ltd released the fourth and final series on two single VHS tapes.

VHS video title	Date of release	Episodes	BBFC rating
Blackadder Goes Forth: Captain Cook (BBCV 4349)	10 September 1990	Captain Cook, Corporal Punishment, Major Star	PG
Blackadder Goes Forth: Private Plane (BBCV 4350)	10 September 1990	Private Plane, General Hospital, Goodbyeee	15

On 7 September 1992, all eight single Blackadder VHS tapes were re-released as four double VHS sets. These four double sets were re-released as single VHS tapes on 2 October 1995 and again as double sets on 2 November 1998.

VHS video title	Date of release/Cat No. (Double VHS)	Date of release/Cat No. (Single VHS)	Episodes	BBFC rating
The Blackadder – The Complete Entire Historic First Series	7 September 1992 and 2 November 1998 (both BBCV 4782)	2 October 1995 (BBCV 5711)	The Foretelling, Born to Be King, the Archbishop, The Queen of Spain's Beard, Witchsmeller Pursuivant, The Black Seal	15
Blackadder II – The Complete Entire Historic Second Series	7 September 1992 and 2 November 1998 (both BBCV 4785)	2 October 1995 (BBCV 5712)	Bells, Head, Potato, Money, Beer, Chains	15
Blackadder the Third – The Complete Entire Historic Third Series	7 September 1992 and 2 November 1998 (both BBCV 4786)	2 October 1995 (BBCV 5713)	Dish and Dishonesty, Ink and Incapability, Nob and Nobility, Sense and Senility, Amy and Amibility, Duel and Duality	15
Blackadder Goes Forth – The Complete Entire Historic Fourth Series	7 September 1992 and 2 November 1998 (both BBCV 4787)	2 October 1995 (BBCV 5714)	Captain Cook, Corporal Punishment, Major Star, Private Plane, General Hospital, Goodbyeee	15

On 5 January 1998, five episodes of the first two series were released on a 15-rated VHS tape by BBC Worldwide Ltd.

VHS video title	Date of release	Episodes
The Very Best of Blackadder (BBCV 6360)	5 January 1998	The Archbishop, The Queen of Spain's Beard, Bells, Head, Chains

On 4 November 1991, Blackadder's Christmas Carol was released on a single VHS tape release rated PG (Cat. No. BBCV 4646).

=== Single DVD releases ===
DVD title	Region 1	Region 2	Region 4
Series 1: The Black Adder	26 June 2001	1 November 1999	29 November 1999
Series 2: Blackadder II	26 June 2001	6 November 2000	11 July 2001
Series 3: Blackadder the Third	26 June 2001	5 February 2001	3 October 2001
Series 4: Blackadder Goes Forth	26 June 2001	22 October 2001	28 February 2002
Blackadder's Christmas Carol	26 June 2001	18 November 2002	4 November 2002
Blackadder: Back & Forth	26 June 2001	15 September 2003	11 November 2004

=== Box set DVD releases ===
DVD title	DVD content	Region 1	Region 2	Region 4
The Complete Blackadder – All Four Series	The Black Adder; Blackadder II; Blackadder the Third; Blackadder Goes Forth	—N/a	12 November 2001	3 October 2002
Blackadder – The Complete Collection	The Black Adder; Blackadder II; Blackadder the Third; Blackadder Goes Forth; Blackadder's Christmas Carol; Blackadder: Back & Forth; Blackadder: The Cavalier Years	26 June 2001	3 October 2005	—N/a
Blackadder Remastered – The Ultimate Edition	The Black Adder (Remastered); Blackadder II (Remastered); Blackadder the Third (Remastered); Blackadder Goes Forth (Remastered); Blackadder's Christmas Carol (Remastered); Blackadder: Back & Forth (Remastered); Blackadder: The Cavalier Years (Remastered); Blackadder Rides Again (Documentary) +Audio Commentaries +Interviews	20 October 2009	15 June 2009	1 October 2009

== LP box set ==
On 19 October 2022, there was an announcement that there would be an LP box set release collecting the Blackadder soundtracks on vinyl for the first time. The deluxe 12-disc LP collection, titled Blackadder's Historical Record, was pressed on gold-coloured 140g vinyl, and released on 10 February 2023 by Demon Records. It includes a frameable print of Baldrick, signed by Sir Tony Robinson, and a booklet detailing the comedy series, and is housed inside a "leather-look rigid box"

== Stamps ==
Royal Mail issued a set of special stamps celebrating Blackadder on 17 May 2023.

== Literature ==
- Richard Curtis, Ben Elton, and Rowan Atkinson, Blackadder: The Whole Damn Dynasty 1485–1917 (Michael Joseph, 1998). ISBN 0-7181-4372-8. Being the – almost – complete scripts of the four regular series.
- Chris Howarth, and Steve Lyons, Cunning: The Blackadder Programme Guide (Virgin Publishing, 2002). ISBN 0-7535-0447-2. A cheap unofficial episode guide.
- Richard Curtis and Ben Elton, Blackadder: Back & Forth (Penguin Books, 2000). ISBN 0-14-029135-0. A script book with copious photographs from the most recent outing, and additional material from Kevin Cecil & Andy Riley.
- J.F. Roberts, The True History of the Black Adder: The Unadulterated Tale of the Creation of a Comedy Legend (Preface publishing, 2012). ISBN 978-1-84809-346-1. A 420-page officially endorsed full history of the Blackadder episodes and characters, as well as its birth, its writers and actors, and all the specials – plus Curtis' script for unproduced Christmas special 'Blackadder In Bethlehem'.
