= Blackadder: The Cavalier Years =

- Title screen of Blackadder: The Cavalier Years
- Genre: Period, sitcom
- Written by: Richard Curtis; Ben Elton
- Directed by: Mandie Fletcher
- Starring: Rowan Atkinson; Tony Robinson; Stephen Fry; Warren Clarke
- Narrated by: Harry Enfield
- Theme music composer: Howard Goodall
- Country of origin: United Kingdom
- Original language: English

Production
- Producer: John Lloyd
- Camera setup: Multi-camera
- Running time: 15 minutes

Original release
- Network: BBC1
- Release: 5 February 1988

Related
- Blackadder the Third; Blackadder's Christmas Carol

Blackadder: The Cavalier Years is a 15-minute one-off edition of Blackadder set during the English Civil War, shown as part of the first Comic Relief Red Nose Day on BBC1, broadcast on Friday 5 February 1988. The show featured Warren Clarke as a guest star.

== Plot ==
Royalist Sir Edmund Blackadder provides refuge to the King Charles I of England following his defeat in the English Civil War, fearing for his own survival and the spread of Puritanism. Oliver Cromwell and the Roundheads suddenly arrive at Blackadder Hall during Edmund's brief absence. Edmund's servant, Baldrick, accidentally reveals Charles' presence. Two weeks later, at the Tower of London, King Charles is informed that he has been sentenced to death. In disguise, Edmund tells Charles that he plans to help him escape.

As King Charles' execution approaches, Edmund assures the King that Parliament won't find a willing executioner, but they are suddenly told that one has been found. At Blackadder Hall, Edmund ponders who could behead Charles, and questions Baldrick into admitting that it is him. Baldrick tells Edmund that he plans to fake the execution using a pumpkin. Edmund chastises Baldrick, takes his £1000 wage, and announces that he will take Baldrick's place.

On the day of Charles' execution, Edmund, dressed as the executioner, takes the King's remaining wealth. However, Charles recognizes him, misjudges Edmund's intentions, and thanks him for his help while also giving Edmund custody of his infant son. Edmund panics and uses Baldrick's plan, which fails to fool the crowd. Edmund apologizes, says he will try again, and successfully beheads the King.

Edmund and Baldrick return to Blackadder Hall. Disgusted by his actions, Edmund cradles Charles' son. Baldrick tries to console him by saying that the future of the British monarchy lies in his hands. He then suggests that Edmund flee to France to escape persecution by the Roundheads. Edmund rises from his seat but finds the Roundheads are already there, demanding his surrender. Sir Edmund tells Baldrick that a man of honour should die in defence of his future sovereign before suddenly disguising himself as a Roundhead. Cromwell enters the room, denounces Baldrick as a Royalist, and draws his sword.

== Cast ==
- Rowan Atkinson as Sir Edmund Blackadder
- Tony Robinson as Baldrick, Esquire
- Stephen Fry as King Charles I
- Warren Clarke as Oliver Cromwell
- Harry Enfield as the narrator

== Production ==
"Blackadder: The Cavalier Years" was recorded on 10 January 1988.

Fry based his interpretation of King Charles on the then Prince of Wales, but now King Charles III. In series chronology, this episode takes place between the second and third series of the show, although it was produced after the third series had aired. The kitchen set is a redress of the servants' quarters from the third series. A behind the scenes studio tape was found in 2019 and was released by Kaleidoscope on their YouTube channel.
