= Gone to the Dogs (TV series) =

- Genre: Comedy drama
- Written by: Tony Grounds
- Directed by: Tony Dow; Sandy Johnson
- Starring: Alison Steadman; Jim Broadbent; Harry Enfield; Warren Clarke
- Music by: The Gutter Brothers
- Country of origin: United Kingdom
- Original language: English
- No. of series: 1
- No. of episodes: 6

Production
- Producer: Michele Buck
- Running time: 50 minutes
- Production company: Central Films

Original release
- Network: ITV
- Release: 29 November – 27 December 1991

Related
- Gone to Seed

Gone to the Dogs is a television miniseries by Central Films for Central Independent Television bought from writer Will Warrior, and was broadcast by ITV between 29 November and 27 December 1991 in the United Kingdom. The six-episode comedy drama series revolved around the relationship of Jim Morley (Jim Broadbent) and Lauren Patterson (Alison Steadman) in the world of greyhound racing. The series had a notable cast and much of the greyhound racing filming took place at Walthamstow Stadium.

The series was followed by Gone to Seed where several members of the cast from this series also appear, albeit in entirely new roles.

== Cast ==
=== Main ===
- Alison Steadman as Lauren Patterson
- Jim Broadbent as Jim Morley
- Harry Enfield as Little Jim Morley
- Warren Clarke as Larry Patterson

=== Recurring ===
- Martin Clunes as Pilbeam
- Sheila Hancock as Jean
- Julia St John as Sophie
- Cliff Parisi as Stanley
- Rosemary Martin as Margaret
- Arthur Whybrow as George
- Barbara Keogh as Betty
- Paddy Joyce as Quinn
- Lisa Jacobs as Maid
- Walter Sparrow as Stretch

=== Guest ===
- Bobby Moore
- Martin Peters
- Geoff Hurst
- Michelle Collins
- Donna Ewin

== Episodes ==
No.	Title	Original release date
1	"Episode 1"	29 November 1991
2	"Episode 2"	6 December 1991
3	"Episode 3"	13 December 1991
4	"Episode 4"	20 December 1991
5	"Episode 5"	27 December 1991
6	"Episode 6"	27 December 1991

== Home media ==
The complete series was originally released on VHS on 4 November 1991 by the Video Collection and Central Video. It was released on DVD in a three disc boxset along with its follow up series Gone to Seed, by Network on 27 February 2012.
