= The Black Adder =

First series of the BBC sitcom Blackadder

- Title screen, showing Alnwick Castle in Northumberland, a main location for the series.
- Written by: Richard Curtis; Rowan Atkinson
- Directed by: Martin Shardlow
- Starring: Rowan Atkinson; Tony Robinson; Tim McInnerny; Brian Blessed; Elspet Gray; Robert East
- Narrated by: Patrick Allen
- Theme music composer: Howard Goodall
- Countries of origin: United Kingdom; Australia
- Original language: English
- No. of episodes: 6

Production
- Producer: John Lloyd
- Running time: 33 minutes (approx)
- Production companies: BBC; Seven Network

Original release
- Network: BBC1
- Release: 15 June – 20 July 1983

Related
- Unaired pilot Blackadder II

The Black Adder is the first series of the BBC sitcom Blackadder, written by Richard Curtis and Rowan Atkinson, directed by Martin Shardlow and produced by John Lloyd. The series was originally aired on BBC1 from 15 June 1983 to 20 July 1983, and was a joint production with the Australian Seven Network. Set in 1485 at the end of the British Middle Ages, the series is written as a secret history which contends that King Richard III won the Battle of Bosworth Field, only to be unintentionally assassinated by his nephew's son Edmund and succeeded by said nephew, Richard IV, one of the Princes in the Tower. The series follows the exploits of Richard IV's unfavoured second son Edmund (who calls himself "The Black Adder") in his various attempts to increase his standing with his father and, in the final episode, his quest to overthrow him.

Conceived while Atkinson and Curtis were working on Not the Nine O'Clock News, the series presents medieval issues in Britain in a humorous and often anachronistic manner—witchcraft, royal succession, European relations, the Crusades and the conflict between the Crown and the Church. The filming of the series was ambitious, as it featured a large cast and required extensive location shooting. Shakespearean dialogue is sometimes adapted for comic effect. Despite winning an International Emmy, The Black Adder is regarded by its creators and most critics as the weakest Blackadder series. Although BBC renewed the programme, it was significantly re-tooled and had its budget drastically reduced for subsequent installments.

A second series, Blackadder II, aired in 1986.

== Plot ==
Set in the Middle Ages, the series is written as an alternative history. It opens on 21 August 1485, the eve of the Battle of Bosworth Field, which in the series is won not by Henry Tudor (as in reality) but by Richard III. Richard III, played by Peter Cook, is presented as a good king who doted on his nephews, contrary to the Shakespearean view of him as a hunchbacked, infanticidal monster.

After his victory in the battle, Richard III is unintentionally killed by Lord Edmund Plantagenet; Richard attempts to take Edmund's horse, which he was only borrowing for losing his own steed. Not recognizing the king, Edmund thinks Richard is stealing it and cuts his head off. The late King's nephew, Richard, Duke of York (played by Brian Blessed) who is Lord Edmund Plantagenet's father, is then crowned as Richard IV. Lord Edmund himself did not take part in the battle after arriving late, but later claims to have killed 450 peasants and several nobles, one of whom had actually been killed by his brother in the battle.

King Richard IV of England and XII of Scotland and his Queen Gertrude of Flanders have two sons: Harry, Prince of Wales and his younger brother Prince Edmund. Though Harry is by far their father's favourite, the King barely acknowledging his second son's existence, he is often depicted as simple-minded and easy to fool unlike Edmund, though he still treats Edmund with kindness and respect. It is a running gag throughout the series that Edmund's father cannot even remember his name, mostly misremembering it as different names – Edward, Enid, Edgar and so on. However, despite his mostly dismissive attitude toward his second son, the King actually loves Edmund very dearly, partially due to their father-son relationship; in the third episode, when Edmund becomes the Archbishop of Canterbury and helps his father to secure some land from a dying noble before the church can, the King proudly acknowledges Edmund as his son, embraces him and even mentions to the Queen that Edmund has "turned out well", and in the series' finale, on Edmund's deathbed, the King does his best to console him, assuring him that his soul will go to Heaven, and has the entire court drink a toast in his honour.

Using this premise, the series follows the fictitious reign of Richard IV (1485–1498) through the experiences of Prince Edmund, who styles himself as "The Black Adder", and his two sidekicks: the imbecilic Lord Percy Percy, the Duke of Northumberland (Tim McInnerny); and Baldrick (Tony Robinson), a more intelligent servant who Edmund takes on as his squire.

By the end of the series, events converge with accepted history. King Richard IV and his entire family are accidentally killed with wine poisoned by Percy meant for the Black Seal who had actually arrived to overthrow Richard IV. The entire Black Seal are killed with the poison. Percy and Baldrick celebrate then hear Edmund screaming in pain. It cuts to Edmund on his deathbed, where Baldrick learns Percy poisoned the whole vat, they race to save the family as they all drink the poisoned wine killing them. Blackadder recovers enough to claim he is now King of England, then drinks the wine and dies. After the credits Percy and Baldrick shout don't drink the wine, realising they are dead. In reality, Richard, Duke of York, one of the Princes in the Tower, was only twelve years old (and perhaps two years dead) when the Battle of Bosworth Field took place in 1485, and thus too young to have had two adult sons. Henry Tudor seemingly also falsified the history of Scotland and Ireland: Richard IV is said to be king of England, Scotland and Ireland, and Prince Edmund has the title of Duke of Edinburgh, whereas in reality Ireland was not a kingdom until 1542 and Scotland continued to have a separate royal house until 1603.

== Episodes ==
The episodes in this series, written by Rowan Atkinson and Richard Curtis, were originally shown on BBC1 on Wednesday evenings, 21:25–22:00. Each episode ran for roughly 33 minutes. The series began on 15 June 1983.

Each of the episodes was based on a medieval theme – the Wars of the Roses, the Crusades and royal succession, the conflict between the Crown and the Church, arranged marriages between monarchies, the Plague and witchcraft, and a planned coup d'état in the final episode.

The series was broadcast shortly after the BBC Television Shakespeare productions of Shakespeare's four plays about the Wars of the Roses: the three-part Henry VI plays, followed by Richard III, which was first shown on 23 January 1983. Some of the same actors were used to enhance the parody of Shakespearean history. Ron Cook, who played Richard III in the Shakespeare productions, is cast as the villainous "Sean the Irish Bastard". Peter Benson, who played Shakespeare's Henry VI, played Henry VII in the first episode.

No. overall	No. in series	Title	Directed by	Written by	Original release date
1	1	"The Foretelling"	Martin Shardlow	Richard Curtis & Rowan Atkinson	15 June 1983
As the Wars of the Roses reach their climax, Edmund arrives late for battle and accidentally kills the King and becomes a prince when Richard IV becomes king. With the ghost of Richard III haunting Edmund's every waking moment, he must do his best to keep it a secret, until three wise women give Edmund some seemingly fantastic news. Guest starring Peter Cook as King Richard III.
2	2	"Born to Be King"	Martin Shardlow	Richard Curtis & Rowan Atkinson	22 June 1983
Edmund plots revenge when Dougal McAngus, the King's Supreme Commander, arrives and is given Edmund's lands by Harry acting as Regent. Edmund decides to kill McAngus in a play, but discovers that McAngus has secrets about Edmund's mother which could make Edmund king.
3	3	"The Archbishop"	Martin Shardlow	Richard Curtis & Rowan Atkinson	29 June 1983
King Richard announces that he will make his son Archbishop of Canterbury. Edmund discovers that if his brother Harry becomes the archbishop, he will be killed and Edmund will become king. Unfortunately, the King appoints Edmund as Archbishop, then unintentionally sends two knights to kill him.
4	4	"The Queen of Spain's Beard"	Martin Shardlow	Richard Curtis & Rowan Atkinson	6 July 1983
Edmund thinks he is marrying a beautiful princess, but discovers that his future bride is an ugly Spanish Infanta. With the help of Baldrick and Percy, Edmund strives to stop the wedding.
5	5	"Witchsmeller Pursuivant"	Martin Shardlow	Richard Curtis & Rowan Atkinson	13 July 1983
After a witch test goes wrong, Edmund is accused of being a witch, and the witchsmeller does everything to make everyone believe Edmund really is a witch. Guest starring Frank Finlay as The Witchsmeller.
6	6	"The Black Seal"	Martin Shardlow	Richard Curtis & Rowan Atkinson	20 July 1983
When all of Edmund's titles are removed except Warden of the Royal Privies, he is furious and decides to raise an army of six of the most ruthless bandits in all the lands to seize the throne and become king. Featuring Patrick Allen (who also narrated the series) as Phillip of Burgundy.

=== Character development ===
In this series, the character of the Black Adder is somewhat different from later incarnations, being largely unintelligent, naive, and snivelling. The character does evolve through the series, however, and he begins showing signs of what his descendants will be like by the final episode, where he begins insulting everyone around him and making his own plans. This evolution follows naturally from the character's situation. "The Black Adder" is the title that Edmund adopts during the first episode (after first considering "The Black Vegetable"). Presumably one of his descendants adopted it as a surname before Blackadder II, in which the title character becomes "Edmund Blackadder". Furthermore, Baldrick is shown in more favourable and intelligent light here than in subsequent series – his 'cunning plans' are typically superior to and more workable than Edmund's own. Starting from the second series, the characters' relative intelligence and naiveté clearly switch.

== Production ==
=== Development ===
Rowan Atkinson and Richard Curtis developed the idea for the sitcom while working on Not the Nine O'Clock News. Eager to avoid comparisons to the critically acclaimed Fawlty Towers, they proposed the idea of a historical sitcom. An unaired pilot episode was made in 1982, and a six-episode series was commissioned.

In the unaired pilot episode, covering the basic plot of "Born to Be King", Rowan Atkinson speaks, dresses and generally looks and acts like the later Blackadder descendants of the second series onwards, but no reason is given as to why he was instead changed to a snivelling wretch for the first series. Richard Curtis has stated he cannot remember the exact reason, but has suggested it was because they wanted to have a more complicated character (implying that the change was driven by the writing) instead of a swaggering lead from the pilot.

Curtis admitted in a 2004 documentary that just before recording began, producer John Lloyd came up to him with Atkinson and asked what Edmund's character was. Curtis then realised that, despite writing some funny lines, he had no idea how Rowan Atkinson was supposed to play his part. On the 25th anniversary documentary Blackadder Rides Again, Atkinson added that as the cameras were about to roll for the first time, he suddenly realised he wasn't even sure what voice to use for the character.

=== Filming ===
The series featured elaborate location shooting outside Alnwick Castle in Northumberland with horses, medieval-style costumes and a large cast of extras. In this scene from the opening of the episode "Born to Be King", King Richard IV rides off to the Crusades, leaving Blackadder, Baldrick and Percy (front right) to plan a way to gain power.

The budget for the series was considerable, with much location shooting particularly at Alnwick Castle in Northumberland and the surrounding countryside in February 1983. Brinkburn Priory, an authentic reconstruction of a medieval monastery church, was used for the episode "The Archbishop". The series also used large casts of extras, as well as horses and expensive medieval-style costumes. Filming at the castle was hindered by bad weather – snow is visible in many of the outdoor location shots.

For the duration of the production, Atkinson endured having his hair trimmed in an unflattering medieval style and wearing a selection of "priapic codpieces". Atkinson has said about the making of the first series:

The first series was odd, it was very extravagant. It cost a million pounds for the six programmes ... [which] was a lot of money to spend ... It looked great, but it wasn't as consistently funny as we would have liked.

=== Cast ===
Character	Pilot	TV series
Edmund, Duke of Edinburgh	Rowan Atkinson	Rowan Atkinson
King Richard IV of England	John Savident	Brian Blessed
Gertrude, Queen of Flanders	Elspet Gray	Elspet Gray
Harry, Prince of Wales	Robert Bathurst	Robert East
Percy, Duke of Northumberland	Tim McInnerny	Tim McInnerny
Baldrick, Son of Robin the Dung Gatherer	Philip Fox	Tony Robinson

Robinson said in 2003 that he was originally flattered to be offered a part and it was only later he found that other small-part actors had also been offered the role and turned it down. The series guest-starred noted actors including Peter Cook and Peter Benson in "The Foretelling"; Miriam Margolyes and Jim Broadbent in "The Queen of Spain's Beard"; Frank Finlay in "Witchsmeller Pursuivant"; and Rik Mayall and Patrick Allen (who also narrated the series) in "The Black Seal".

=== Title sequence and music ===
The title sequence included stock shots of Edmund riding his horse on location, interspersed with shots of him doing silly things (and, usually, a shot of King Richard IV to go with Brian Blessed's credit). The closing titles were a similar sequence of Edmund riding, eventually falling off his horse, after which the camera continues following the horse as it goes on running. All the credits of the first series featured eccentric orderings of the cast list (such as "order of precedence", "order of witchiness" and "order of disappearance") and included "with additional dialogue by William Shakespeare" and "made in glorious television".

The series used the first incarnation of the Blackadder theme by Howard Goodall (with the exception of the unaired pilot, which featured a different arrangement). For the opening theme, a trumpet solo accompanied by an orchestra was used. For the end titles, the theme gained mock-heroic lyrics sung by a baritone (Simon Carrington, a member of the King's Singers). In the final episode, the theme was sung with altered lyrics by a treble, in a more reflective style. The series' incidental music was unusually performed by pipe organ and percussion.

== Awards and criticism ==
The series won an International Emmy award in the popular arts category in 1983. The four series of Blackadder were voted into second place in the BBC's Britain's Best Sitcom in 2004 with 282,106 votes, although the series' advocate, John Sergeant, was not complimentary of the first series, suggesting it was "grandiose, confused and expensive".

Members of the cast and crew, looking back for the documentary Blackadder Rides Again, are also not particularly complimentary of the first series. John Lloyd recalls that a colleague commented at the time that the series "looks a million dollars, but cost a million pounds", although he admits that they were proud of the result at the time. Due to the high cost of the first series, the controller of BBC1 when the second series was commissioned, Michael Grade, was reluctant to authorise a second series without major cost-cutting, leaving a gap of three years before Blackadder II was broadcast, on the condition that it remained largely studio-bound.

== Releases ==
The complete series of The Black Adder is available as a Region 2 DVD from BBC Worldwide, as well as in a complete box set with the other series. The series is also available in Region 1 DVD in a box set of the complete series. "The Complete Collected Series 1, 2, 3, 4 and Specials", a 15-disc complete set of audiobooks published by BBC Audiobooks Ltd, was released in 2009. A selection of one-off episodes, documentaries and other appearances by "Blackadder" are featured, with some of this extra material being released on audio for the first time.

In December 2023 The Black Adder was released on Blu Ray as part of a 'Complete Collection' of all four series (plus specials and extras). All episodes have apparently been restored and remastered along with being upscaled.

=== VHS releases ===
On 5 February 1990, BBC Enterprises Ltd released all 6 episodes of The Black Adder on two single videos and on 7 September 1992 all 6 episodes of The Blackadder were re-released on 'Complete' double VHS releases. All 6 episodes were re-released on a single video release on 2 October 1995.

=== LaserDisc release ===
The Black Adder was released on a double LaserDisc set by Encore Entertainment in 1996. Due to the unequal length of the episodes, they were presented on the set slightly out of sequence.
