= Warren Clarke =

British actor (1947–2014)

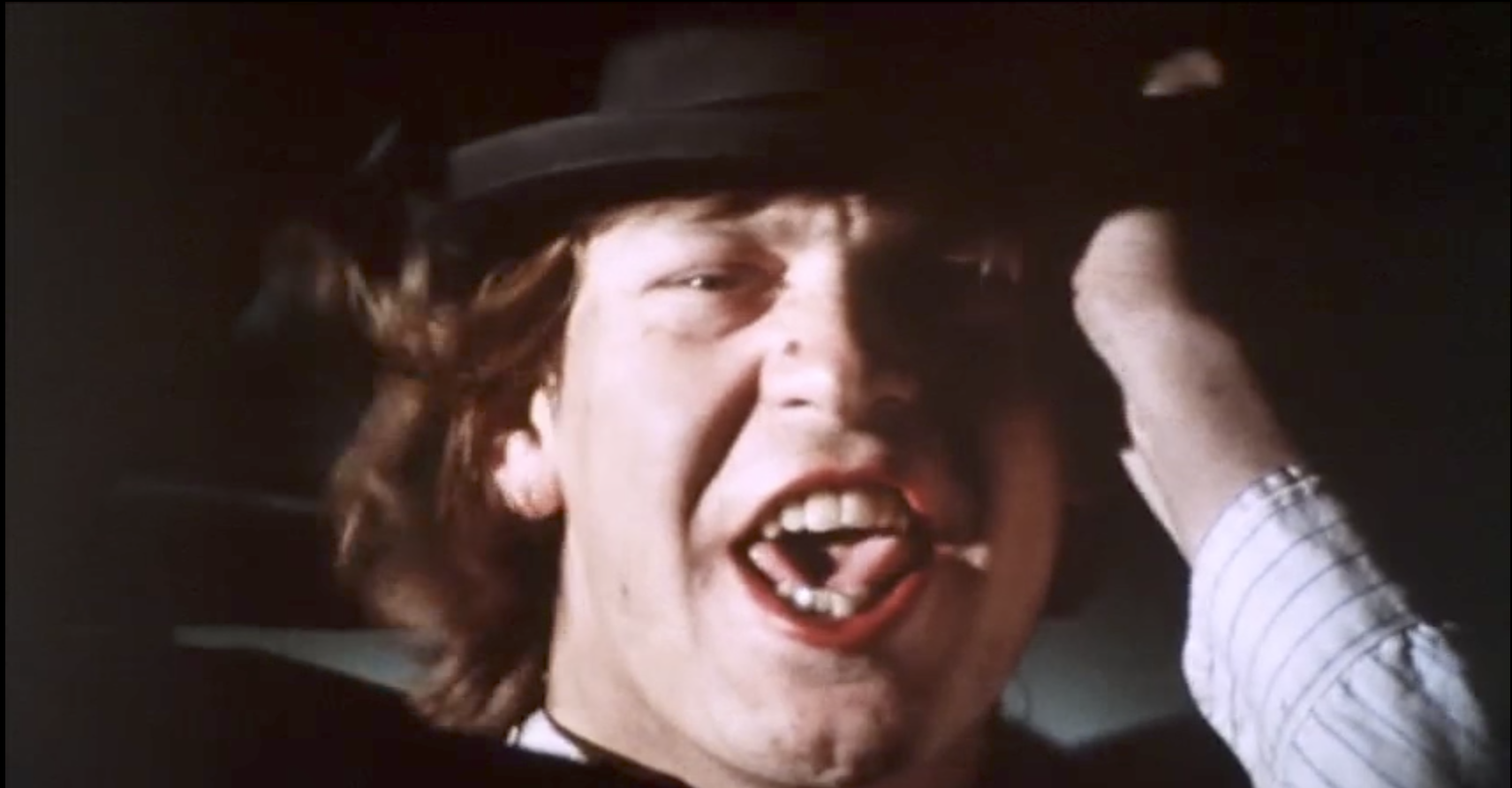
- Clarke in A Clockwork Orange (1971)
- Born: Alan James Clarke; 26 April 1947; Oldham, Lancashire, England
- Died: 12 November 2014 (aged 67); Beaconsfield, Buckinghamshire, England
- Occupation: Actor
- Years active: 1964–2014
- Spouses: Gail Lever (m. 1968; div. 1976) Michelle Mordaunt (m. 1987)
- Children: 2

Warren Clarke (born Alan James Clarke; 26 April 1947 – 12 November 2014) was an English film, television and stage actor. He appeared in several films after a significant role as Dim in Stanley Kubrick's A Clockwork Orange (1971). His television appearances included Dalziel and Pascoe (as Detective Superintendent Andy Dalziel), The Manageress and Sleepers.

== Early life ==
Clarke was born in Oldham, Lancashire. His father worked as a stained-glass maker and his mother as a secretary. He left Barlow Hall Secondary Modern School, Chorlton-cum-Hardy, Manchester, aged 15 and began work at the Manchester Evening News as a copy boy. He later moved on to amateur dramatics and performed at Huddersfield Rep before working as an actor full-time. During this period he also decided to change his first name to Warren, a name he chose as his girlfriend of the time had a crush on Warren Beatty. Clarke eventually worked with Beatty on the film Ishtar.

== Career ==
Clarke's first television appearance was in the long-running Granada soap opera Coronation Street, initially as Kenny Pickup in 1966 and then as Gary Bailey in 1968. His first major film appearance was in Stanley Kubrick's A Clockwork Orange (1971) where he played a "droog" named Dim opposite Malcolm McDowell. He appeared with McDowell again in the film O Lucky Man! (1973) and in the TV film Gulag (1985).

Clarke appeared in a wide range of roles in television and film productions including The Breaking of Bumbo (1970), Home (1970) opposite Sir Ralph Richardson and Sir John Gielgud, Charlton Heston's Antony and Cleopatra (1972), Jennie: Lady Randolph Churchill (1972), The Frighteners (ep.4 "The Minder) (1974), Tinker Tailor Soldier Spy (1979), S.O.S. Titanic (1979), Hammer House of Horror (series 1, ep. 2) (1980), Hawk the Slayer (1980), Masada (1981), Tales of the Unexpected: Never speak ill of the dead (1981), Enigma (1982), Lassiter (1984), Top Secret! (1984), Ishtar (1987) and I.D. (1995). He played a Russian dissident in Clint Eastwood's Firefox (1982).

In Granada Television's series The Jewel in the Crown (1984) Clarke played the role of the overtly homosexual 'Sophie' Dixon, and he was Colonel Krieger in the first series of LWT's Wish Me Luck (1988). In 1989 Clarke played Captain Lee in the film Crusoe. The same year he played the role of Martin Fisher, the chairman of a football club, in The Manageress and the role of Managing Director of an engineering firm, Vic Wilcox, in the TV adaptation of the David Lodge novel Nice Work. He also starred in an episode of Lovejoy entitled "Bin Diving". In 1990 he appeared in the episode "Odi, et Amo" of the situation comedy Chelmsford 123. He played Larry Patterson in Gone to the Dogs (1991), which was followed by the series Gone to Seed (1992), in which Clarke again starred. He also appeared in Our Mutual Friend (the 1976 TV mini-series) as Bradley Headstone.

In Sleepers (1991), alongside Nigel Havers, Clarke played one of the two lead roles as two KGB sleeper agents living in Britain and leading their own lives until they are reactivated. He played Bamber in the ITV comedy-drama Moving Story (1994). His comedic talents can be seen in the one-off special Blackadder: The Cavalier Years, in which he played Oliver Cromwell and in the episode "Amy and Amiability" of the series Blackadder the Third.

Beginning in 1996, he starred for eleven series as Detective Superintendent Andy Dalziel in the TV series Dalziel and Pascoe, based on the crime novels of Reginald Hill.

In 1997 he starred in the drama The Locksmith. Between 2000 and 2003, Clarke played Brian Addis, a father who moved his family from the bustle of London to a Devon farm, in the BBC TV series Down to Earth. He appeared as Mr Boythorn in the BBC One dramatisation of Bleak House (2005) and starred alongside Anthony Head in the BBC Drama The Invisibles (2008) and in the Channel 4 trilogy Red Riding (2009).

Around the same time, Clarke appeared as Commander Peters in the ITV production of Agatha Christie's Marple Why Didn't They Ask Evans? (2009). In 2010 he guested in ITV series Lewis ("Dark Matter"), Chuggington (2010), as a former SAS soldier now college porter in the BBC series Inspector George Gently ("Peace and Love", 2010) and played Mr Bott in the BBC's Just William. He guested as Robert Trevanion, the father of Stephen Tompkinson's character Danny Trevanion, in Wild at Heart in 2011, as innkeeper Samuel Quested in Midsomer Murders ("The Night of the Stag", 2011) and as John Lacey in Call the Midwife (also 2011).

His radio credits include Johnny Hardcastle in Love on the Dole (Home Service, 1965) and Henry Weldon in Lord Peter Wimsey (BBC Radio 4, 1981).

In 2014 he began filming Poldark as Charles Poldark. The character's final scene in the series, in episode four, in which he lies on his deathbed before dying, was also Clarke's final scene as an actor: he was very ill at the time of filming and died a few weeks later; the first episode of the television series was then dedicated to his memory.

== Personal life ==
Clarke was a keen golfer and had been a Manchester City supporter from the age of seven.

Clarke's marriage to his first wife ended in divorce a few years after his parents died. They had a son together, Rowan. He had a daughter, Georgia, by his second wife, Michelle.

He lived in Beaconsfield, Buckinghamshire.

On 12 November 2014 Clarke died in his sleep after a short illness. He reportedly died almost destitute; his estate being worth just over £13,000 at his death. Amongst his financial problems, Clarke had apparently lost money investing in the 2013 action film The Numbers Station.

== Filmography ==
=== Film ===
Year	Title	Role	Notes
1969	The Virgin Soldiers	Soldier	Uncredited
1970	The Breaking of Bumbo	Guardsman Andrews	
1971	A Clockwork Orange	"Dim"	
1972	Antony and Cleopatra	Scarus	
1973	O Lucky Man!	Master of Ceremonies (Nightspot) / Warner / Male Nurse	
1977	The Hunchback of Notre Dame	Quasimodo	TV movie
1979	S.O.S. Titanic	4th Officer Joseph G. Boxhall	TV movie
1979	The Great Riviera Bank Robbery	Jean	
1980	Hawk the Slayer	Scar	
1981	From a Far Country	Wladek	
1982	Firefox	Pavel Upenskoy	
1982	Enigma	Konstantin	
1984	Real Life	Gerry	
1984	Lassiter	Max Hofer	
1984	Top Secret!	Colonel Von Horst	
1985	De flyvende djævle	Arno	
1985	Gulag	Hooker	TV movie
1987	Ishtar	English Gunrunner	
1988	Crusoe	Captain Lee	
1995	I.D.	Bob	
2000	Greenfingers	Governor Hodge	
2001	Blow Dry	Tony	
2001	Arthur's Dyke	Doug Manley	
2010	The Man Who Married Himself	Bishop Zatarga	Short

=== Television ===
Year	Title	Role	Notes
1965 - 1968	Coronation Street	Barry / Kenny Pickup / Gary Bailey	9 episodes
1965 - 1966	Pardon the Expression	Terry Field / Caterer's Man / Johnnie	3 episodes
1967	Inheritance	Matthew Mellor / George Mellor	2 episodes
1968	The Avengers	Trump	Episode: "Invasion of the Earthmen"
1969	Parkin's Patch	Nethercot	Episode: "The Way Home"
1969	The Wednesday Play	Alec	Episode: "Sling Your Hook"
1970	Callan	2nd Porter	Episode: "Summoned to Appear"
1972 - 1983	Play for Today	Stevens / Alfred / The Narrator	3 episodes
1973	Armchair Theatre	Billy Turnbull	Episode: "The Death of Glory"
1973	Softly Softly: Task Force	Detective Sergeant Stirling	4 episodes
1974	Jennie: Randolph Churchill	Winston Churchill	4 episodes
1975	The Sweeney	Danny Keever	Episode: "Contract Breaker"
1976	The Expert	Detective Inspector Robbins	Episode: "Suspicious Death"
1976	Our Mutual Friend	Bradley Headstone	5 episodes
1978	The Onedin Line	Josiah Beaumont	8 episodes
1978	Z-Cars	Robbie	Episode: "The First Offender"
1979	Tinker Tailor Soldier Spy	Alwyn	Episode: "How It All Fits Together"
1979 - 1982	Crown Court	Detective Sergeant Ralph McCovey / William Johnson / Joe Withycombe	9 episodes
1980	Hammer House of Horror	Ben	Episode: "The Thirteenth Reunion"
1980 - 1984	Shelley	Paul England	4 episodes
1981	Masada	Plinius	3 episodes (TV mini-series)
1981	Tales of the Unexpected	Bob	Episode: "Never Speak Ill of the Dead"
1981	Wolcott	Terry Rowe	4 episodes
1981 - 1985	Bergerac	Philip Bernard / Henry Hoffmann	2 episodes
1982	Minder	Ashmole	Episode: "Another Bride, Another Groom"
1983	The Home Front	Hallam Place / Curtis	4 episodes
1983	Reilly, Ace of Spies	Yakushov	2 episodes
1984	Big Deal	Stephen Chambers	Episode: "Video Man"
1984	The Jewel in the Crown	Corporal "Sophie" Dixon	3 episodes
1986	Boon	Geoff Greenaway	Episode: "Unto Us Four a Son"
1986	The Return of the Antelope	Bosco	Episode: "The Antelope Christmas"
1986	Unnatural Causes	Dan	Episode: "Partners"
1987	Blackadder the Third	Mr. Harwood	Episode: "Amy and Amiability"
1988	Blackadder: The Cavalier Years	Oliver Cromwell	Short
1988	The Comic Strip Presents...	Nigel	Episode: "The Yob
1988	Tickets for the Titanic	Mitch Gridgley	Episode: "Everyone a Winner"
1988	Wish Me Luck	Colonel Werner Kreiger	5 episodes
1988	Worlds Beyond	Joe Weller	Episode: "Home"
1989	Nice Work	Victor "Vic" Wilcox	4 episodes
1989 - 1990	The Manageress	Martin Fisher	12 episodes
1990	All Creatures Great and Small	Mr. Sutcliffe	Episode: "Promises to Keep"
1990	Chelmsford 123	Iken of Mori	Episode: "Odi et Amo"
1990	Stay Lucky	Jack Finch	Episode: "Bring Barry Back to Me"
1991	All Good Things	Phil Frame	6 episodes
1991	Boon	Stan Keating	Episode: "Bad Pennies"
1991	Gone to the Dogs	Larry Patterson	6 episodes
1991	Lovejoy	Brian Nun	Episode: "Bin Diving"
1991	Sleepers	Albert Robinson / Vladimir Zelenski	4 episodes
1992	Gone to Seed	Winston	6 episodes
1992	The Secret Agent	Chief Inspector Heat	3 episodes
1993	All in a Game	Kenny Dawes	6 episodes
1993	Conjugal Rights	Toby (voice)	6 episodes
1994	The House of Windsor	Max Kelvin	4 episodes
1994 - 1995	Moving Story	Bamber	13 episodes
1995	Joseph	Ednan	2 episodes (TV mini-series)
1996 - 2007	Dalziel and Pascoe	Detective Superintendent Andy Dalziel	61 episodes
1997	The Locksmith	Ronald Pierce	6 episodes
1998	A Respectable Trade	Josiah Cole	2 episodes
1998	In the Red	George Cragge	3 episodes
2000 - 2003	Down to Earth	Brian	18 episodes
2005	Bleak House	Boythorn	5 episodes
2008	The Invisibles	Sid Woolsey	6 episodes
2008 - 2013	Chuggington	Speedy McAllister (voice)	21 episodes
2009	Marple	Commander Peters	Episode: "Why Don't They Ask Evans?"
2009	Red Riding	DCS / ACC Bill Molloy	3 episode (TV mini-series)
2010	Inspector George Gently	Charles Hexton	Episode: "Peace & Love"
2010	Just William	Mr. Bott	2 episodes
2010	Lewis	Roger Temple	Episode: "Dark Matter"
2011	Midsomer Murders	Samuel Quested	Episode: "The Night of the Stag"
2011	Wild at Heart	Robert	1 episode
2011 - 2012	In with the Flynns	Jim Flynn	12 episodes
2012	Trollied	Barry Hound	Episode: "Christmas Special"
2013	Call the Midwife	John Lacey	1 episode
2013	Way to Go	Nigel	Episode: "The End of the Beginning"
2015	Poldark	Charles Poldark	4 episodes (final role)
