= Edmund Blackadder =

Fictional character from Blackadder

Rowan Atkinson as Captain Blackadder in the Suffolk Regiment

Edmund Blackadder is the single name given to a collection of fictional characters who appear in the BBC mock-historical comedy series Blackadder, each played by Rowan Atkinson. Although each series is set within a different period of British history, all the Edmund Blackadders in the franchise are part of the same familial line. Each character also shares notable personality traits and characteristics throughout each incarnation. In a 2001 poll conducted by Channel 4, Edmund Blackadder was ranked third on their list of the 100 Greatest TV Characters.

== Common characteristics ==
Each Blackadder is positioned in a different place in British society over each series, with the character mostly falling in social rank through history. He moves from a prince (The Black Adder) to a lord (Blackadder II), a knight/baronet (Blackadder: The Cavalier Years), a royal attendant (Blackadder the Third), a shopkeeper (Blackadder's Christmas Carol, named Ebenezer Blackadder), to an army captain (Blackadder Goes Forth). Throughout each series, Blackadder is a self-serving, cynical opportunist concerned solely with increasing his own influence, status and wealth. His character is symbolised by the adder, the only venomous snake native to Great Britain, which sometimes appears in the series as a visual motif.

With the exception of the first Blackadder incarnation, Prince Edmund, each is generally cynical, charismatic and intelligent. While he is haunted by bad luck, he is usually very capable of manipulating his way out of a crisis and in securing for himself some degree of prestige and fortune. Blackadder is also usually one of the few intelligent people present at any given time and is usually surrounded by incompetent, slow-witted servants, equals and superiors. As a result, he possesses an acerbic wit and is usually prepared with numerous quick put-downs, which are often wasted on those at whom they are directed.

He is frequently present at some of the defining moments of British history, but usually views his contemporaries with unbridled contempt, regardless of their historical importance or interest. He is also generally dismissive of the contemporary arts and culture in the various eras in which he lives, such as medieval folk pageants, Shakespeare, Romanticist poetry, and Charlie Chaplin films.

Each Blackadder is also surrounded by various other figures who reappear over the series. These include his manservant Baldrick (Tony Robinson) and the various imbecilic aristocrats with whose company he is lumbered, such as Lord Percy Percy (Tim McInnerny) and George (Hugh Laurie).

== Main Blackadders ==
In this section, brief descriptions of the various Edmund Blackadders who have appeared in their own series or in another notable Blackadder production are provided.

=== Prince Edmund, Duke of Edinburgh/The Black Adder (Late Medieval England) ===
Prince Edmund (1461–1498) is the first man in the dynasty to refer to himself as "The Black Adder", a suggestion of the first Baldrick. He appears in the first series, set shortly after The Wars of the Roses. He is the second stepson of the fictional King Richard IV of England (Brian Blessed), who, it is claimed at the beginning, was cast from all historical references by his successor, Henry Tudor (Peter Benson). Prince Edmund is a very different character from his descendants: he is slow-witted, cowardly, and the butt of the other characters' jokes. While he is as devious and amoral as his descendants, his Machiavellian schemes are usually spurred on by other characters. For all this he is determined and driven to power: his primary concern is to seize the English throne and become the king himself. After the death of Richard IV and Edmund's older brother Harry (Robert East), he is briefly King of England; a lyric from one of the closing credits for Black Adder II describes him as "a king / Although for only thirty seconds". Prince Edmund is one of the many Blackadders to be killed on screen: he dies after accidentally drinking poisoned wine, although he had already been severely mutilated by his childhood nemesis, the Duke of Burgundy (Patrick Allen).

=== Edmund, Lord Blackadder (Elizabethan England) ===
Edmund, Lord Blackadder (Series 2)

Edmund, Lord Blackadder, is the next-seen member of the dynasty, appearing in Elizabethan England. He is the central character of Black Adder II and is a nobleman in the court of Queen Elizabeth I. Although his "great-grandfather" was Prince Edmund, he is much more intelligent, charismatic, acerbic, handsome and respected than his ancestor. Despite that fact, Edmund's aristocratic title has lowered; he is now simply a lord, rather than a prince. His main concerns are pleasing his Queen (Miranda Richardson), a childish, spoiled tyrant who usually threatens to execute anyone who displeases her, usually by decapitation, and in outwitting his various contemporary rivals, usually in the form of Lord Melchett (Stephen Fry), for her favour. At the end of "Blackadder II", specifically the final episode, "Chains", Blackadder and Melchett are captured by two guards on the orders of the psychopathic Prince Ludwig the Indestructible of Germany (Hugh Laurie) who Blackadder had met in the past while Ludwig was disguised as a waitress named "Big Sally". The two men are confined to a dungeon with Ludwig giving Queenie a week to decide who she will rescue. When Queenie ignores the two of them in favour of holding a big costume party, Blackadder and Melchett work together to outwit the two guards after Ludwig has departed to infiltrate the palace, arriving in time to expose Ludwig, who then attempts to flee, prompting Blackadder to throw a dagger at Ludwig that presumably either kills him or leaves him badly wounded. However, after the end credits have aired, it is shown that Ludwig has returned and murdered Blackadder, the real Queenie, Melchett, Nursie, Percy and Baldrick. Ludwig then poses as Queenie after the assassination.

The character shift from Prince Edmund in the first series to Lord Blackadder in the second is credited to the involvement of Ben Elton, who joined as the show's co-writer alongside Richard Curtis. The latter Edmund became the de facto archetype; nearly all subsequent Blackadders in the series were modelled after Edmund, Lord Blackadder - the exception being Ebenezer Blackadder, who initially began as the nicest man in England to the point of naivete but who gradually fell back into the standard persona after being abused by almost everyone around him.

=== Sir Edmund Blackadder (English Civil War) ===
Sir Edmund Blackadder appears in the Comic Relief special Blackadder: The Cavalier Years; with the honorific of "Sir", this Blackadder is either a Baronet or a Knight. Set during the English Civil War, Sir Edmund is (apparently) a loyal royalist and friend of Charles I, played by Stephen Fry.

=== Mr. Edmund Blackadder Esq. (Regency Britain) ===
Mr. Edmund Blackadder, Esq., is the Blackadder appearing in the Regency period of British history. His family having fallen on hard times, he is reduced to a life of servitude, a fall made even more insufferable by his position as butler to the oafish and uncouth George (Laurie), the Prince Regent. Despite this, he remains very intelligent (by far sharper than most of the people he associates with), and is usually found stealing from his employer. This Blackadder is the one who is most in control of his own affairs, so he is able to be more arrogantly confident than other Blackadders. This Blackadder is the only one of the main four incarnations not to be killed onscreen (the first one accidentally poisoned himself, the second was murdered, whilst the fourth is presumed to have died in battle). While history records this version of Blackadder as having been shot dead by the Duke of Wellington (Fry), in actuality Prince George was masquerading as Blackadder and vice versa, which results in Blackadder assuming the Prince Regent's identity and later becoming King George IV.

=== Mr. Ebenezer Blackadder (Victorian London) ===
Mr. Ebenezer Blackadder, the Victorian Blackadder, appears in Blackadder's Christmas Carol. Unlike his cold-hearted, cynical ancestors and the Dickens character Ebenezer Scrooge he is a parody of, he is by repute the nicest man in Victorian England. Unfortunately, this only serves to make him a target for the cynical crooks and cheats he is surrounded by, and a Christmas Carol-like encounter with the "Ghost of Christmas" sees him greatly inspired by his snide-yet-triumphant ancestors; he learns that if he reverts to their ways his descendants will rule the universe, otherwise they will end up as Baldrick's slaves in the same time period. Upon the departure of the Ghost, Blackadder renounces his compassion and reverts to type on the spot.

=== Captain Edmund Blackadder (World War I) ===
Captain Edmund Blackadder appears in Blackadder Goes Forth, set in 1917, as an officer of the Suffolk Regiment during World War I. A long-time soldier, early in his career Blackadder was "The Hero of Umboto Gorge", a fictional battle that took place in French Sudan in 1892, during which he saved the life of Douglas Haig. He also served in the 1898 Mahdist War and makes reference to having spent most of his career away from Britain. His medals suggest him fighting in the Second Boer War, though no mention of this is made in the show. Historically, the Suffolk Regiment only garrisoned in the Northern Cape, so it is plausible he saw no actual fighting against the Boers.

Prior to the outbreak of World War I, Blackadder found life in the British Army agreeable, as he had enjoyed a relatively danger-free existence. His main responsibility was to maintain the British Empire, or as he personally put it: fighting natives who were usually "two feet tall and armed with dried grass." However, in World War I, Blackadder is astute to the gravity and slaughter of trench warfare, and unlike his superior officers, realises that the earlier colonial battles produced wildly unrealistic expectations about future conflict. Characteristically reluctant to meet his end in the mud of the trenches of the Western Front, Blackadder's sole goal is to escape his inevitable fate. His attempts to escape are thwarted by the idiotic General Melchett (Fry), and Melchett's assistant Captain Kevin Darling (McInnerny), Blackadder's nemesis.

Blackadder shares his trench with Private S. Baldrick (Robinson), and Lt. The Hon. George Colthurst St Barleigh (Laurie). Also shown from afar is Douglas Haig (Geoffrey Palmer), whom Blackadder had previously saved from death.

In the series finale, "Goodbyeee", Captain Blackadder and his company are sent "over the top" in an offensive. After trying and failing to get out of the battle, Blackadder's company charges into machine gun fire, before the scene fades to a field of poppies with only birdsong to be heard, symbols of the fate of the company.

In the alternative ending of the finale, it is shown that Blackadder survives by pretending to be dead, after the entire company perishes, and diving back to the trench for safety, surviving the war.

==== Awards and decorations ====
In the series, Captain Blackadder is seen wearing the following ribbons:

Queen's South; Africa Medal	King's South; Africa Medal	1914 Star	Croix de Guerre (France)

=== Lord Edmund Blackadder / King Edmund III (Turn-of-the-Millennium) ===
In Blackadder: Back & Forth, Lord Edmund Blackadder is the modern representative of the Blackadder family. He intends to play a turn-of-the-millennium-prank on his friends by claiming that he has a time machine – only to be unpleasantly surprised that the device that Baldrick has actually built (following Leonardo da Vinci's instructions to the letter, except for marking values on the instrument display) actually is a working time machine. He manages to alter time by:

1. Beating up William Shakespeare (Colin Firth) and telling him that his plays are just people "wearing stupid tights" who are "talking total crap". When Blackadder also leaves his ballpoint pen behind, he causes Shakespeare to be viewed by history not as the great playwright, but as the pen's "inventor".
2. Convincing Robin Hood's (Rik Mayall) men that robbing from the rich is fine, but giving to the poor makes them look like complete lunatics, causing them to shoot Robin full of arrows.
3. Causing the time machine to land on top of the Duke of Wellington (Fry) during the Battle of Waterloo, allowing Napoleon Bonaparte to win the battle and conquer the United Kingdom.

He restores history but then has the idea of changing history in his favour. In the present day, a news report shows the popular King Edmund III and his queen, Marian of Sherwood (Kate Moss), being greeted by the prime minister, Baldrick. With Baldrick working as his prime minister and Parliament dissolved, the Blackadder and Baldrick families have finally triumphed and become rulers of the UK.

== Other Blackadders ==
Although not appearing within their own series or one-off special, various other Blackadders have appeared or been alluded to over the course of the series.

Several relatives of the Blackadder family include the Puritan Whiteadders, and the Highlander clan of MacAdder. Various one-off specials have introduced other Blackadders throughout history, from the Roman Centurion Blaccadicus, to a Grand Admiral Blackadder in the distant future who becomes ruler of the universe.

A Restoration Blackadder appeared in an introductory sequence for Charles, Prince of Wales' fiftieth birthday Gala Performance (1998), in which he was supposedly organising a birthday show for Charles II (also Stephen Fry).

At the 2000 Royal Variety Performance, Atkinson performed a short monologue called "Blackadder: The Army Years" as Captain Lord Edmund Blackadder of Her Majesty's Royal Regiment of Shirkers. It is possible that Captain Lord Blackadder is the same modern-day Lord Blackadder seen in "Back and Forth", although no mention of military rank is made there.

In 2002, during the Golden Jubilee of Elizabeth II, trailers for the Party at the Palace featured the Keeper of Her Majesty's Lawn Sprinklers, Sir Osmond Darling-Blackadder, who was against the idea. Sir Osmond also co-hosted the light-hearted documentary on the celebrations Jubilee Girl. He is notable for being one of the few members of the family not to be named Edmund, and also for his double-barrelled name, suggesting a family connection to Kevin Darling.

At the 2012 charity event We Are Most Amused, Atkinson appeared in a sketch parodying the then current banking crisis as Sir Edmund Blackadder, CEO of the Melchett, Melchett and Darling Bank.

In the Blackadder script book The Whole Damn Dynasty, a number of Blackadders are mentioned, beginning with a druid by the name of Edmun, who is later succeeded by the Duc d'Blackadder, who is believed to have been the man who shot King Harold Godwinson at the Battle of Hastings.

== Blackadder dynasty ==
- Edmun, a druid who helped construct Stonehenge (referred to in Blackadder: The Whole Damn Dynasty)
- Blaccadda, who insulted Boadicea of the Iceni (referred to in Blackadder: The Whole Damn Dynasty)
- Centurion Blaccadicus – Roman Britain (Blackadder Back And Forth)
- Duc D'Blackadder – Norman Conquest (referred to in Blackadder – The Whole Damn Dynasty)
- Blackadder the Chickenheart – during the reign of Richard the Lionheart (referred to in Blackadder – The Whole Damn Dynasty)
- Baron de Blackadder – during the reign of King John
- Lord Blackadder – Medieval – first name unknown, a contemporary of Robin Hood (time period visited in Blackadder Back And Forth)
- Prince Edmund, Duke of Edinburgh "The Black Adder" – Middle Ages (The Black Adder)
- Prince Edmund, Duke of York "The Black Adder" – 400 years ago (The Black Adder - unaired pilot)
- Cardinal Blackadder – Tudor (referred to in Blackadder – The Whole Damn Dynasty, father of Edmund, Lord Blackadder)
- Nathaniel Whiteadder – Elizabethan – apparent uncle to Prince Edmund
- Osric Blackadder – Elizabethan (referred to in Blackadder II)
- Edmund, Lord Blackadder – Elizabethan (Blackadder II)
- Blackadder (Shakespeare's agent) – Elizabethan
- Sir Edmund Blackadder – Stuart, English Civil War (Blackadder: The Cavalier Years)
- Lord Edmund Blackadder, Privy Counsellor – Stuart, 1680 (Blackadder and the King's Birthday )
- Duke of Blackadder – reign of Queen Anne (referred to in Blackadder – The Whole Damn Dynasty)
- Mr. E. Blackadder Esq. – Regency (Blackadder the Third)
- MacAdder – Regency – cousin of Blackadder (Blackadder the Third). MacAdder is the Scottish Cousin of Mr. E. Blackadder Esq. He is known as being the 'most dangerous man ever to wear a skirt in Europe'. He believes he is rightful king of England and plans to incite rebellion, making his cousin hate him.
- Mr. Ebenezer Blackadder – Victorian (Blackadder's Christmas Carol)
- Capt. Edmund Blackadder – First World War (Blackadder Goes Forth)
- Lord Edmund Blackadder / King Edmund III – 1999 (Blackadder Back And Forth)
- Lord Edmund Blackadder, Captain in Her Royal Highness' Regiment of Shirkers – 2000 (Blackadder: The Army Years)
- Sir Osmond Darling-Blackadder, 'Keeper of the Lawn Sprinklers' – 2002 (BBC Golden Jubilee promotion, and Jubilee Girl)
- Sir Edmund Blackadder, CEO of the Melchett, Melchett and Darling Bank – 2012 (We Are Most Amused)
- Lord Blackadder – 2020 (The Big Night In)
- Grand Admiral Blackadder of the Dark Segment – distant future (Blackadder's Christmas Carol)

== Historicity ==
Blackadder is a genuine surname, its usage in the UK currently documented back to the 15th century, which may explain the choice of the name, with the first series being set in this time period. The name is thought to be mostly Scottish in origin, which is not contradicted in the series, as the first Blackadder begins as the Duke of Edinburgh. However, the Scottish name means "black water" and the first series clearly links the name to the snake. (There is footage of a black snake in the opening credits.) In the third series, it is revealed that a branch of the Blackadder family is a significant clan in Scotland, although they have become known by the name MacAdder. There is a Clan Blackadder in reality. The late Dr Eric Blackadder, Chief Medical Officer at the BBC at the time of the first programme, made the unlikely claim that the series is named after him.

Among historical members of the Clan, in 1502, Robert Blackadder Archbishop of Glasgow presided over a botched ceremony where King James IV of Scotland swore to keep perpetual peace with England. At the first attempt, the King read his oath from a paper where "France" was written instead of "England."

George Buchanan mentions an Edmund Blackadder in his 1582 Rerum Scoticarum Historia, writing that Mary, Queen of Scots embarked on a boat at Leith to sail to Alloa Tower in June 1566, crewed by "William and Edmond Blackadder, Edward Robertson and Thomas Dickson, all Bothwell's vassals and notorious pirates." In 1567, her husband Lord Darnley was assassinated in mysterious circumstances after an explosion in Edinburgh. This Captain William Blackadder was one of the first upon the scene and taken to be one of the conspirators. He was accused, scapegoated for the murder, and executed by being hanged, drawn and quartered, with each of his four limbs being sent to a different Scottish city to be put on display. Later, it was said that he had only appeared on the street after hearing the explosion while drinking in a tavern at the Tron on the Royal Mile. Edmund Blackadder was at the battle of Carberry Hill in June 1567, and was one of the first to abandon the Queen and ride away.

A Major General Charles Blackader served in the British army during the First World War, commanding an Indian colonial brigade and the 38th (Welsh) Division on the Western Front, and a territorial brigade in Dublin during the Easter Rising of 1916.

The name "Baldrick" is also authentic – but much rarer – and has been dated in Britain back to the Norman Conquest of 1066. This name is Germanic in origin.
