= Blackadder II =

Second series of the BBC sitcom Blackadder

- Title screen of Blackadder II
- Written by: Richard Curtis; Ben Elton
- Directed by: Mandie Fletcher
- Starring: Rowan Atkinson; Tim McInnerny; Tony Robinson; Miranda Richardson; Stephen Fry; Patsy Byrne
- Theme music composer: Howard Goodall
- Country of origin: United Kingdom
- Original language: English
- No. of episodes: 6

Production
- Producer: John Lloyd
- Camera setup: Multiple
- Running time: 30 minutes

Original release
- Network: BBC1
- Release: 9 January – 20 February 1986

Related
- The Black Adder; Blackadder the Third

Blackadder II (Note: The single word "Blackadder" is hyphenated across two lines as "Black- adder II" on the title screen.) is the second series of the BBC sitcom Blackadder, written by Richard Curtis and Ben Elton, which aired from 9 January 1986 to 20 February 1986. The series is set in England during the reign of Queen Elizabeth I (1558–1603), and sees the principal character, Edmund, Lord Blackadder, as a Tudor courtier attempting to win the favour of the Queen while avoiding execution by decapitation, a fate that befell many of her suitors.

The series is the successor to The Black Adder, and differed significantly from its predecessor, notably with Ben Elton replacing Rowan Atkinson as the second writer, filming in studio sets, rather than on location, the introduction of a Machiavellian Blackadder and a less intelligent Baldrick.

A third series, Blackadder the Third, aired in 1987.

== Plot ==
The series is set during the Elizabethan era (1558–1603). The principal character, Edmund, Lord Blackadder (Rowan Atkinson), is the great-grandson of the original Black Adder and is now a member of the London aristocracy. Unlike his forefather, he is both dashing and intelligent, although he is still scheming and cynical in his outlook. The series follows his attempts to win the favour of the childish Queen Elizabeth I (Miranda Richardson). As before, he is aided, and often hindered, by two less-than-intelligent sidekicks, his servant Baldrick (Tony Robinson), and Lord Percy Percy (Tim McInnerny), heir to the Duchy of Northumberland, with whom Blackadder has a grudging friendship.

Throughout the series, Blackadder's chief rival is Lord Melchett (Stephen Fry), the Queen's pretentious and grovelling Lord Chamberlain. Melchett fears upsetting the Queen, and thus attempts to outdo Blackadder by supporting the Queen in whatever current fad she is interested in. Comic relief in the Court is provided by the Queen's demented former nanny, Nursie (Patsy Byrne) who often reveals embarrassing stories about Queenie's past.

The series finale episode, "Chains" sees Blackadder and Melchett being kidnapped by two guards working for Prince Ludwig the Indestructible (Hugh Laurie) who holds them prisoner in a dungeon, Ludwig demanding a ransom be paid in exchange for having one of them released but after receiving a message informing them Queenie has decided to ignore saving them in favour of holding a big party, which later becomes a costume party, the two men, whose original death sentences are later changed to life imprisonment, work together to successfully outwit Ludwig's guards and return to England, arriving at the palace in time to stop Ludwig from killing Queenie and fulfilling his goal of becoming King of England, which was revealed to have been brought on the fact that as a child, he had dirty hair, spots and was forced to wear shorts by his mother, earning him ridicule from his classmates who also gave him the nickname, "Shorty Greasy Spot-Spot" which Ludwig despises so much so that he flies into a rage if it is mentioned in his presence. Upon being exposed, Ludwig attempts to flee while vowing he will return and get his revenge, but is presumably killed or wounded off-screen by a dagger that Blackadder throws at him, ending his threat. However, after the end credits have been shown, Ludwig is revealed to have survived the attack, returning to murder the original Queenie and after stealing her identity, also gone on to kill Blackadder, Melchett, Nursie, Baldrick and Percy, Ludwig presumably going on to rule England for many years, disguised as Queenie.

Baldrick, who in the first series was the most intelligent of the main trio, became more stupid, an idea proposed by Ben Elton to make him "the stupidest person in the history of...human beings", and to act as a foil to Blackadder's new-found intelligence. The series was also the originator of Baldrick's obsession with the turnip, although this apparently arose from a botanical error on the part of Elton, who confused the vegetable with the "amusingly shaped" parsnip.

Lord Percy remained similar in character to the original series, as a foolish sidekick in Blackadder's plots and predicaments. In this respect, McInnerny said the character resembled Sir Andrew Aguecheek in Shakespeare's Twelfth Night. As with The Black Adder, the series featured many tongue-in-cheek references to Shakespeare's plays; Shakespeare is mentioned as a contemporary Elizabethan, and his famous quotations are twisted for comic effect. The first episode "Bells", follows a similar plot to Twelfth Night.

== Episodes ==
The series aired for six episodes broadcast on Thursdays on BBC1 at 9.30pm between 9 January 1986 and 20 February 1986.

"Head" was originally intended to be the first episode and was first to be filmed. This resulted in the small continuity error of Lord Percy still having a beard in "Head" which he shaves off in "Bells". In addition, during the early scenes of "Head", the principal characters are introduced to the audience with Baldrick's stupidity highlighted.

No. overall	No. in series	Title	Directed by	Written by	Recorded date	Original release date
7	1	"Bells"	Mandie Fletcher	Richard Curtis & Ben Elton	13 June 1985	9 January 1986
Blackadder gains a new young servant, Bob, and somehow falls for him. When he discovers that Bob is a girl named Kate, he wishes to marry her, much to Queenie's confusion. Guest appearances by Rik Mayall as Lord Flashheart and Gabrielle Glaister as Bob.
8	2	"Head"	Mandie Fletcher	Richard Curtis & Ben Elton	9 June 1985	16 January 1986
Blackadder relishes his new position as the Queen's head executioner, until a change to the execution schedule leads to catastrophic results when prisoner Lord Farrow's wife wishes to visit him and the Queen decides to pardon him, despite his having been executed two days earlier.
9	3	"Potato"	Mandie Fletcher	Richard Curtis & Ben Elton	23 June 1985	23 January 1986
Attempting to impress the Queen in the wake of Sir Walter Raleigh's return from his round-the-world voyage, Blackadder announces his plan to sail to the dangerous Cape of Good Hope and enlists the services of the insane Captain Redbeard Rum to help him do so. Guest appearances by Simon Jones as Sir Walter Raleigh and Tom Baker as Captain Rum.
10	4	"Money"	Mandie Fletcher	Richard Curtis & Ben Elton	30 June 1985	6 February 1986
Blackadder owes £1,000 to the Bank of the Black Monks, and the baby-eating Bishop of Bath and Wells threatens to shove a hot poker into his bowels if he does not repay the money. Blackadder's attempts to raise the money are thwarted when he has to pay his earnings to the Queen each time, so he resorts to blackmailing the bishop. Guest appearance by Ronald Lacey as "The baby-eating Bishop of Bath and Wells".
11	5	"Beer"	Mandie Fletcher	Richard Curtis & Ben Elton	7 July 1985	13 February 1986
Blackadder discovers that his ludicrously Puritan, but very wealthy, Aunt and Uncle Whiteadder are coming to visit him on the same night he is hosting a party and high stakes drinking contest with Lord Melchett. Meanwhile, a curious Queenie intends to find out what happens at said parties. Guest appearances by Hugh Laurie and Miriam Margolyes.
12	6	"Chains"	Mandie Fletcher	Richard Curtis & Ben Elton	14 July 1985	20 February 1986
Blackadder and Melchett are kidnapped and held for ransom by the German mastermind Prince Ludwig the Indestructible. The Queen must then decide which of the men she will save. Guest appearance by Hugh Laurie.

== Production ==
=== Development ===
Due to the high cost of the first series, Michael Grade (the then-controller of programming of BBC1) was reluctant to sign off a second series without major improvements and cost-cutting, leaving a gap of three years between the two series.

Rowan Atkinson did not wish to continue writing for the second series, so writer and stand-up comedian Ben Elton was chosen to replace him. According to producer John Lloyd, Ben Elton was particularly keen on the choice of the Elizabethan age for the series, because it was "a sexy age that the kids can relate to." As a stand-up comic, Elton often acted as the studio warm-up comic to amuse the audience before filming began. The scripts were also tightened up during principal rehearsals with the actors; according to Richard Curtis, an entire script for a murder mystery-style episode was dropped because the writers felt it did not work.

=== Filming ===
To make the show more cost-effective, it was principally filmed on specially designed small sets at BBC Television Centre created by designer Tony Thorpe. The sets were de-constructed and rebuilt during the period of studio filming, as was normal for studio series then. In particular, the Queen's throne room and Blackadder's front room were featured in every episode, with only two further unique sets per episode, including an execution chamber in "Head" and a Spanish dungeon in "Chains". Only one outside location shoot was used in the whole series, which took place before principal filming on Thursday 30 May 1985 at Wilton House, Wiltshire. These outdoor scenes were Blackadder's courting scene in "Bells" and the end title sequences. Studio recordings shot in front of a live audience began on Sunday 9 June 1985 with the recording of "Head". Subsequent episodes were filmed on a weekly basis in the sequence "Bells", "Potato", "Money", "Beer" and "Chains". Director Mandie Fletcher was keen for the action to be shot spontaneously and was averse to complex costume changes or special effects which required recording to be halted. She is reputed to have said filming it was "a bit like doing Shakespeare in front of an audience – it's not at all like doing sitcom."

=== Cast ===
The size of the principal cast was reduced compared to the previous series, with a fixed number of characters appearing in every episode. Richard Curtis has been quoted as saying that due to the familiar cast, the series was the happiest for him to work on, comparing it to a "friendly bunch of school chums".

Rowan Atkinson as Lord Edmund Blackadder

- Rowan Atkinson as Lord Edmund Blackadder
- Tim McInnerny as Lord Percy Percy, Heir to the Duchy of Northumberland
- Tony Robinson as Baldrick
- Miranda Richardson as Queen Elizabeth I of England
- Stephen Fry as Lord Melchett, the Lord Chamberlain
- Patsy Byrne as Nursie

The series also featured at least one significant cameo role per episode. Notable appearances include Rik Mayall as the debonair Lord Flashheart in "Bells"; Tom Baker and Simon Jones as Captain Redbeard Rum and Sir Walter Raleigh, respectively, in "Potato"; Ronald Lacey as the baby-eating Bishop of Bath and Wells in "Money"; Miriam Margolyes, who had appeared in the previous series, as the puritanical Lady Whiteadder in "Beer"; and Stephen Fry's comedy partner Hugh Laurie, who appears twice, first as the drunken Simon Partridge in "Beer" and in the final episode as the evil Prince Ludwig. Laurie was later given a larger role as George in the next two series. Also Bob, played by Gabrielle Glaister, a former classmate of Ben Elton's, made her first appearance. Several of the characters were seen in similar guises in later series.

=== Music and titles ===
The opening titles are accompanied by a mock-Elizabethan arrangement of Howard Goodall's Blackadder theme played on a recorder and an electric guitar, and feature a black snake slithering about on a marble table. The snake, non-compliant to the wishes of its handler, is eventually removed and replaced with something related to the episode title, which in this series is always a single noun. The opening ominous string crescendo and imagery are a parody of the opening credits of I, Claudius, the 1976 BBC television adaptation of Robert Graves' novel of the same name.

The closing titles use a different arrangement of the theme, sung by countertenor Jeremy Jackman, with lyrics (usually insulting Blackadder) that reflect the events of the preceding episode. The song is played over a shot of Blackadder strolling through a formal garden and being annoyed by the lute-wielding minstrel (Tony Aitken). This sequence was incorporated as a separate subplot, with Blackadder constantly attempting to apprehend the musician each time with limited success. At the end of the final episode, Blackadder catches the minstrel and repeatedly dunks him in a fountain.

== Releases ==
The complete series of Blackadder II is available as a Region 2 DVD from BBC Worldwide, as well as in a complete box set with the other series, most recently as a remastered edition including a commentary on selected episodes. An earlier VHS release of the series was also produced in 1996. The series is also available in Region 1 DVD in a box set of the complete series. In addition, an audio recording taken from the television episodes is available on cassette and compact disc.

=== VHS releases ===
- In about October 1989, BBC Enterprises Ltd released all six episodes of Blackadder II on two single videos; they were re-released on 7 September 1992 in 'Complete', a double-VHS box set. All six episodes were re-released on a single video on 2 October 1995.

VHS video title	Year of release/BBFC rating	Episodes
Blackadder II- Parte the Firste (BBCV 4298)	2 October 1989 (PG)	"Bells", "Head", "Potato"
Blackadder II- Parte the Seconde (BBCV 4299)	2 October 1989 (15)	"Money", "Beer", "Chains"
The Complete Blackadder II (Double Pack) (BBCV 4785)	7 September 1992 (15)	TAPE 1: "Bells", "Head", "Potato"; TAPE 2: "Money", "Beer", "Chains"
Blackadder II- The Entire Historic Second Series (BBCV 5712)	2 October 1995 (15)	same as 'The Complete Blackadder II' but with all six episodes on a single video: "Bells", "Head", "Potato", "Money", "Beer", "Chains"

=== DVD releases ===
DVD title	DVD content	Region 1	Region 2	Region 4
Blackadder II	Complete second series, no extras.	26 June 2001	22 October 2001	28 February 2002
The Complete Blackadder	All four series, no extras.		12 November 2001	3 October 2002
Blackadder – The Complete Collection	All four series and specials, no extras.	26 June 2001	3 October 2005	
Blackadder Remastered – The Ultimate Edition	All four series and specials remastered, plus Blackadder Rides Again documentary, audio commentaries on selected episodes and interviews with cast.	20 October 2009	15 June 2009	1 October 2009

=== LaserDisc release ===
Blackadder II was released on a double LaserDisc set by Encore Entertainment in 1996, the episodes spread over three of the four sides.
