= Blackadder the Third =

1987 British TV sitcom series

- Title screen of Blackadder the Third
- Written by: Richard Curtis; Ben Elton
- Directed by: Mandie Fletcher
- Starring: Rowan Atkinson; Tony Robinson; Hugh Laurie; Helen Atkinson-Wood
- Theme music composer: Howard Goodall
- Country of origin: United Kingdom
- No. of episodes: 6 (list of episodes)

Production
- Producer: John Lloyd
- Running time: 30 minutes

Original release
- Network: BBC1
- Release: 17 September – 22 October 1987

Related
- Blackadder II; Blackadder: The Cavalier Years

Blackadder the Third is the third series of the BBC sitcom Blackadder, written by Richard Curtis and Ben Elton, which aired on BBC1 from 17 September to 22 October 1987. The series is set during the Georgian Era, and sees the principal character, Edmund Blackadder, serve as butler to the Prince Regent and have to contend with, or cash in on, the fads of the age embraced by his master.

The successor to Blackadder II, the series reduced the number of principal characters again compared with the previous series, but instead included a number of significant cameo roles by well-known comic actors. The programme won a BAFTA award for Best Comedy Series in 1988 and received three further nominations.

A fourth and final series, Blackadder Goes Forth, aired in 1989.

== Plot ==
Blackadder the Third is vaguely set in the late 18th and early 19th century period known as the Regency, although it is not possible to precisely date any episode as the historical events and persons depicted and referenced are (perhaps intentionally) anachronistic. For example, the formal Regency (during which King George III was incapacitated due to poor mental health and his son, George, Prince of Wales, served as regent) was in place between 1811 and 1820, and the series repeatedly refers to George as "Prince Regent". However, the second episode depicts Samuel Johnson (who died in 1784) working on his groundbreaking dictionary (which was published in 1755). Likewise, the final episode is set just before the Battle of Trafalgar (1805), but refers to George as Prince Regent, depicts George III as suffering from mental illness, and refers to Arthur Wellesley, who was not created "Viscount Wellington" until 1809, as "Wellington".

In the series, Mr. E. Blackadder Esquire (Rowan Atkinson) is the head butler to the Prince of Wales (Hugh Laurie), who is a spoiled, foppish idiot. Despite Blackadder's respected intelligence and abilities, he has no personal fortune to speak of. On the other hand, given the ease with which he is able to manipulate the prince, he is generally financially comfortable. According to Blackadder, he has been serving the Prince Regent all of his life, ever since the prince was breastfed (when he had to show the prince which part of his mother was "serving the drinks").

Baldrick (Tony Robinson) remains similar to his Blackadder II predecessor, and although his "cunning plans" cease to be even remotely intelligent (except in the last episode), he is the most aware of political, religious and social events. As Blackadder himself is now a servant, Baldrick is labelled as Blackadder's "dogsbody". In this series, Baldrick often displays a more belligerent attitude towards his master, even referring to him once as a "lazy, big-nosed, rubber-faced bastard" or deliberately comparing his face to his Scottish cousin, MacAdder, who Blackadder openly believes to be ugly. Blackadder often affectionately calls him "Balders" (and Baldrick sometimes calls Blackadder "Mr. B.").

There are three main sets: the prince's quarters, which are opulently decorated; the below-stairs kitchen hangout of Blackadder and Baldrick, which is dark and squalid (though very large and with a very high ceiling); and finally Mrs. Miggins' coffeehouse. Mrs. Miggins' pie shop was a never-seen running gag in Blackadder II; a descendant of hers is now finally shown, played by Helen Atkinson-Wood (No relation to Rowan Atkinson).

The plots feature rotten boroughs, Dr. Samuel Johnson (played by Robbie Coltrane), the French Revolution (featuring Chris Barrie as a revolutionary) and the Scarlet Pimpernel, over-the-top theatrical actors, squirrel-hating female highwaymen, the practice of settling quarrels with a duel, and the discussion of tactics with the Duke of Wellington (played by Stephen Fry).

The last episode features Rowan Atkinson as Blackadder's Scottish cousin MacAdder, supposedly a fierce swordsman. This leads to a dialogue in which Atkinson is acting both parts. After this episode, Blackadder finds fortune and ends up permanently posing as the Prince Regent after the real prince, disguised as Blackadder, dies after being fatally shot in the chest by the Duke of Wellington.

== Episodes ==
The series aired for six episodes broadcast on Thursdays at 9:30 pm on BBC1. The titles of the episodes are always a noun paired with another, derived from an adjective beginning with the same letters, in the manner of the Jane Austen novels, Sense and Sensibility and Pride and Prejudice. On the first broadcast, fifth episode "Amy and Amiability" was billed in the Radio Times under its working title of "Cape and Capability".

| No. overall | No. in series | Title | Directed by | Written by | Recorded date | Original release date |
|---|---|---|---|---|---|---|
| 13 | 1 | "Dish and Dishonesty" | Mandie Fletcher | Richard Curtis & Ben Elton | 19 June 1987 | 17 September 1987 |
Blackadder attempts to win a by-election in the rotten borough of Dunny-on-the-Wold against the petulant teenage Prime Minister William Pitt the Younger (who plans to bankrupt Blackadder's master, the Prince Regent, by removing him from the Civil list), using Baldrick (later known as Mr. S Baldrick, the initial letter standing for "Sodoff") as the MP. Unfortunately, after Baldrick wins, he is manipulated into voting for Pitt, pushing Blackadder to meddle with politics even further. Featuring Vincent Hanna as "his own great-great-great-grandfather".
| 14 | 2 | "Ink and Incapability" | Mandie Fletcher | Richard Curtis & Ben Elton | 5 June 1987 | 24 September 1987 |
The Prince decides to become patron of Dr. Samuel Johnson and his new dictionary, until they become enemies after the prince offends Dr. Johnson. When Blackadder discovers that Baldrick has burnt the only copy of Dr. Johnson's dictionary, Blackadder must rewrite the dictionary. Guest starring Robbie Coltrane as Dr. Johnson.
| 15 | 3 | "Nob and Nobility" | Mandie Fletcher | Richard Curtis & Ben Elton | 10 July 1987 | 1 October 1987 |
Irritated by the new obsession with all things French, Blackadder makes a bet with Lords Topper and Smedley and goes out to rescue an aristocrat and claim his 1,000 guineas. Guest starring Tim McInnerny, Nigel Planer and Chris Barrie. Note: Despite this being the third episode in the series, this was actually the last one to be filmed.
| 16 | 4 | "Sense and Senility" | Mandie Fletcher | Richard Curtis & Ben Elton | 12 June 1987 | 8 October 1987 |
When an assassination attempt is made on the Prince, Blackadder decides to help him with his image by writing a public speech. Against Blackadder's advice, the Prince employs two over-the-top actors, Enoch Mossop and David Keanrick, to coach him on how to give the speech. Guest starring Hugh Paddick, Kenneth Connor and Ben Elton.
| 17 | 5 | "Amy and Amiability" | Mandie Fletcher | Richard Curtis & Ben Elton | 26 June 1987 | 15 October 1987 |
When the Prince runs out of money, Edmund attempts to marry him off to the daughter of a rich industrialist, but is thwarted at every turn by the mysterious highwayman "The Shadow". Guest appearances by Miranda Richardson as Amy Hardwood and Warren Clarke as Mr Hardwood.
| 18 | 6 | "Duel and Duality" | Mandie Fletcher | Richard Curtis & Ben Elton | 3 July 1987 | 22 October 1987 |
The Duke of Wellington promises to kill the prince in a duel after the prince has an affair with two of the duke's nieces. Baldrick comes up with a plan involving Blackadder taking the prince's place in the duel, and Blackadder intends on using his mad Scottish cousin, MacAdder. Guest starring Stephen Fry as the Duke of Wellington.

== Cast ==
The principal cast of Blackadder the Third in their Regency-styled costumes. Top (L-R): Rowan Atkinson, Hugh Laurie, Helen Atkinson-Wood. Bottom: Tony Robinson

- Rowan Atkinson as Edmund Blackadder
- Tony Robinson as Baldrick
- Hugh Laurie as Prince George
- Helen Atkinson-Wood as Mrs Miggins

Although this series reduced the size of the show's cast, the programme featured guest appearances in each episode. Tim McInnerny decided not to continue playing the character of Lord Percy for fear of being typecast, although he appeared in a guest role as Lord Topper in episode three. Stephen Fry and Miranda Richardson, who had played major parts in Blackadder II, also appeared in guest roles as the Duke of Wellington and a disguised highwayman, respectively. Fry and McInnerny would return as regular performers for the fourth series of Blackadder. Other notable guest stars included Denis Lill as Sir Talbot Buxomley MP, Robbie Coltrane as Dr. Samuel Johnson, and Hugh Paddick and Kenneth Connor as stage actors Keanrick and Mossop, respectively.

== Music and titles ==
The opening theme is this time a minuet played on a harpsichord, oboe and cello over close-ups of Blackadder searching a bookcase. The credits and title appear on the books' spines, and each has a condition and script to match each character, for example Baldrick's is plain and in poor condition. Other amusing interspersed titles include From Black Death to Blackadder, The Blackobite Rebellion of 1745, The Encyclopædia Blackaddica and Landscape Gardening by Capability Brownadder. Hidden inside a hollow book, he finds a romance novel (complete with cover art) bearing the title of the particular episode. The closing credits are presented in the style of a theatre programme from a Regency-era play, and with an accordion closing theme that samples the melody of the original theme.

== Awards ==
The programme won a BAFTA award for Best Comedy Series in 1988. It was also nominated for three more awards; Rowan Atkinson for "Best Light Entertainment Performance", Antony Thorpe for "Best Design" and Victoria Pocock for "Best Make Up". The four series of Blackadder were voted second in the BBC's Britain's Best Sitcom in 2004.

== Media releases ==
Blackadder The Third is available on BBC Worldwide-distributed DVD and VHS video as an individual series or as part of a boxset with the other series of Blackadder. A BBC Radio Collection audio version created from the TV soundtrack is available on cassette and CD. All four seasons and the Christmas special are available on iTunes. The complete scripts of the four television series were released in 1998 as Blackadder: The Whole Damn Dynasty 1485–1917, and by Penguin Books in 2009.

=== VHS releases ===
- In June 1988, November 1988, and February 1989, BBC Enterprises Ltd released all six episodes of Blackadder the Third on two videos. They were re-released on 7 September 1992 as a double VHS, and on 2 October 1995 as a single video.

| VHS video title | Year of release/BBFC rating | Episodes |
|---|---|---|
| Blackadder The Third: Sense and Senility (BBCV 4143) | 6 June 1988 (15) | Sense and Senility, Amy and Amibility, Duel and Duality |
| Blackadder The Third- Dish and Dishonesty (BBCV 4175) | 7 November 1988, and 6 February 1989 (PG) | Dish and Dishonesty, Ink and Incapability, Nob and Nobility |
| Blackadder The Third- Sense and Senility (BBCV 4176) | 7 November 1988, and 6 February 1989 (15) | Sense and Senility, Amy and Amibility, Duel and Duality |
| The Complete Blackadder the Third (Double Pack) (BBCV 4786) | 7 September 1992 (15) | TAPE 1: Dish and Dishonesty, Ink and Incapability, Nob and Nobility, TAPE 2: Sense and Senility, Amy and Amibility, Duel and Duality |
| Blackadder the Third- The Entire Historic Third Series (BBCV 5713) | 2 October 1995 (15) | Same as 'The Complete Blackadder the Third' but with all 6 episodes on a single video: Dish and Dishonesty, Ink and Incapability, Nob and Nobility, Sense and Senility, Amy and Amiability, Duel and Duality |

=== DVD releases ===
| DVD title | DVD Content | Region 1 | Region 2 | Region 4 |
|---|---|---|---|---|
| Blackadder 3 | Complete third series, no extras. | 26 June 2001 | 5 February 2001 | 28 February 2002 |
| The Complete Blackadder | All four series, no extras. | N/A | 12 November 2001 | 3 October 2002 |
| Blackadder – The Complete Collection | All four series and specials, no extras. | 26 June 2001 | 3 October 2005 | N/A |
| Blackadder Remastered – The Ultimate Edition | All four series and specials remastered, plus Blackadder Rides Again documentary, audio commentaries on selected episodes and interviews with cast. | 20 October 2009 | 15 June 2009 | 1 October 2009 |

=== LaserDisc release ===
Blackadder The Third was released on a double LaserDisc set by Encore Entertainment in May 1997. The episodes were spread over three of the four sides.
