= Tim McInnerny =

English actor and comedian (born 1956)

- McInnerny at a presentation of Severance in 2006
- Born: Timothy L. McInnerny; 18 September 1956 (age 70); Cheadle Hulme, Cheshire, England
- Education: Marling School
- Alma mater: Wadham College, Oxford
- Occupation: Actor
- Years active: 1983–present
- Spouse: Annie Gosney

Timothy L. McInnerny (/ˌmækɪˈnɜːrni/ MAK-in-UR-nee; born 18 September 1956) is an English actor and comedian. He is notable for appearing as multiple characters in the Blackadder series, playing Lord Percy Percy in The Black Adder (1983), and Blackadder II (1986); as the Scarlet Pimpernel in Blackadder the Third (1987), Captain Kevin Darling in Blackadder Goes Forth (1989), and returned to play Archdeacon Darling, the Duke of Darling, and le Duc de Darling in Blackadder: Back and Forth (1999).

Other credits include Erik the Viking (1989), Richard III (1995), 101 Dalmatians (1996), FairyTale: A True Story (1997), Notting Hill (1999), 102 Dalmatians (2000), Longitude (2000) The Emperor's New Clothes (2001), Spooks (2004), Gunpowder, Treason & Plot (2004), Casanova (2005), Severance (2006), The Devil's Whore (2008), Black Death (2010) New Tricks (2012), Game of Thrones (season 6) (2016), National Treasure (2016), Eddie The Eagle (2016), In the Dark (2017), Strike (2017), Harlots (2017), Strangers (2018), Peterloo (2018), The Trial of Christine Keeler (2019–2020), The Windermere Children (2020), Gangs of London (2020), The Serpent (2021), Ten Percent (2022), One Day (2024), Gladiator II (2024), and Bookish (2025).

== Early life ==
McInnerny was born on 18 September 1956 in Cheadle Hulme, Cheshire, the son of Mary Joan (née Gibbings) and William Ronald McInnerny. He has two sisters. He was brought up in Cheadle Hulme and in Stroud, Gloucestershire, and educated at Marling School, a grammar school in Stroud, and read English at Wadham College, Oxford, matriculating in 1976 after taking a gap year backpacking around the world.

== Career ==
=== Television ===
McInnerny's first role was in Blackadder during the 1980s. He played the two bumbling related aristocrats with the same name of Lord Percy Percy in the first series The Black Adder (1983), and the second series Blackadder II (1986); He made a guest appearance in one episode as the Scarlet Pimpernel in Blackadder the Third (1987), and returned to the main cast to play Captain Kevin Darling in the fourth series Blackadder Goes Forth (1989). He returned to play Archdeacon Darling, the Duke of Darling, and le Duc de Darling in Blackadder: Back and Forth (1999).

McInnerny had a minor but significant role as Emma Craven's boyfriend Terry Shields, in the BBC TV serial Edge of Darkness (1985).

In 2004, McInnerny played Oliver Mace in Spooks, and Cecil in Gunpowder, Treason & Plot. In films he played The Doge in the film Casanova (2005), Richard in Severance (2006), Joliffe in The Devil's Whore (2008), and Hob in Black Death (2010).

More recent TV appearances include Law & Order: UK (2011), as a man wrongly convicted of murdering his daughter, and New Tricks (2012). In 2016, McInnerny joined the cast of the HBO series Game of Thrones in Season 6 as Lord Robett Glover.

In 2007 McInnerny spoke candidly about his love of ITV sitcoms, after receiving criticism for his views expressed on the BBC cult show I Love the '70s: "I think shows like Mind Your Language and Love Thy Neighbour need to be remembered for what they were; truly fantastic examples of sitcom writing that hasn't been seen since. The content is unfortunate in the cold light of modern society, but that's no reason to stop praising the sheer brilliance of the writers that ITV had in its ranks during that decade."

Television

Year	Title	Role	Notes	Ref.
1983	The Black Adder	Lord Percy Percy		
1985	The Adventures of Sherlock Holmes	John Clay; Vincent Spalding	Episode: "The Red-Headed League"	
1985	Edge of Darkness	Terry Shields		
1986	Anastasia: The Mystery of Anna	Yakovlev		
1986	Blackadder II	Lord Percy Percy		
1987	Blackadder the Third	Topper; The Scarlet Pimpernel	Episode: "Nob and Nobility"	
1988	A Very British Coup	Fiennes	Three-part TV serial	
1989	Blackadder Goes Forth	Captain Kevin Darling		
1992	The Bill	Kevin Finch	Episode: "Open to Offers"	
1993	The Young Indiana Jones Chronicles	Franz Kafka	Episode: "Prague, August 1917"	
1997	Tracey Takes On...	Timothy Bugge		
1999	Blackadder: Back and Forth	Archdeacon Darling the Duke of Darling le Duc de Darling		
1999	The Vice	Max Wilson	episode "Sons" (Parts 1 and 2)	
2000	The Miracle Maker	Barabbas	voice only	
2002	Don't Eat the Neighbours	Terrapin		
2002	Trial & Retribution	Eric Fowler	Series 6	
2004	Spooks	Oliver Mace		
2004	Agatha Christie's Marple: The Murder at the Vicarage	Reverend Leonard Clement		
2004	Gunpowder, Treason & Plot	Cecil		
2006	The Line of Beauty	Gerald Fedden	TV miniseries	
2008	Doctor Who	Klineman Halpen	Episode: "Planet of the Ood"; Series 4	
2009	Hustle	Judge Anthony Kent		
2009	Inspector George Gently	Geoffrey Pershore	Episode: "Gently Through the Mill"	
2010	Midsomer Murders	Hugh Dalgleish	Episode: "The Sword of Guillaume" #13.2	
2011	Law & Order: UK	Simon Bennett	Episode: "Haunted"	
2011	Twenty Twelve	Tony Ward	Episode #1.6	
2011	The Body Farm	Richard Warner	Episode "You've Got Visitors"	
2011–2012	New Tricks	Stephen Fisher	Episodes: "The Gentleman That Vanished", "A Death in the Family" and "Part of a Whole"	
2012	The Bleak Old Shop of Stuff	Harmswell Grimstone	Episodes: "#1.1", "#1.2", "#1.3"	
2014	Castles in the Sky	Churchill		
2014	Outlander	Father Bain		
2014	Utopia	Airey Neave	Episode: "Episode 1"	
2014	The Boy in the Dress	Mr Hawthorn		
2015	Strike Back: Legacy	Robin Foster		
2016	Sherlock	Eustace Carmichael	Episode: "The Abominable Bride"	
2016	Houdini and Doyle	Horace Merring	Episodes: "#1", "#2", "#8"	
2016–2017	Game of Thrones	Robett Glover	Episodes: "The Broken Man", "The Winds of Winter", "Dragonstone", "Stormborn", "Eastwatch"	
2016	National Treasure	Karl		
2017	In the Dark	Frank Linnell	Episodes: 1.3, 1.4	
2017	Strike	Daniel Chard	The Silkworm	
2017	Harlots	Lord Repton	Episodes: 1.1, 1.3, 1.4, 1.5	
2018	Strangers	Arthur Bach		
2019–2020	The Trial of Christine Keeler	Martin Redmayne	Recurring role	
2020	The Windermere Children	Leonard Montefiore		
2020	Gangs of London	Mr Jacob	Episode: 1.9	
2021	The Serpent	Paul Siemons		
2022	Ten Percent	Simon Gould		
2023	Mrs. Davis	Apron Man	Episodes: "Zwei Sie Piel mit Seitung Sie Wirtschaftung", "A Baby with Wings, a Sad Boy with Wings and a Great Helmet"	
2024	One Day	Stephen Mayhew		
2025	Bookish	D	Episodes: "Slightly Foxed: Part 1", "Slightly Foxed: Part 2","Such Devoted Sisters: Part 1"	

=== Film ===
Year	Title	Role	Notes	Ref.
1983	Dead on Time	Customer	Short film	
1985	Wetherby	John Morgan		
1989	Erik the Viking	Sven the Berserk		
1995	Richard III	William Catesby		
1996	101 Dalmatians	Alonzo		
1997	FairyTale: A True Story	John Ferret		
1999	Rogue Trader	Tony Hawes		
1999	Notting Hill	Max		
1999	The Miracle Maker	Barabbas	voice	
2000	102 Dalmatians	Alonzo		
2001	The Emperor's New Clothes	Dr. Lambert		
2005	Casanova	The Doge		
2006	Severance	Richard		
2008	The Devil's Whore	Joliffe		
2010	Black Death	Hob		
2011	Johnny English Reborn	Patch Quartermain		
2014	The Minister of Chance	The King		
2014	Automata	Vernon Conway		
2015	Spooks: The Greater Good	Oliver Mace		
2016	Eddie The Eagle	Target		
2017	The Hippopotamus	Oliver Mills		
2018	Agatha and the Truth of Murder	Randolph		
2018	Peterloo	Prince Regent		
2018	Sometimes Always Never	Arthur		
2019	Killers Anonymous	Calvin		
2019	The Aeronauts	Airy		
2022	Marooned Awakening	Karl	voice	
2022	Stromboli	Harold		
2024	The End	Butler		
2024	Gladiator II	Thraex		
2025	Grow	Lord Smyth-Gherkin		

Since 2012, McInnerny has been a patron of the Norwich Film Festival.

=== Radio ===
Year	Title	Role	Notes	Ref.
1998	Cider with Rosie	Laurie	By Nick Darke	
1999	The Saturday Play: Two Planks and a Passion	Earl of Oxford		
2001	Habbakuk of Ice	Geoffrey Pyke	by Steve Walker	
2004	The Odyssey	Odysseus	Adapted by Simon Armitage	
2010	I, Claudius	Tiberius		
2013	Headlong	Tony Churt		
2013	Kokomo	Pantalone	by Julian Simpson	
2015	Fugue State	Johnson	by Julian Simpson	
2017	Mythos	Johnson	by Julian Simpson	
2017	King Solomon's Mines	Allan Quatermain		
2022	Make Death Love Me	Antony		

=== Theatre ===
In 1985 he was cast in Pravda alongside Anthony Hopkins.

He played Dr Frank-N-Furter in the 1990 West End production of The Rocky Horror Show. His performance can be heard on the soundtrack album of this production.

In summer 2007, he played Iago in Othello at Shakespeare's Globe on Bankside in London.

Selected theatre performances

- Clitandre in The Misanthrope by Moliere. Directed by Casper Wrede at the Royal Exchange, Manchester (1981)
- Charlie in Detective Story by Sidney Kingsley. Directed by John Dillon at the Royal Exchange, Manchester (1982)
- Billy Bibbitt in One Flew Over The Cuckoo's Nest by Dale Wasserman. Directed by Greg Hersov at the Royal Exchange, Manchester (1982)
- Mick in The Caretaker by Harold Pinter. Directed by Richard Negri at the Royal Exchange, Manchester (1983)
- Orsino in Twelfth Night. Directed by Braham Murray at the Royal Exchange, Manchester (1988)

=== Music ===
In 1989, he co-starred with Kate Bush in the music video for her song "This Woman's Work". He also appeared in the Westlife video for "Uptown Girl", along with Claudia Schiffer, Robert Bathurst, Crispin Bonham-Carter, Ioan Gruffudd and James Wilby.
