= Patsy Byrne =

British actress (1933–2014)

- Born: Patricia Anne Thirza Byrne; 13 July 1933; Bexhill, Sussex, England
- Died: 17 June 2014 (aged 80); Denville Hall, Northwood, London, England
- Education: Rose Bruford College
- Occupation: Actress

Patricia Anne Thirza Byrne (13 July 1933 – 17 June 2014) was an English actress, best known for her role as "Nursie" in Blackadder II as well as Malcolm's domineering Mother, Mrs Stoneway in all seven series of the ITV comedy Watching between 1987 and 1993.

== Biography ==
Byrne was educated at Ashford County Grammar School. She studied drama at Rose Bruford College before joining the Royal Shakespeare Company playing parts such as Maria in Twelfth Night and Gruscha in The Caucasian Chalk Circle at the Aldwych Theatre in the early 1960s. In the 1980s she also worked at Chichester Festival Theatre.

Byrne appeared alongside Tony Robinson in a Series 3 episode of Maid Marian and her Merry Men. She played Betty the Tea Lady on the BBC children's programme Playdays. She also played Marge Stoneway, mother of Malcolm, in TV series Watching which ran from 1987 to 1993.

Other roles included appearances in I, Claudius (1976), Stealing Heaven (1988), Inspector Morse (1989), 2point4 Children (1991), Les Misérables (1998), David Copperfield (1999) and Kevin & Perry Go Large (2000), as well as numerous radio plays. Byrne performed in the 1990 BBC production of C. S. Lewis' The Silver Chair as the giant nanny in the city of the giants. In 1998 she played Martha Coutts in episode 19 of series 7 of Heartbeat.

== Death ==
Byrne died at Denville Hall, a retirement home for performers, on 17 June 2014.

== Selected filmography ==
Year	Title	Role	Notes
1957	BBC Sunday Night Theatre	Susan Barwell	"The Mayor's Nest"
1962	The Cherry Orchard	Dunyasha, the maid	TV play
1963	Espionage	Maid	"The Frantic Rebel"
1970	The Wednesday Play	Markenka	"The Cellar and the Almond Tree"
1970	Z Cars	Bessie Laidlaw/Mary Walker	2 episodes
1971	Doomwatch	Mary Franklin	Episode: "By the Picking of My Thumbs"
1972	The Alf Garnett Saga	Mrs. Frewin	
1972	The Ruling Class	Mrs. Pamela Treadwell	
1974	The Gathering Storm	Cook	TV movie
1976	I, Claudius	Martina	Episode: "Some Justice"
1977	Eleanor Marx	Lenchen	3 episodes (TV mini-series)
1977	Just William	Mrs. Coombe	Episode: "The Great Detective"
1978	All Creatures Great and Small	Mrs. Hammond	Episode: "A Dog's Life"
1978	The Class of Miss MacMichael	Mrs. Green	
1978	The Devil's Crown	Florence	3 episodes (TV mini-series)
1978	Hazell	Mrs. Dobson	Episode: "Hazell Settles the Accounts"
1979	My Son, My Son	Mrs. O'Riordan	1 episode
1979–1980	The Old Curiosity Shop	Mrs. Nubbles	4 episodes (TV mini-series)
1980	A Little Silver Trumpet	Mrs. Cleaver	5 episodes
1980–1984	The Setbacks	Lily Setback	17 episodes
1982	Britannia Hospital	Nurse	
1982	Educating Marmalade	MP's Nanny	Episode: "Nanny"
1982	The Return of the Soldier	Mrs. Plummer	
1982	Tales of the Unexpected	Jean	"The Absence of Emily"
1983–1984	Miracles Take Longer	Betty Hackforth	36 episodes
1984	Danger, Marmalade at Work	Miss Peach	Episode: "Social Worker"
1985	Bleak House	Mrs. Blinder	1 episode (TV mini-series)
1986	Blackadder II	Nursie	6 episodes
1986	Mr. Love	Mrs. Lunt	
1986	Screen Two	Mrs. Dempster	"Hotel du Lac"
1987	A Dorothy L. Sayers Mystery: "Strong Poison"	Mrs. Pettican	2 episodes (TV mini-series)
1987–1993	Watching	Mrs. Stoneway	50 episodes
1988	A Taste for Death	Millicent Gentle	2 episodes (TV mini-series)
1988	Hanna's War	Rosie	
1988	Stealing Heaven	Agnes	
1988	Blackadder's Christmas Carol	Nursie, Bernard	TV special
1988–1997	Playdays	Betty the Tealady	Series regular
1989	Inspector Morse	Mrs. Maltby	Episode: "The Ghost in the Machine"
1990	The Silver Chair	Giant Nanny	2 episodes (TV mini-series)
1992	2point4 Children	Peggy	Episode: "Thank You Lucky Stars"
1992	In Sickness and in Health	Mrs. Jones	1 episode
1992	Emily's Ghost	Mrs. Crabtree	
1992	Screen One	Sarah Stone	"Adam's Bede"
1993	The Higher Mortals	Matron	
1993	Maid Marian and Her Merry Men	Marian's Mum	Episode: "Keeping Mum"
1994	Hard Times	Old Woman	1 episode (TV mini-series)
1994	The Inspector Alleyn Mysteries	Mrs. Mitchell	Episode: "Hand in Glove"
1995	Casualty	Grace Kent	Episode: "Halfway House"
1996	The Treasure Seekers	Mrs. Nesbit	TV movie
1997	Bramwell	Mrs. Mills	1 episode
1997	Peak Practice	Mrs. Burns	Episode: "Lost Feelings"
1998	Heartbeat	Martha Coutts	Episode: "Appearances"
1998	Les Misérables	Toussaint	
1998	The Ruth Rendell Mysteries	Daisy Panick	Episode: "Road Rage – Part Two"
1999	Blackadder: Back & Forth	Nursie	
1999	David Copperfield	Mrs. Gummidge	2 episodes (TV mini-series)
2000	Kevin & Perry Go Large	Old lady	
2006	Holby City	Esme Taylor	Episode: "Into Your Own Hands"
