= The Archbishop =

- Blackadder episode
- Prince Edmund (Rowan Atkinson, right) conspires with Baldrick (Tony Robinson, left) and Lord Percy (Tim McInnerny, middle) to sell holy relics
- Episode no.: Series 1 Episode 3
- Written by: Rowan Atkinson; Richard Curtis
- Original air date: 29 June 1983

Episode chronology
← Previous "Born to Be King"	Next → "The Queen of Spain's Beard"

"The Archbishop" is the third episode of the first series of the BBC sitcom Blackadder (The Black Adder). It is set in England in the late 15th century, and follows the exploits of the fictitious Prince Edmund as he is invested as Archbishop of Canterbury amid a Machiavellian plot by the King to acquire lands from the Catholic Church. Most of the humour in the episode relies on religious satire.

The script pays tribute to the real-life 12th century Archbishop of Canterbury, Thomas Becket. Edmund, faced with the threat of assassination, attempts to escape to France into self-imposed exile; and in a later scene, two drunk knights overhear King Richard IV exclaiming "Who will rid me of this turbulent priest?", the words attributed to King Henry II which led to Becket's death in 1170, and embark on a mission to murder Edmund.

"The Archbishop" won an International Emmy Award in 1983 in the Popular Arts category.

The Catholic Church was to be satirized again in the second series, Blackadder II, in the 1986 episode "Money".

== Plot ==
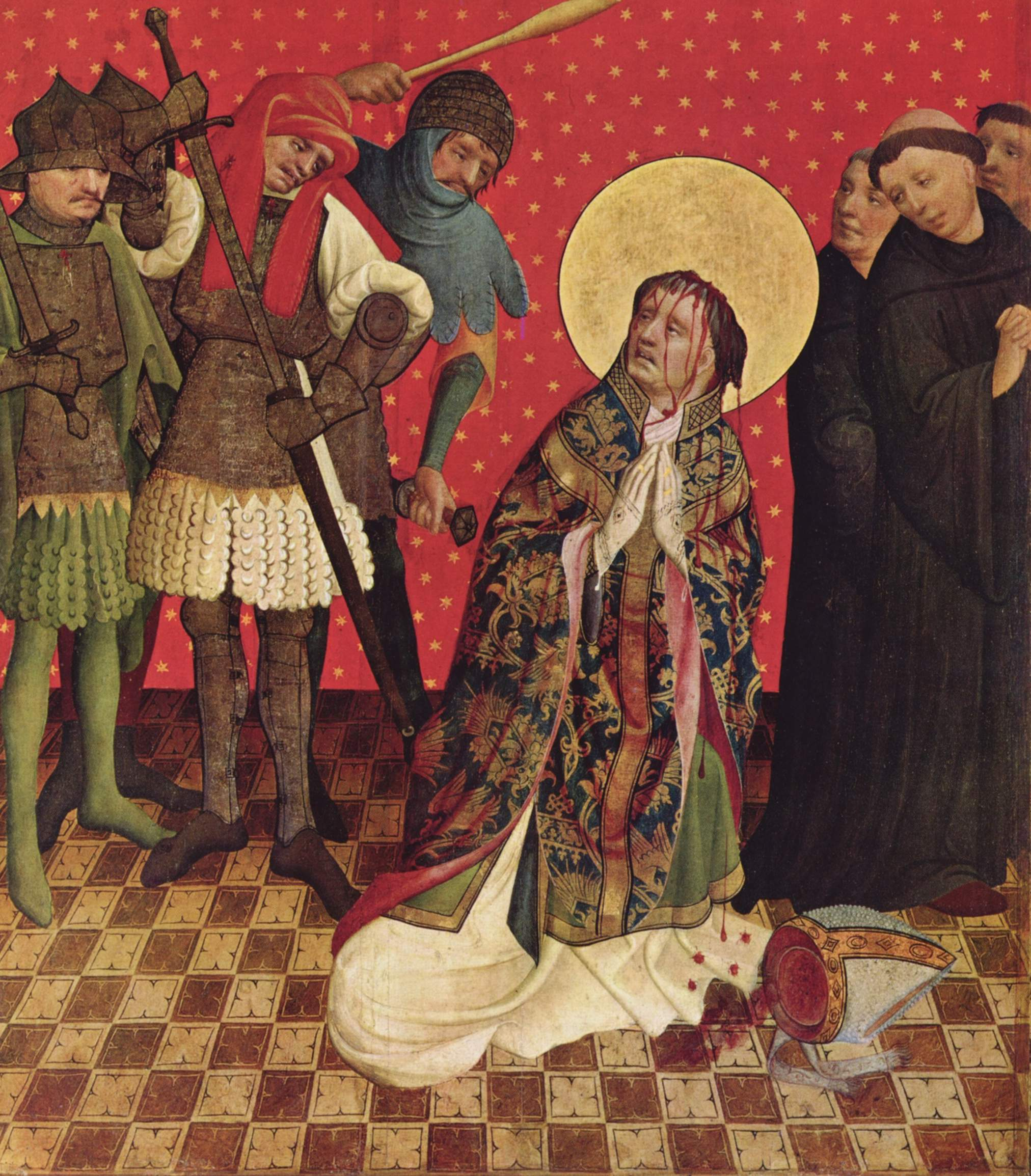
The episode references the death of Archbishop Thomas Becket in 1170

In November 1487, the Duke of Winchester, the greatest landowner in the kingdom, is on his deathbed, with King Richard and Godfrey, Archbishop of Canterbury, sitting beside him. Winchester initially plans to leave his lands to the Crown in his will, but Godfrey threatens him with the eternal torments of Hell unless he bequeaths his estate to the Catholic Church. Moments after the will is signed, Winchester dies, and his lands pass on to the Church. Enraged, the King has the Archbishop murdered.

Edmund learns of Archbishop Godfrey's death from his brother Harry and reflects on it scornfully with his companions Lord Percy Percy and Baldrick, remarking that Godfrey was the third archbishop in a year to suffer such a fate, sarcastically referring to the other absurdly obvious murders as "tragic accidents". Edmund then hears of a rumour that Harry is to be appointed as the new archbishop and speculates gleefully that his brother will also be brutally murdered, thus leaving Edmund next in line for the throne of England. The next day, to Edmund's horror, King Richard announces that he will be the new archbishop. Fearing for his life, Edmund tries to grovel his way out of the job, but Richard refuses, threatening to do to him "what God did unto the Sodomites" should he anger him.

Edmund attempts to flee to France with Baldrick and Percy, but is caught trying to escape by King Richard and Prince Harry, and claims he was going to Canterbury. Harry accompanies Edmund to Canterbury, where he is ordained as Archbishop of Canterbury and Primate of All England. Edmund takes on Baldrick as a monk and Percy is ordained as Bishop of Ramsgate. All three adopt clerical vestments and shave their heads with a tonsure.

Some time later, news arrives that the wealthy Lord Graveney is on his deathbed. Edmund, fearing reprisals from his father, rushes to Graveney's castle to convince him to leave his lands to the Crown. However, the Bishop of London (the former archbishop's brother) is already there, attempting to convince Graveney to bequeath his estate to the Church by threatening him with the pains of Hell, just as his brother had done with the dying Duke of Winchester earlier. Graveney confesses to Edmund that he fears damnation for his many sins, which include killing his father so he could have an affair with his own mother over one thousand times. Edmund convinces Graveney that if he were to go to Heaven he would spend eternity "singing, talking to God and watering pot plants", contrasting it with a picture of Hell as an opportunity to spend eternity indulging in fornication, murder and pillage. Excited by the prospect of eternal sin, Graveney deeds his lands to the Crown just before dying. In his joy, King Richard embraces Edmund and addresses him as "my son".

Later, Baldrick reveals a plan to profit from their ordination by commercialising religious artefacts – selling curses, papal pardons and religious artifacts. He proposes a new product line of holy relics including a set of Shrouds from Turin, a range of anachronistic gifts (such as a pipe racks or a coffee table) purportedly from the carpentry workshop of Jesus Christ, along with a variety of bones and other bodily parts of saints – all revealed to be counterfeit items produced by Baldrick himself. Despite his initial displeasure, Edmund starts to settle in as archbishop, given the benefits the position brings him: he is gaining great new wealth for himself and the crown, for the first time his father actually respects him, and even without needing to kill his brother he has already become a politically powerful man in his own right.

That night, King Richard and Queen Gertrude drink a toast to Edmund, and Richard remarks that he is grateful that he will never again have to say "who will rid me of this turbulent priest?" The end of the sentence is overheard by two drunken knights who take it literally as instructions to murder the current archbishop of Canterbury. The two assassins surprise Edmund, Baldrick and Percy and attempt to kill them. The trio escape by disguising themselves as nuns, for which they are caught by the Mother Superior. Edmund is promptly excommunicated by the pope (and also two other antipopes), and walks away into a bright, holy light – revealed to be the glow from the fire he set in the nunnery.

In the epilogue, the Mother Superior laments the corruption of the world, and suggestively informs another nun that she won't be needing "the unicorn" that evening – the true nature of which is not revealed.

== Production ==
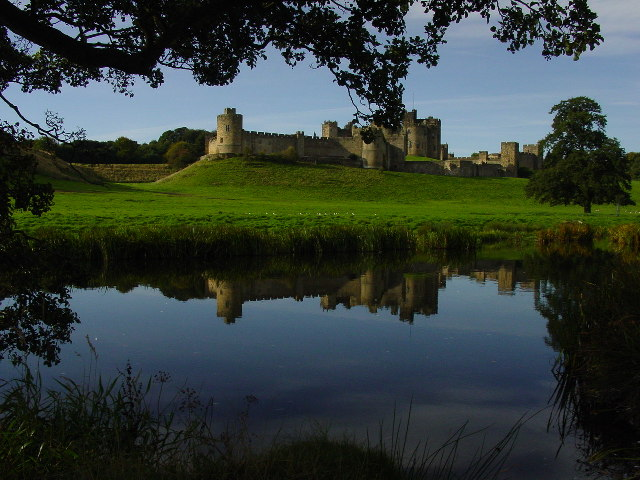
Alnwick Castle, Northumberland, used as a filming location for King Richard's castle

William Russell, best remembered as Doctor Who companion Ian Chesterton, was a last-minute replacement for actor Wilfrid Brambell in the role of the Duke of Winchester. Brambell walked off set after becoming impatient with delays in shooting the scene. Russell was credited as Russell Enoch.

Among the scenes cut from the final broadcast version of The Archbishop was a scene in which Prince Harry consults his newly consecrated brother on the pressing ecclesiastical issues of the day, such as the castration of choirboys and the torture of talkative women. Also cut from the programme was a valedictory soliloquy by Edmund as he prepares to go into exile, bidding farewell to the castle turrets, and King Richard preaching an angry sermon from the pulpit at the funeral of the dead Archbishop Godfrey.

Location shooting for King Richard's castle was at Alnwick Castle in Northumberland and the surrounding countryside in February 1983. Brinkburn Priory, an authentic reconstruction of a mediaeval monastery church, was used for the scenes of Edmund's consecration at Canterbury Cathedral.

== Critical assessment ==
The depiction of the medieval world in The Black Adder has been the subject of some critical commentary for drawing on popular perceptions of the period which are not always entirely accurate. While the series uses absurdly comic situations to mock religion and belief, the scripts of both The Archbishop and the later episode Witchsmeller Pursuivant have been attributed to a post-Reformation perception of Medieval Catholicism; Archbishops were not routinely assassinated and hysteria about witches was not widespread in England until the 1640s.

Reviewer Katherine J. Lewis draws similarities between Baldrick's relics scene and The Pardoner's Tale from Geoffrey Chaucer's Canterbury Tales, whose protagonist also has a trade in fake relics. While The Black Adder satirises the supposedly unquestioning credulity of the Mediaeval Christian, Lewis suggests that Chaucer's story, by offering a satirical commentary on the relic trade, shows that the teachings of the Church were open to question and ridicule even in the 14th century.

In the 2008 documentary Blackadder Rides Again, Richard Curtis and Tony Robinson both mention the relics scene as a particular highlight. Curtis was generally critical of the first series, stating that while comedy writers hone their craft first by writing sketches and then progress to writing situation comedy, the most successful parts of The Black Adder were in essence just sketches. He points to Baldrick's scene with the holy relics as an example of one of those sequences – entertaining, but ultimately self-contained. Robinson felt that, because he, Rowan Atkinson and Tim McInnerny had just begun to work together, this scene was the first time that the three of them truly "gelled" as an ensemble of performers.

== Cast ==
The closing credits of this episode list the cast members "in order of reverence".

- Paul McDowell as Herbert, Archbishop of Canterbury
- Arthur Hewlett as Godfrey, Archbishop of Canterbury and William, Bishop of London
- Tim McInnerny as Percy, Bishop of Ramsgate
- Joyce Grant as Mother Superior
- Carolyn Colquohoun as Sister Sara
- Robert East as Harry, Prince of Wales
- Elspet Gray as The Queen
- Russell Enoch as The Duke of Winchester
- Bert Parnaby as Cain, a Peasant
- Roy Evans as Abel, a Peasant
- David Nunn as the Messenger
- Bill Wallis as Sir Justin de Boinod
- David Delve as Sir George de Bouef
- Leslie Sands as Lord Graveney
- Tony Robinson as Brother Baldrick
- Brian Blessed as King Richard IV
- Rowan Atkinson as Edmund, Archbishop of Canterbury
