= The Queen of Spain's Beard =

- Blackadder episode
- Prince Edmund (Rowan Atkinson) meets the Spanish Infanta Maria Escalosa (Miriam Margolyes) for the first time
- Episode no.: Series 1 Episode 4
- Written by: Rowan Atkinson; Richard Curtis
- Original air date: 6 July 1983

Guest appearances
- Miriam Margolyes; Jim Broadbent

Episode chronology
← Previous "The Archbishop"	Next → "Witchsmeller Pursuivant"

"The Queen of Spain's Beard" is the fourth episode of season one in The Black Adder, a BBC's historical comedy franchise. Set in England, during a fictional historical era of the late 15th-century, the episode parodies the practise of intermarriage between the royal houses of European powers - which was a genuine and significant characteristic of European politics at that time. Its bawdy humour also deals with taboos surrounding premarital sex, gay stereotypes and the practise of child marriage. The title of the episode may allude to the words attributed to Sir Francis Drake who "singed the beard of the King of Spain" when he attacked the country in 1587.

As with other episodes in this series, the end credits include an acknowledgement of "additional dialogue by William Shakespeare". One scene includes a parody of Richard III in which the third messenger announces in deadpan style the death of Lord Wessex. The fictitious King Richard IV retorts, "I like not this news! Bring me some other news!" echoing Richard III's rebuke to a messenger, "There, take thou that till thou bring better news." (Act 4, scene 4)

The episode introduces a recurring guest star to the Blackadder series, Miriam Margolyes, who plays the part of the Spanish Infanta betrothed to Prince Edmund. Margolyes would later return to play Edmund's Puritan aunt, Lady Whiteadder, in the 1986 episode "Beer" and the part of Queen Victoria in Blackadder's Christmas Carol (1988). Margolyes's Infanta is accompanied in "The Queen of Spain's Beard" by an interpreter, played by Jim Broadbent, who would go on to play Prince Albert opposite her in Blackadder's Christmas Carol. Broadbent was also intended to play Lord Whiteadder in "Beer", but was unavailable for recording.

Although "The Queen of Spain's Beard" was originally broadcast as episode 4 of the series, on later broadcasts and DVD releases it has been switched with episode 2, "Born to Be King".

== Plot ==
The year is 1492 and Europe is in disarray as nations go to war and kingdoms rise and fall. In England, Richard IV's court throbs with activity as he and his noblemen plan for war. The King must secure Spain's allegiance in a war with France, and commands his son, Harry, Prince of Wales, to marry the Spanish Infanta. Harry reveals that he is already engaged to a long list of European princesses (and one prince), and so the duty falls to Richard's forgotten son, Edmund, Duke of Edinburgh.

Edmund, meanwhile, has been trying unsuccessfully to woo the ladies of the court. After a woman pushes him off the castle ramparts in revulsion because she was expecting Harry, Edmund renounces women. His resolve is weakened when he learns that his father has arranged his marriage to the Infanta Maria Escalosa of Spain and he grows excited when he imagines her as a beautiful princess. The Infanta arrives at court and Edmund is horrified to discover that she is ugly, morbidly obese, and sexually voracious. Facilitated by her ever-present and annoying interpreter, Don Speekingleesh, she declares undying love for Edmund. Terrified, Edmund retreats to work out a way of getting out of the marriage, which is to take place the following day.

In twenty-four hours, I'll be married to a walrus!

— Prince Edmund, after meeting the Infanta, "The Queen of Spain's Beard"

Baldrick hatches a plan: if Edmund can convince the Infanta that he "prefers the intimate company of men", she will not be willing to marry him. Baldrick suggests he follow the example of Earl of Doncaster, which Edmund is initially reticent to do until he realises that no one would ever marry the Earl of Doncaster except, perhaps, the Duke of Beaufort. Edmund then puts on flamboyant clothes and makeup, adopts stereotypically camp mannerisms and minces his way into court - only to be mistaken for the Earl of Doncaster by his father, and his brother to believe that his attire is part of his stag do. Unfortunately, the Infanta misunderstands Edmund's appearance as an attempt to wear traditional Spanish dress to delight her, and her lust for him is kindled further.

Edmund's next strategy is to get out of the marriage by marrying someone else. He sends Percy to find a suitable fiancée while Baldrick kidnaps a Roman Catholic priest to perform the ceremony. Edmund – still wearing his flamboyantly gay outfit – attempts to marry a giggling peasant girl named Tully Applebottom. After Tully mentions that she is already married, Edmund insists that the church be a "bit adaptable" and Baldrick coerces the priest to carry out the ceremony (who crosses his fingers behind his back to discount the marriage). The ceremony is abruptly halted by Tully's enraged husband, who ejects Edmund by threatening him with a scythe, assuming him to be the Earl of Doncaster.

On the eve of the wedding, Edmund's last hope is to make the Infanta lose her virginity, thus making her ineligible for marriage. He sends Baldrick into the Infanta's bedchamber to "deflower" her. In total darkness, Baldrick is heard struggling desperately, while the Infanta's lustful exclamations are helpfully translated for Baldrick by Don Speekingleesh. Edmund, feigning sorrow, informs King Richard that the Infanta is not a virgin. The King brushes the revelation aside, saying that he already knew – only one of them has to be a virgin (that one, of course, being Edmund).

The following day, the marriage ceremony begins and the Infanta is impatient. A traumatised Baldrick is shown covered in bruises from the previous night's tryst. Unexpectedly, the wedding is suddenly halted when news arrives that Spain, Switzerland, and France have joined forces. Realising that the only country in Europe England can ally with now is Hungary, the King ejects the Infanta from the court, and declares that Edmund must now marry a Hungarian princess. Edmund is disappointed once again — Princess Leia of Hungary turns out to be an eight-year-old girl. The wedding goes ahead, and Edmund spends his entire wedding night wearily reading fairy tales to his child bride.

== Cast ==
The closing credits of this episode list the cast members "in affable order".

- Rowan Atkinson as Edmund, Duke of Edinburgh
- Brian Blessed as King Richard IV
- Elspet Gray as The Queen
- Robert East as Harry, Prince of Wales
- Tim McInnerny as Percy
- Tony Robinson as Baldrick
- Miriam Margolyes as Infanta Maria Escalosa of Spain
- Jim Broadbent as Don Speekingleesh, an interpreter
- Jane Freeman as Tully Applebottom
- John Rapley as Rev. Lloyd
- Howard Lew Lewis as Mr. Applebottom
- Stephen Tate as Lord Chiswick
- Kenn Wells as the 1st Messenger
- Richard Mitchley as the 2nd Messenger
- David Nunn as the 3rd and 4th Messengers
- Willoughby Goddard as the Archbishop
- Natasha King as Princess Leia of Hungary
- Harriet Keevil as Lady on Ramparts

== Production ==
Miriam Margolyes spoke of her enjoyment during the production of "The Queen of Spain's Beard", and was happy to take on role of a fat, hideously ugly Infanta as she held the cast and production team in such affection. It was her first collaboration with Rowan Atkinson, and she expressed admiration that he was able to overcome his stammer and perform as an actor.

Jim Broadbent, who was cast in the role of the Spanish interpreter, had previously worked with Atkinson on Not the Nine O'Clock News. His performance was singled out by writer Richard Curtis as particularly memorable. Broadbent later confessed that he had no idea at the time what a Spanish accent should sound like, and improvised with "a very bad cod Italian accent" — which turned out in the end to be a very successful comedic strategy. Curtis remarked that it was an "astonishing technical feat, to get the rhythms of the English language so completely wrong."

Natasha King (Princess Leia of Hungary) has remarked on the kindness of the cast and crew to her as a child actor and recalled that, at the end of filming, Rowan Atkinson presented her with a bouquet of flowers.

== Critical assessment ==
In her assessment of The Black Adder series, the critic Katharine J. Lewis has examined its comedy genre. She cites several aspects of this episode in particular as elements of traditional situation comedy: the use of scheming, plotting and disguises; and the creation of exaggerated, stereotypical characters (such as the sexually voracious Infanta) for comedic effect. However, Lewis points to its connections with the alternative comedy scene which was growing in the 1980s – Rowan Atkinson, Richard Curtis and John Lloyd had all collaborated on Not the Nine O'Clock News and several actors from the alternative comedy circuit had cameos throughout the series. The Black Adder is said to draw on the controversial and irreverent material of previous alternative comedy productions to lampoon the customs and practices of the mediaeval world.

== See also ==
- British-Spanish relations
