= List of Blackadder characters =

Main characters from Blackadder Goes Forth: Darling (left), Melchett (centre), George Colthurst (right), Baldrick (bottom right), Blackadder (bottom left)

This article lists the characters in the four series and three special episodes of the British sitcom Blackadder. Blackadder was notable for featuring actors playing many repeating characters across different eras of history, with Rowan Atkinson as the central character Edmund Blackadder, and Tony Robinson as his sidekick Baldrick, together with numerous other actors in one-off parts.

== Main characters ==
=== Edmund Blackadder ===
- Prince Edmund "The Black Adder" (1): The least intelligent (while highest-ranked) of the Blackadder clan depicted in the series. He is very cowardly and often does not think things through. He despises but fears his family, and dislikes Lord Percy. His closest friend (arguably) is Baldrick, his manservant. On becoming Prince, he initially wants to be called "the Black Vegetable", before Baldrick convinces him it is a bad idea (read, Baldrick suggests "the Black Adder" and he acted as if it was his idea). He accidentally kills his great-uncle, King Richard III, and is repeatedly visited by his ghost. He becomes Duke of Edinburgh and Lord of the Privy. It is a moot point as to whether or not he was the blood-son of the new king or the result of his mother maybe having an affair. At one point he becomes the Archbishop of Canterbury, but is eventually fired (to his relief). He has an arranged marriage to the nine-year-old Princess Leia of Hungary, which displeases him. He possibly has some witch blood in him, as his mother had learnt voodoo-esque magic. He is eventually dethroned as Duke of Edinburgh and gathers the other six most evil men in all England to form the Black Seal. They plan to kill the rest of the royal family and claim the throne, but instead betrayed Edmund, too. He is wounded after being tied to a torture chair, which mutilates his ears, hands and private parts. All his family and the Black Seal mistakenly drink poison and die, making Edmund king, but for all of thirty seconds as he also drinks the poison and dies.
- Edmund, Lord Blackadder (2): The great-grandson of Prince Edmund, Lord Blackadder is in the service of Queen Elizabeth I. He is one of the queen's favourites, but is all too keenly aware of the limitations of this position (on several occasions she threatens to cut his head off, and quite happily teams up with Melchett to play practical jokes on him). He despises Lord Percy even more than his predecessor did, and thinks of Baldrick as a stupid animal, though he does not physically abuse him as his descendants do. He and Melchett dislike but tolerate one another. Lord Blackadder spends most of his time dodging death, in a variety of forms and from a variety of sources. During his stint as High Executioner, for example, he executed the wrong man at the wrong time, thereby facing a death warrant from the Queen. On another occasion, he was unable to pay back a £1,000 loan that he had taken from the Black Monks, and was threatened with being impaled by the baby-eating Bishop of Bath and Wells. He spent two years sailing the seas with Captain Rum, seeking a route around the Cape of Good Hope, but nearly died when he discovered that the captain has no crew and no ability to navigate a ship. He is eventually murdered (along with everybody else in the court) by Prince Ludwig the Indestructible.
- Mr. E. Blackadder, Esquire (3), The Butler to the Prince Regent. He is devious, cheeky and probably the most intelligent of all the Blackadders. He has problems keeping the Prince Regent (the later George IV) out of trouble. George is easy to trick and scam; Blackadder makes quite a profit out of selling George's possessions, such as socks, when he is not looking. He treats Baldrick with a great deal of contempt, and frequently physically abuses him. Always looking for a way to improve his position, Mr. Blackadder finally gets his chance when George is challenged to a duel by the renowned swordsman, the Duke of Wellington. He switches clothes with the Prince Regent, and is defeated by Wellington, but survives thanks to a conveniently placed cigarette box that Wellington had given to him. Wellington takes this a sign that God is preserving the prince for greater things, and then murders "the butler" (George in disguise), feeling insulted by his disrespectful behaviour, leaving Blackadder free to continue posing as the Prince Regent. It should, perhaps, be noted that this is the only incarnation of Blackadder who we do not actually see killed at the conclusion of the series. It can be safely assumed that he went on to become King, since the TV film of the series, Blackadder Back & Forth eventually mentions King Edmund III.
- Captain Edmund Blackadder (4), a disillusioned and cynical British Army Captain. He joined the army in the late 19th century and earned his stripes in the battle of Mboto Gorge in 1892, where he claims the army fought "pygmies armed with sharpened kiwi fruit and mangoes". He therefore finds the prospect of fighting against armed soldiers who could actually kill him both distasteful and stupid. When the First World War started, he was sent to the trenches with Private Baldrick and Lieutenant George, both of whom he considers idiots but seems to have a genuine affection for. His service is further plagued by General Melchett, a maniac with seemingly no common sense or concern for the men under him, and Captain Kevin Darling, a short-tempered, by the books officer, who panders to Melchett in the hope of staying far away from the front line. Blackadder generally misses no opportunity to mock Darling's name and take him down a peg in Melchett's eyes. Captain Blackadder is a stone-cold realist and knows that if he and his men are sent "over the top", most or all of them will die, and he therefore spends much of his time coming up with plans to avoid this possibility. In the end he, Baldrick, George and Darling are, in fact, sent over the top. To the sound of a slow, minimal piano version of the title theme, the four are seen in slow-motion, charging into the fog and smoke of no man's land, with gunfire and explosions all around, before the scene fades into footage of a sunny poppy field and the sound of birdsong. The fate of the four is left ambiguous.
- Sir Edmund Blackadder (The Cavalier Years): A cavalier during the English Civil War who risks his property and life by his fidelity to the defeated King Charles I. When Baldrick fails to hide Charles from Oliver Cromwell's Roundheads, Sir Edmund struggles to plan an escape as the King's execution draws closer. Baldrick takes up the offer of £1000 for executing the King, but Sir Edmund, initially enraged by this betrayal, declares he will do it himself. Just before the execution, Charles mistakes Sir Edmund's intentions for a cunning plan to trick Cromwell and allow Charles and his son, the future Charles II, to flee to France. Knowing he cannot admit to his greed, Sir Edmund panics and puts forward Baldrick's suggestion for saving the King: cut off a pumpkin passed off as Charles' head. Later, with his house surrounded by the Roundheads, Sir Edmund declares he must fight for his future sovereign, but, not being a man of honour, disguises himself as a Roundhead and denounces Baldrick as "royalist scum".
- Ebenezer Blackadder (Blackadder's Christmas Carol): The proprietor of a "moustache shop", aided by Baldrick, from which he makes a modest living every year. He is the nicest man in all England, giving away all of his money and property to anyone claiming to be in need. Of course, all his friends and neighbours see him as an easy touch and take full advantage of him, shamefully. For once (since the first Baldrick), this Baldrick seems to be the more intelligent of the two, as he tries to convince Blackadder not to give so freely. One Christmas Eve, after giving away the year's profits, the Christmas tree, the modest Christmas gifts, and even his tiny turkey to a slew of greedy visitors, Blackadder is visited by a friendly spirit. The spirit inadvertently shows this Blackadder how his predecessors behaved and that his descendants will suffer if he continues to be so self-sacrificing, and how they will come to rule the galaxy if he changes his ways. Not a fool, Ebenezer decides to embark on a new way of life immediately. When Queen Victoria and Prince Albert come to grant him money and titles due to his kindness, he insults them, not realising they are the real Queen and consort, and in doing so loses out on fortune and wealth in his personal lifetime.
- Lord Edmund Blackadder / King Edmund III (Back and Forth): A modern-day trickster and a charmer. On the eve of the year 2000, he invites his friends over for dinner, intending to make money off them through an elaborate practical joke. Using what he claims are plans from one of Leonardo da Vinci's notebooks, he has Baldrick build a time machine; he then bets his friends that he can go back in time and obtain any object they desire. To his surprise, the time machine, intended as a prop, actually works, and he winds up changing history. Blackadder is later revealed, after altering history one last time, to be the absolute monarch King Edmund III, with Baldrick as his puppet Prime Minister and with Maid Marian (from the Robin Hood legend) revealed to become his queen and bride as Queen Marian of Sherwood.

=== Baldrick ===
Baldrick is the name of several characters throughout the series. Each one serves as Blackadder's servant and sidekick and acts as a foil to the lead character. Baldrick is the only character besides Blackadder himself to appear in all installments of the series, and can arguably be seen as Blackadder's best friend despite Blackadder's apparent contempt for him.

=== Lord Percy Percy ===
Lord Percy Percy (Tim McInnerny) is the name given to a pair of related characters. The Lord Percy of Blackadder II is the descendant of that seen in The Black Adder. The character derives his name from the real Percy family. Unlike the first two Blackadders and Baldricks, the two Lord Percys are almost identical; both are portrayed as dim-witted, gullible and foppish. In the first series, Percy is Duke of Northumberland, while in the second he is heir to the title. The title of Duke of Northumberland was not in fact held by a real person surnamed Percy until 1766, when Hugh Percy, born Hugh Smithson, was awarded the title, although the title of the Earl of Northumberland was granted to a Percy in 1377.

- The Black Adder – Percy is introduced in the first series as Percy, the Duke of Northumberland. In the first series, Percy accompanies both Prince Edmund and Baldrick on all their journeys. At one point, Percy becomes the bishop of Ramsgate when Edmund becomes the Archbishop of Canterbury; he also believes he has a finger bone belonging to Jesus Christ. However, Baldrick informs him that it is a fake by displaying his own collection of ten other "Jesus fingers". In the episode "The Black Seal", Percy accidentally puts poison in the castle's entire wine supply while trying to rescue Prince Edmund from a group of maniacs. While rescuing Edmund, Percy inevitably kills him and the whole royal court when they drink the tainted wine. Percy and Baldrick run in and futilely shout, "Don't drink the wine!" immediately after.
- Blackadder II – In this series, Lord Percy Percy is once again portrayed as a stupid "upper-class twit". Percy has a much larger role in series two, however; this is illustrated by his almost total involvement in all of Blackadder's pursuits (whether or not Blackadder actually welcomes his input). Percy is (among other things) temporarily the best man at Blackadder's wedding, assistant Lord High Executioner and a shipmate on Blackadder's ill-fated voyage to France (despite a pronounced aquaphobia stemming from a childhood incident where he was "savaged by a turbot"). At one point, while trying to master alchemy in an afternoon, Percy creates a green substance that Edmund sarcastically calls "Green" and attempts to turn it into something valuable. He is shown to have a terrible record with women; whilst the occasional girlfriend is mentioned, he is more often seen using rather unconvincing chat-up lines on various females (including Blackadder's married Puritan aunt), and, at one point, Baldrick, who was wearing a wig and a dress while acting as a bridesmaid. Percy promptly falls in love with him, not recognising Baldrick and even kissing him. Like the rest of the court, Percy dies at the end of the Blackadder II series finale episode, "Chains" at the hands of the psychopathic German Prince Ludwig the Indestructible (Hugh Laurie).
- Blackadder the Third - The episode Nob and Nobility features McInnerny portraying a French aristocrat by the name Le Comte de Frou Frou, who in the last act is revealed to be a false persona of the masked vigilante going by the name of Scarlet Pimpernel. McInnerny's portrayal of the Pimpernel follows largely that of Percy, with his true identity being Sir Percy Blakeney in the Baroness Orczy novels where the character originates from.

=== Melchett ===
Melchett (Stephen Fry) is a family line. There were two main Melchetts: Lord Melchett and General Melchett.

- Blackadder II – The first Melchett appeared in series two of Blackadder. He is Lord Chamberlain to Queen Elizabeth I. Affectionately known to the Queen as "Melchy", the earnest Lord Melchett has set himself up as her closest personal advisor and is always close to her. He guards his position jealously and is always doing his best to please the Queen. Melchett attends the Annual Communion Wine-Tasting and is also able to officiate at marriage ceremonies, two facts which suggest that he has a career in the church alongside his duties to the Queen. Like the rest of the court, Melchett was killed at the end of the Blackadder II series finale episode, "Chains" by the psychopathic German Prince Ludwig the Indestructible, a master of disguise, Ludwig being played by Fry's comedy partner, Hugh Laurie.
- Blackadder Goes Forth – The Melchett dynasty has changed quite a bit in Blackadder Goes Forth; rather than being the snivelling, slimy, reserved, intelligent, obsequious sycophant that the Elizabethan era Lord Melchett was, General Sir Anthony Cecil Hogmanay Melchett, VC KCB DSO is a loud, childish, unintelligent, incompetent, pompous warmonger who appears in the fourth series. The General Melchett character appearing in Blackadder Goes Forth reflects the popular caricature of First World War generals in that his preferred battle tactics and general attitudes towards warfare are stuck firmly in a bygone era. Melchett fails to understand or comprehend the basic concepts of modern trench warfare and is totally unable to come up with a new strategy that would suit it. Instead he continuously sends his men to a senseless death with seemingly no tactics at all. In "Goodbyeee", Melchett also remarks that he is a General with a "dicky heart" and a "wooden bladder". In the specials, Blackadder: the Whole Rotten Saga and Blackadder's Most Cunning Moments, Fry also revealed that the Melchett of Blackadder Goes Forth was much more aggressive, powerful and more insane than the Melchett of Blackadder II and that Melchett's "Baaaah!" is caused by him having haemorrhoids.

Melchett shared the trademark bellow "Baaah!" with Fry's earlier portrayal of Wellington, which would be delivered at random intervals for no apparent reason. In a BBC Four interview broadcast on 17 August 2007, Fry goes into some depth on the "odd history" of Melchett's "Baaah!", explaining that it began as early as his work in student productions of Shakespeare at Queens' College, Cambridge, where he would produce strange noises in order to amuse the audience. He also notes that Melchett's "Baaah!" can be found (although in a more subtle form) in his other acting work such as Peter's Friends.

In April 2020, Fry reprised his role as a descendant of Lord Melchett for The Big Night In, a telethon held during the COVID-19 pandemic, in a skit which he held a video call with Prince William, Duke of Cambridge, who made a surprise appearance.

=== George ===
George (Hugh Laurie) appears in Blackadder the Third as the Prince Regent; Lt. The Hon. George Colthurst St Barleigh, an overexcited and keen young lieutenant in Blackadder Goes Forth; and Major George Bufton-Tufton, Viscount Bufton-Tufton and Roman consul Georgius in Blackadder: Back & Forth.

=== Darling ===
Introduced in its fourth iteration, Blackadder Goes Forth, Captain Kevin Darling (Tim McInnerny) is main character Captain Edmund Blackadder (Rowan Atkinson)'s intellectual peer and bitter rival (just like Melchett was in season 2); while Blackadder reluctantly serves in World War I trenches, Darling is safely stationed some distance from the front line. Darling is the sycophantic adjutant to Stephen Fry's General Melchett. The character was originally conceived as "Captain Cartwright"; writers Ben Elton and Richard Curtis were simply unable to think of a more amusing name for him. Eventually however, Stephen Fry suggested "Darling" would be a more comedic alternative; the series makes use of a recurring joke where his name is used or referred to for comedic effect.

==== Awards and decorations ====
In the series, Captain Darling is seen wearing the following ribbons:

Military Cross	Queen's South; Africa Medal	1914 Star	Croix de Guerre (France)

Although Darling only features as a main character for one series of the original Blackadder run, several of his ancestors and descendants are also portrayed by McInnerny, in keeping with the series' ongoing motif of identical descendants. The Blackadder feature-length special Blackadder: Back & Forth (1999) introduced descendant character Archdeacon Darling, on better terms with the contemporary Blackadder. The time travel narrative of the special also allowed writers to introduce more historical Darlings to the series' chronology: the Duke of Darling, aide to the Duke of Wellington (Fry), and the Duc de Darling, assistant to Napoleon I (Simon Russell Beale). The final Darling, however, is also a Blackadder and was portrayed by Atkinson in BBC promotional materials in 2002; the name Sir Osmond Darling-Blackadder suggests an unknown familial union between Blackadders and Darlings at some point in their histories.

=== Queenie ===
"Queenie" (Miranda Richardson) is a caricature of the historical figure Queen Elizabeth I of England featured in Blackadder II. Though she is only twice referred to as "Queenie" in the series, this name is commonly used by the general public. In contrast to the usual regal and austere depiction of Elizabeth I, Miranda Richardson's portrayal is childish, spoiled and silly, possessing a fiery temper. Amanda Barrie's portrayal of Cleopatra in the 1964 film Carry On Cleo as a childish seductress has been suggested as an inspiration for Richardson's interpretation of Elizabeth I. It has been remarked that Queenie closely resembles the character Violet Elizabeth Bott featured in the Just William books of Richmal Crompton.

In Blackadder's Christmas Carol, Richardson appears as Queenie and the future Queen Asphyxia. In Blackadder: Back & Forth, she appears as present day Lady Elizabeth and Queenie.

Queenie's immature behaviour is expressed in her desire to "get squiffy and seduce nobles" (and extort extravagant presents from them on pain of death). A naughty schoolgirl at heart, Queenie loves to party, play games and get drunk. If anyone fails to laugh at her jokes, they risk execution, but, to her followers' bemusement and frustration, she sometimes tires of their toadying and welcomes a more cynical approach – which is why she prefers Edmund Blackadder to Lord Melchett. Like Blackadder and the rest of her court, Queenie is later murdered at the hands of the evil Prince Ludwig the Indestructible, (Hugh Laurie), a German master of disguise who presumably after stealing her identity goes on to kill the remaining members of the court including Blackadder and Melchett before going on to rule England as Queen off-screen during the Blackadder II series finale episode, "Chains".

Richardson appears in later series as characters not explicitly stated as being descendants of Elizabeth I, who had no known offspring (but may share common ancestors with her). In the fifth episode of Blackadder the Third, she plays Amy Hardwood, the seemingly-delicate wealthy industrialist's daughter, whom the Prince Regent courts to get out of serious debt with her dowry, later revealed as a highwayman, the Shadow; and in the episode "General Hospital" of the fourth series, she plays Nurse Mary Fletcher-Brown who enjoys a fling with Blackadder, before being accused of being a German spy.

=== Bob ===
Bob is a pseudonym used by two characters, both female, both pretending to be male and both played by Gabrielle Glaister.

- Blackadder II – Kate, who goes by the pseudonym "Bob", is one of the first characters to appear in Blackadder II. She is a somewhat naive young woman who insists on believing her mother is dead, despite her father's insistence that she ran off with his brother. Her aging father informs her that due to his imminent dotage he must look to his daughter to sustain him, and suggests that the best way is for her to become a prostitute, which she refuses. After arriving in London, she disguises herself as a man and is hired as a manservant by Lord Blackadder, who casually kicks Baldrick out on to the streets. However, when Blackadder points out that "Kate" is a girl's name, she quickly claims it is short for "Bob". Blackadder becomes increasingly concerned about the attraction he feels for the boy. Eventually, after being prescribed a course of leeches by a doctor and an attempt to throw Bob out, he learns the truth (after Kate opens her doublet in front of him), and within several minutes they have had sex and become engaged. However, at the wedding, Kate is seduced by Blackadder's best man, Lord Flashheart, and decides to run off with him, leaving Blackadder jilted at the altar.
- Blackadder Goes Forth – The episode "Major Star" introduces General Melchett's driver, Bob Parkhurst. Captain Blackadder recognises Bob's gender immediately. She begs Blackadder not to give her away, explaining that all her brothers have signed up, and she wants "to see how a war is fought, so badly". While Blackadder is not fooled, Lieutenant George is, failing to spot the truth even when she emerges from the shower wearing only a towel. So is Melchett, who, while attracted to the singer Gorgeous Georgina (utterly failing to recognise Lieutenant George in drag), is outraged when she is replaced by Bob whom he believes to be in drag herself. In "Private Plane", she appears to have revealed the truth to Melchett, as she is shown dressed in a female uniform and goes by the name "Bobbie", but still serves as Melchett's driver. As the Women's Army Auxiliary Corps was founded in 1917, Bob may have learned of its formation after the events of "Major Star", confessed her true sex and asked for a transfer to the WAAC. As in Blackadder II, she is seduced by Squadron Commander the Lord Flashheart, and runs off with him, much to Blackadder's annoyance.
- Upstart Crow – Glaister again played Bob, now judge Robert Roberts, in the sixth episode of Ben Elton's 2016 sitcom about William Shakespeare.

=== Lord Flashheart ===
Lord Flashheart (Rik Mayall) is the name of two characters. The first Lord Flashheart appeared in a scene of the first episode of the second series of Blackadder. His descendant, Squadron Commander the Lord Flashheart, appeared as a major character in the fourth series in an episode called "Private Plane". In the credits of this episode the name Flashheart is spelled Flasheart.

Lord Flashheart is boisterous and an arrogant womaniser, attractive to all the women he meets. He is extremely popular among his peers and becomes the centre of attention whenever he enters a room, usually by bursting through a door in a spectacular fashion. The two Flashhearts are stereotypes of a certain kind of hero (the Elizabethan swashbuckler and the World War I flying ace), slanted to emphasise the negative qualities associated with such characters such as narcissism, sexism and promiscuity. His catchphrases are "Woof!" and "Let's do-oo-ooooo it!", while suggestively thrusting his pelvis. He commonly uses sexual innuendo in ordinary conversation, for example, "Am I pleased to see you, or did I just put a canoe in my pocket?" Rik Mayall later recalled, "I was surprised when they asked me. Very honouring that they asked me. 'Alright,' I said, 'I'll do it, as long as I get more laughs than Rowan.'"

The writing for Lord Flashheart seems to have been at least in part inspired by George MacDonald Fraser’s adaptation of Harry Flashman.

The character of Robin Hood in Blackadder: Back and Forth, also played by Mayall, is essentially another version of Flashheart, with the same personality and mannerisms.

In Ben Elton's 2016 sitcom Upstart Crow, Tim Downie's character Christopher Marlowe resembles Flashheart.

== Non-recurring major characters ==
=== King Richard IV of England ===
King Richard IV (Brian Blessed) is the father of Prince Harry and Prince Edmund Plantagenet ("The Black Adder") and features in the first series. The character is very loosely based on the historical figure Richard of Shrewsbury, 1st Duke of York, one of the Princes in the Tower who disappeared in 1483 (as the real-life Richard would have been approximately twelve if still alive in 1485). In the alternate chronology of The Black Adder, King Richard III of England (played by Peter Cook) is introduced as being a "kind and thoughtful man" who cherishes his nephews (the two princes) placed into his care, in contrast to the common historical portrait of Richard III as an usurper who likely murdered the princes. Richard, Duke of York grew into "a big strong boy" (the fate of his elder brother, Edward V of England, is left unmentioned), and becomes his uncle's favourite, reflected by his being seated at the side of the king at the banquet on the eve of the Battle of Bosworth Field, which is a victory for the House of York during the Wars of the Roses. Richard is crowned King Richard IV of England after Richard III is accidentally killed by Edmund, and though he by far favours Harry over Edmund, he gradually comes to appreciate Edmund as a loyal son, and is genuinely saddened by Edmund's imminent death in the final episode (unaware that Edmund had tried and failed to overthrow him). As he drinks a toast to his dying son's honour, he and the entire royal court are killed after Lord Percy poisoned the entire vat of wine in an exaggerated attempt to kill the Black Seal, a group of assassins led by Edmund's archenemy.

=== Gertrude of Flanders ===
Gertrude of Flanders (Elspet Gray) is the wife of King Richard of England, Scotland and Ireland and mother of Princes Harry and Edmund. In attitude, Gertrude is mostly distant and absent-minded. She had an affair with a Scottish laird, which may have resulted in Edmund's birth. She often gives Edmund unwanted advice and embarrasses him. Her character's name is never spoken in dialogue in Blackadder, but appears in the credits. She is also a skilled practitioner of witchcraft, which she uses to help Edmund escape execution. But she, along with her royal family, is killed in the series' finale, after drinking wine poisoned by Lord Percy.

=== Harry, Prince of Wales ===
Henry "Harry" Plantagenet, Prince of Wales (1460–1498) (Robert East) was a main supporting character in The Black Adder (series 1). His Royal titles were the Prince of Wales, Captain of the Guard, Grand Warden of the Northern and Eastern Marches, Chief Lunatic of the Duchy of Gloucester, Viceroy of Wales, Sheriff of Nottingham, Marquess of the Midlands, Lord Po-Maker-In-Ordinary, and Harbinger of the Doomed Rat. A member of the House of York, Harry is the first son of King Richard IV of England (Brian Blessed) and Queen consort Gertrude of Flanders (Elspet Gray) and grandnephew of Richard III (Peter Cook). He has a younger brother (possibly his half-brother), Prince Edmund, Duke of Edinburgh (Rowan Atkinson).

The first portrayal of Prince Harry in the Blackadder story world was in the pilot episode which was shot in 1982 but not broadcast until 2023. In this episode, which is set sometime during the Elizabethan Era, Harry's character is one of two sons of the King and Queen of England. Although monarchs are not explicitly named, Harry may be intended as a fictional offspring of Queen Elizabeth I. This version of the character was played by the actor Robert Bathurst. Prince Harry made his first televised appearance (played by Robert East) in episode 1 of The Black Adder, entitled "The Foretelling", in which the events of the first series are set up by rewriting a period of English history and telling the story of a fictional ruling monarch who succeeds Richard III after the Battle of Bosworth Field.

=== Nursie ===
Nursie (Patsy Byrne), real name "Bernard", appears in all six episodes of Blackadder II and two of the Blackadder specials; Blackadder's Christmas Carol and Blackadder: Back & Forth. Once Queenie's childhood nurse, by the time of her appearances in Blackadder II, Nursie is either senile or otherwise irreversibly stupid, but remains at court at the side of the Queen for unknown reasons (possibly being kept-on as a lady's companion, though her continued presence at "Queenie's" side reinforces her portrayal as 'childish'), as the Queen repeatedly treats Nursie with contempt. Nursie frequently embarrasses both the Queen and herself by openly recounting tales of the Queen's childhood, prompting Queenie's standard reply of "Shut up, Nursie." She is also known for her complete non sequiturs in conversation. Lord Blackadder describes her as "a sad, insane old woman with an udder fixation." In the series' finale episode, "Chains", she is killed by Prince Ludwig the Indestructible (Hugh Laurie) along with the entire main cast. In Blackadder's Christmas Carol, a vision of the future depicts her as the silliest of Queen Asphyxia XIX's triple husbandoid.

Byrne later said that she was sometimes asked – in reference to a scene in the final episode of Blackadder II – whether she kept the cow costume in her wardrobe. She did not.

The real life basis for Nursie was Queen Elizabeth's real governesses, Kat Ashley, Margaret Bryan and Blanche Parry.

=== Prince Ludwig the Indestructible ===
Prince Ludwig the Indestructible (Hugh Laurie) appears in "Chains", the final episode of Blackadder II, as the main antagonist and the final villain of the entire "Blackadder II" series. He is a German master of disguise who kidnaps Lord Blackadder and Lord Melchett in 1566 and imprisons them in his dungeon under the watch of two German guards who carried out the abduction and a Spanish inquisitorial co-conspirator. He had previously befriended Blackadder, Melchett and Queenie while disguised as other individuals, including Big Sally (a waitress at a pub in Dover), Fluffy (a sheep) and an unnamed stable boy. In his childhood his mother forced him to wear shorts at school. He also had dirty hair and spots. He was therefore bullied by his classmates, who gave him the nickname, "Shorty Greasy Spot-Spot". He despises the name to such an extent that he flies into a rage whenever it is mentioned in his presence. As a result, he became a power-hungry megalomaniac, determined to fulfil his goal of becoming King of England by any means necessary. Once his men capture Blackadder and Melchett, he keeps them imprisoned in a dungeon, and sends a message to Queenie, giving her a week to decide whom she will save by paying the ransom. However, when the message arrives, Ludwig reveals that Queenie has in fact decided to keep the money and hold a big party instead, much to Blackadder's shock and Ludwig's disappointment. Blackadder and Melchett soon play ball, agreeing to give Ludwig information on how to infiltrate Richmond Palace and kill Queenie. Ludwig therefore changes their original death sentences to life imprisonment. After he departs, Blackadder and Melchett soon work together to outwit his guards, travelling back to England just in time for the costume party, where Blackadder exposes Ludwig who was posing as a cow; Blackadder realised that Ludwig's cow outfit was too good, while Nursie who always went as a cow had an udder fixation. When Ludwig attempts to flee while swearing he'll exact his revenge, Blackadder informs him that he will die and be buried, and throws a dagger at Ludwig that presumably either kills or wounds him off-screen, as the rest of the group celebrate the fact that Ludwig has been defeated. However, after the end credits have aired, it is revealed that Ludwig has resurfaced and, now disguised as Queenie after murdering her, has gone on to kill the entire main cast by using a dagger to cut their throats although it is implied that he broke Blackadder's neck or strangled or suffocated Melchett. Ludwig is regarded as the most serious villain in the Blackadder franchise, having successfully murdered the main cast as well as being the only villain in the series not to have been killed off or even brought to justice for the crimes he committed. From a real-world point of view, this is part of Hugh Laurie's continuous set of appearances in Blackadder, but the last of those in which he is only credited as a guest actor, Laurie having made his debut appearance in the previous Blackadder II episode, "Beer" as Simon Partridge or "Farters Parters" and "Mr. Ostrich", a drunk. He remains one of two actors in the Blackadder series to have played two completely different characters in the same series, Blackadder II (the other being Rowan Atkinson himself, who played Mr. E. Blackadder and his Scottish cousin MacAdder in the Blackadder the Third series finale episode, "Duel and Duality"). Laurie was the first to do so, with Atkinson second. Laurie would later join the main cast for Blackadder the Third and Blackadder Goes Forth; possibly, they all share a common ancestor. (Lt. George had a German uncle, so this is not out of the question.)

=== Mrs Miggins ===
Mrs Miggins (Helen Atkinson-Wood) plays a supporting role in Blackadder the Third. In Blackadder II, Mrs Miggins is referred to as a pie shop owner, but never appears. In the third series, Mrs Miggins plays a major role and appears in all episodes. She now owns a coffee shop that Blackadder visits regularly. In the final episode, she runs off with Blackadder's Scottish cousin, MacAdder. Mrs Miggins is also briefly referenced in the final episode of Blackadder Goes Forth, when George suggests they could pass the time by singing along to "music hall hits", one of them being "Whoops Mrs Miggins, you're sitting on my artichokes!"

== Minor characters ==
- Lord Angus (Valentine Dyall) – ("Witchsmeller Pursuivant")
- Anon (Mark Arden) – a guard at the Royal Palace, along with Soft. ("Witchsmeller Pursuivant", "The Black Seal")
- Tally Applebottom (Jane Freeman) – a peasant with an apparent inability to stop laughing madly, she very nearly committed bigamy with Prince Edmund. ("The Queen of Spain's Beard")
- Thomas Applebottom (Howard Lew Lewis) – Tally Applebottom's husband. He was not happy that Prince Edmund was attempting to marry his wife. He also appears in the prologue of "Witchsmeller Pursuivant" in which he dies of the Black Death. ("The Queen of Spain's Beard", "Witchsmeller Pursuivant")
- Tom the Balladeer (Tony Aitken) – a minstrel who sings songs about the continued failures of Lord Edmund Blackadder (Elizabethan). Other than a brief scene in "Money", the minstrel appeared only in the closing credits of each episode of Blackadder II, in the first episodes he annoys Blackadder, and gets hunted in the later episodes. In one episode, the minstrel appeared before Blackadder (coincidentally, the same one in which he had a brief appearance). In the last episode, Blackadder caught the minstrel and possibly drowned him. (Blackadder II)
- Beadle and the Enormous Orphans – Beadle, an orphan master (Denis Lill) and his enormous orphans (David Barber, Erkan Mustafa and David Nunn) appear in the Christmas special Blackadder's Christmas Carol. Despite claiming to be poor, all three of the orphans are actually morbidly obese. They are, in fact, so fat that they must push and shove each other in order to all fit into a room, with Blackadder remarking that he is always afraid of "bursting one of them and getting showered in two dozen semi-digested pies."
- Friar Bellows (Paul Brooke) – a member of The Black Seal and the clergy, Friar Bellows' godliness was somewhat less than complete given his fondness for fornication and murder. ("The Black Seal")
- Ivor "Jest Ye Not Madam" Biggun (Geoffrey McGivern) – a politician who participated in the Dunny-on-the-Wold by-election in "Dish and Dishonesty", standing for the Standing at the Back Dressed Stupidly and Looking Stupid Party (an early frivolous party and a parody of the Official Monster Raving Loony Party). Biggun loses the election to Baldrick, but, unlike the others, takes his defeat jovially, saying that: "if you can't laugh, what can you do?". His party's policies included: "the compulsory serving of asparagus at breakfast, free corsets for the under-fives, and the abolition of slavery", the last of which was apparently added "for a joke".
- The baby-eating Bishop of Bath and Wells (Ronald Lacey) is an enforcer for a loan-sharking operation, The Bank of the Black Monks, in the second-series episode "Money". Blackadder owes him and the bank £1,000, and when Blackadder cannot afford to pay, the bishop threatens to shove a hot poker into his rectum. Blackadder drugs the bishop and blackmails him by having the bishop sketched in bed with Lord Percy.
- Philip of Burgundy aka "The Hawk/Thrush" (Patrick Allen) – The deadly childhood rival of Prince Edmund, he was known to his enemies as "The Hawk" (or, when a child, "The Thrush"). Philip managed to wrest control of The Black Seal away from Edmund, leading to Edmund's hideously violent but amusing death on a bizarre torture device, the "amusing" part coming from the feathers used to tickle Edmund under "what's left of [his] arms". Philip was poisoned by Baldrick and Percy along with the members of The Black Seal. ("The Black Seal")
- Sir Talbot Buxomly MP (Denis Lill) – Member of Parliament for the village of Dunny-on-the-Wold in Suffolk, who was recruited by Mr. E. Blackadder and the Prince Regent in the Blackadder the Third episode "Dish and Dishonesty" to prevent the Prince Regent from being removed from the Civil List in the House of Commons, but soon died as he sat on a chair while meeting the Prince, and left his seat open for a by-election in Dunny-on-the-Wold.
- Cain & Abel (Bert Parnaby & Roy Evans) – A pair of peasants with a great admiration for a faceful of manure. ("The Archbishop", "Witchsmeller Pursuivant", "The Black Seal")
- Lord Chiswick (Stephen Tate) – a courtier to King Richard IV of England. His most significant function appeared to be keeping the King supplied with fresh horses, although he did occasionally curb his master's fiery temper.
- Cordelia (Gretchen Franklin) – one of a triad of three haggard witches. Named Goneril, Regan and Cordelia after King Lear's daughters, they foretell that Edmund shall become king, despite him referring to them as "hideous crones", "loathsome drabs" and "snaggle-toothed vultures". It is only after he leaves that they realise they have mixed him up with Henry Tudor. They appear to make this mistake frequently. The witches appeared in the episode, "The Foretelling".
- Sir Justin de Boinod (Bill Wallis) – an English knight of Norman descent freshly returned from the Crusades, he and his drunken colleague Sir George de Boeuf attempted to murder Edmund Plantagenet, Archbishop of Canterbury after misunderstanding the King. However, they failed to fully replicate the murder of Thomas Becket and Edmund was merely excommunicated. ("The Archbishop")
- Sir George de Boeuf (David Delve) – one of the two knights involved in the failed assassination of Prince Edmund during his tenure as Archbishop of Canterbury. ("The Archbishop")
- Maria Escalosa, Infanta of Spain (Miriam Margolyes) – Infanta of Spain, Maria Escalosa was briefly engaged to Prince Edmund following an arranged marriage by the King for his own political gains. Expecting a ravishing Royal princess, Edmund was rather disappointed to discover she did not quite accord with his mental picture, being short and fat.
- Nurse Mary Fletcher-Brown (Miranda Richardson) – appears in the Blackadder Goes Forth episode "General Hospital". Like Amy Hardwood in Blackadder the Third, she has a "fluffy bunny act", (her bedside manner), but is really a highly intelligent cynic. Though Prince George was originally disgusted by Amy's stupid act, his descendant Lieutenant George thinks Nurse Mary is "an absolute peach," and appears to be regressing to the nursery under her care. She had a brief fling with Captain Blackadder, but this time it was he who was leading her on, suspecting her of being a German spy and eventually exposing her (calling her "Nurse Fleischer-Baum") with three few-supposed facts. She was sent to be executed by firing squad, but Blackadder learns that the real source of information being leaked to the Germans was an unwitting Lieutenant George (because of inter-familial relationships between British and German aristocrats).
- Le Comte de Frou Frou (Tim McInnerny) – an apparently foppish, disgruntled, homesick French aristocrat in Blackadder the Third. The character was forced to flee his home country for England, in order to escape the French Revolution. He was later revealed to be a disguise adopted by Prince George's friend Lord Topper, alias one half of the Scarlet Pimpernel.
- Mad Gerald (Rik Mayall) – a one-time cellmate of Prince Edmund whilst the latter was waiting to be eaten alive by snails, he had two friends: Mr Rat and Mr Key, which Gerald made from his own teeth ("The Black Seal"). Actor Rik Mayall later returned as Lord Flashheart in Blackadder II's "Bells", as Squadron Commander The Lord Flashheart in Blackadder Goes Forth's "Private Plane" and as Robin Hood in Blackadder: Back & Forth.
- Goneril (Kathleen St John) – one of a triad of three haggard witches, modelled on the witches from Macbeth. Named Goneril, Regan and Cordelia after King Lear's daughters, they foretell that Edmund shall become king, despite him referring to them as "hideous crones", "loathsome drabs" and "snaggle-toothed vultures". It is only after he leaves that they realise they have mixed him up with Henry Tudor (i.e. the genuine Macbeth). They appear to make this mistake frequently. The witches appeared in the episode, "The Foretelling".
- Field Marshal Sir Douglas Haig (Geoffrey Palmer) – A caricature of the historic Douglas Haig. The hard-nosed leader of the British Army during the First World War, Haig is portrayed as an old comrade of Captain Blackadder whom Blackadder saved from a "pygmy woman with the sharpened mango" at the Battle of Mboto Gorge during a Victorian colonial war. He is portrayed as having a similar disregard for his men's lives as General Melchett, and his best advice for Blackadder to escape the final push was to stick two pencils up his nose and his underpants on his head so that he would be classed as insane and sent home, a plan which Blackadder had already tried - "The phrase rhymes with clucking bell.".
- Amy Hardwood (Miranda Richardson) – chosen by Mr. E. Blackadder Esq. to be the bride of his master, the Prince Regent, due to his belief that her father, a bad-tempered northern industrialist, was extremely rich. However, upon the discovery that Mr. Hardwood wished his daughter to marry the prince for his money, Blackadder called it off, realising the Hardwoods were impoverished. She is later revealed as a highwayman, the Shadow.
- Samuel Johnson (Robbie Coltrane) - A caricature of the historic Samuel Johnson. In season III, episode 2, "Ink and Incapability", Dr Johnson is offering his Dictionary of the English Language for patronage by the Prince of Wales. Johnson is portrayed as comically verbose and quick to anger after spending ten years writing his dictionary. With the Prince being utterly disinterested and Blackadder preying on Johnson's vanity, the latter storms out of the premises, leaving the manuscript behind, to be accidentally destroyed by Baldrick.
- Keanrick and Mossop (Hugh Paddick and Kenneth Connor) – two actors who run a local theatre that Prince George frequents. Despite their flamboyant, over the top and unconvincing style of acting, George loves their performances, although he can never understand that they are not real. His butler, Mr. E. Blackadder Esq., is not as interested in their performances.
- Kate's Father (Edward Jewesbury) – the father of "Bob", or rather Kate. As he had grown too old to support himself and his daughter, he was in favour of the idea of Kate becoming a prostitute. Instead, she decided to go to London, disguise herself as a boy, and seek her fortune. ("Bells")
- Jack Large (Big Mick) – also known as Unspeakably Violent Jack, the Bull-Buggering, Priest-Killer of No Fixed Abode, his fearsome reputation was somewhat undermined by his being somewhat less than five-foot tall. Jack was a member of The Black Seal and died after being poisoned by Baldrick and Percy. ("The Black Seal")
- Princess Leia of Hungary (Natasha King) – In 1492, at the age of eight, she married the show's central character, Prince Edmund, although she was originally betrothed to his brother, Prince Harry. A last-minute complication had changed matters, and Edmund was married to Leia instead of his original fiancée, Maria Escalosa, the Spanish Infanta (played by Miriam Margolyes). Three years later, Leia seemed uncomprehending or unconcerned at the prospect of her husband being burned as a witch.
- Reverend Lloyd (John Rapley) – The priest who nearly bigamously married Prince Edmund to Tally Applebottom via rather violent persuasion by Baldrick. Tally Applebottom's husband Thomas made a well-timed interruption of the ceremony, accompanied by a large scythe. ("The Queen of Spain's Beard")
- MacAdder (Rowan Atkinson) – The nearly identical — though red-haired — Scottish cousin of Mr. E. Blackadder Esq. He is known as being the "most dangerous man ever to wear a skirt in Europe". He believes he is rightful king of England and plans to incite rebellion, meaning his cousin is very frustrated with him. He is apparently a skilled swordsman, but also a kipper salesman and married to a woman named Morag back in Scotland though he initiates in an affair with Mrs. Miggins. He had two children; a boy named Jamie, and girl named Angus (instead of Agnes). Mr. Edmund Blackadder Esq. wants him to take his place in the duel with the Iron Duke of Wellington to which MacAdder replies: "Why don't I take the place of the Duke of Wellington and kill the prince?" Edmund Blackadder tells MacAdder that if he does this he will incur the wrath of the bailiffs. MacAdder thereby declines and leaves for Scotland with Miggins, foiling Blackadder's plan.
- Dougal MacAngus, 4th Duke of Argyll (Alex Norton) – The character appears in the episode "Born to Be King". He is Supreme Commander of the King's Army and the Fourth Duke of Argyll. Upon his return from a crusade against the Turks, he is rewarded for his bravery with Prince Edmund's Scottish lands. Enraged, Edmund schemes to have him stabbed on stage during the entertainment.
- Messenger (David Nunn) – The character is presented as being clumsy and unintelligent and speaks with a strong estuary English accent. Each time the Messenger appears he enters a room and announces "My Lord, news!". In The Queen of Spain's Beard, he is one of three messengers bearing news about various European nobility, announcing "Lord Wessex is dead!". King Richard's retort, "I like not this news! Bring me some other news!" is based on a line from Shakespeare's Richard III Act 4 Scene 4 in which Richard says, "There, take thou that till thou bring better news," after hearing bad news from a messenger. The Blackadder Messenger is also prone to a kind of compulsive mimicry, mirroring Prince Edmund's movements.
- Millicent (Nicola Bryant) is Blackadder's rich, spoilt-rotten goddaughter in the Christmas special Blackadder's Christmas Carol. She wears a ridiculously large bonnet with a feather and has a piercing cackle of a laugh that forces Blackadder to wear a pair of earmuffs.
- William Pitt the Younger (Simon Osbourne) - A caricature of the historic William Pitt the Younger, the youngest man ever to become British Prime Minister. Pitt the Younger is portrayed in "Dish and Dishonesty" as a priggish and self-righteous teenager who has come to power "right in the middle of my exams". Pitt schemes to bankrupt Prince George while also struggling with puberty. Possibly also a parody of the future Conservative Party leader and Foreign Secretary William Hague, who first made the national news at the age of 16 when he addressed the Conservatives at their 1977 Annual National Conference.
- Master William Pitt the Even Younger was the fictional younger brother of William Pitt the Younger who took part in the Dunny-on-the-Wold by-election in "Dish and Dishonesty", as a representative of the Whigs. Pitt the Even Younger was put up as a candidate against Baldrick by his older brother, Pitt the Younger, but the announcement was welcomed with only sarcasm, and Mr. E. Blackadder Esq. began to ask the name of the candidate, including names such as: Pitt the Toddler, Pitt the Embryo, and Pitt the Glint in the Milkman's Eye, poking fun at Pitt the Younger's adolescence.
- Queen Victoria (Miriam Margolyes) and Prince Albert (Jim Broadbent) are two main characters in the Christmas special Blackadder's Christmas Carol. Victoria, while portrayed as being quite small and fat, with Blackadder remarking that she is "the winner of "the round Britain's shortest, fattest, dumpiest woman" competition," is not portrayed in a similar way to Queenie, being portrayed instead as kind-hearted and pleasant, with her favourite Christmas habit being going out posing as common folk with Albert to determine and reward the virtuous. Albert, meanwhile, is portrayed as somewhat dim-witted, being unable to keep secrets, thus causing him to inadvertently reveal his wife's surprise presents, and having a thick German accent.
- King Richard III of England (Peter Cook) is a fictionalised version of the real Richard III of England. The series' first episode, "The Foretelling", explains that King Richard III was actually a kind, benevolent ruler who doted on his nephews, and that his popular image as a murderous usurper is based on lies spread by his rival, Henry Tudor.
- Captain Redbeard Rum (Tom Baker) – A deranged seafarer who claims to have had his legs "sliced clean off by a falling sail, and swept into the sea before [my] very eyes" and possesses "a beard you could lose a badger in". Rum is the sole captain with, according to Sir Walter Raleigh, few enough marbles to aid Blackadder in his trip around the Cape of Good Hope, and hence captains Blackadder's voyage of discovery – a trip that was intended to be little more than to France and back, but somehow ends up in Australia. Unlike the average seafarer, Rum actually seems to prefer drinking his own urine to water. Percy notes that Rum began doing so before the water ran out.
- Mrs. Scratchit (Pauline Melville) is a woman who appears in Blackadder's Christmas Carol. While seemingly a weak and sweet-natured woman, she is actually a very greedy con artist who has a "crippled" son called Tiny Tom, who is, in fact, morbidly obese (weighing fifteen stone and is "built like a brick privy".) She starts off swindling £17 off Blackadder in return for seventeen matchsticks, claiming it is needed to feed herself and her family, claiming they are too poor to afford any meals, apart from "what Grandfather can scrape from under his big toenail."
- Lord Smedley (Nigel Planer) – An extremely annoying friend of George and one half of the Scarlet Pimpernel, the other half being his friend, Lord Topper. He is killed by a suicide pill given to him by Blackadder when he is disguised as Madame Guillotine in order to rescue him and Baldrick. ("Nob and Nobility")
- Brigadier Sir Bernard Proudfoot Smith (Bill Wallis) – A patient with thick German accent at the hospital in the fourth series episode "General Hospital." Captain Darling thinks he is the German spy, but he is revealed at the end of the episode to be the finest spy in British Army, who picked up "a teensy-veensy bit" of an accent while working long-term undercover in Germany.
- Baron von Richthofen (Ade Edmondson) – A caricature of the historic Manfred von Richthofen, "the Red Baron". A German flying ace who imprisons Blackadder and Baldrick behind enemy lines in the season four episode "Private Plane", Richtofen regards Blackadder and Lord Flashheart as honourable opponents. Blackadder, however, regards his imprisonment as a means of escaping the war, and Lord Flashheart unceremoniously shoots Richtofen midway through a speech. He is also implied to be sexually attracted to Baldrick.
- The Spirit of Christmas (Robbie Coltrane) - A ghost who appears in Blackadder's Christmas Carol, the Spirit of Christmas is a parody of Dickens' Ghost of Christmas Present. He appears to congratulate Ebenezer Blackadder for his kindly and overly-generous ways, but mistakenly converts him to self-serving cynicism after showing him visions of his Tudor and Georgian ancestors and distant descendant.
- Lord Topper (Tim McInnerny) – An extremely irritating friend of Prince George, he is offered the chance to go and rescue a French aristocrat by Blackadder but he refuses. He then disguises himself as Le Comte de Frou Frou and is "rescued" by Blackadder and Baldrick. After being captured by an evil revolutionary (Chris Barrie) and escaping, he reveals himself to be Topper and, coincidentally, one half of the Scarlet Pimpernel, the other half being his friend, Lord Smedley, who had already been killed by a suicide pill given to him by Blackadder. When he is about to tell George the truth about his "rescue", he is also killed the same way as Smedley, Blackadder slipping a suicide pill into his wine. ("Nob and Nobility")
- Nathaniel, Lord Whiteadder (Daniel Thorndike) and Lady Whiteadder (Miriam Margolyes) are Blackadder's Puritanical aunt and uncle in the episode Beer. Blackadder describes them as "the most fanatical Puritans in England" and is pleased to get a message that they are coming to his house to discuss their "whopping great inheritance." Blackadder's meeting with them coincides with a drinking competition Melchett and some friends have challenged him to. He is, therefore, forced to hold the two dinners in separate rooms. Despite his infamous Puritanism, he secretly breaks his vow of silence to thank Blackadder for a fantastic evening (following mishaps involving a phallic turnip, a drunken Edmund and Percy (who he believes to be a jester).)
- The Wise Woman (Barbara Miller) – A "deranged druid" (according to Blackadder) who Baldrick habitually used to cure medical complaints. Out of desperation, Blackadder decided to brave the "swampy wilderness" of Putney and seek her counsel to cure him of his "homosexuality" when he found himself attracted to "Bob". She recommends Blackadder sleep with "him", as that is what she tends to do with people she is attracted to — although she has to drug them first, due to her being "so old and warty". Her subsequent alternative solutions are met with equal disdain; Blackadder vehemently refuses to kill 'Bob', declines the suggestion to kill himself, and treats the solution of killing everybody in the whole world — thus preventing anyone from learning his secret — with disdain. ("Bells")
- The Witchsmeller Pursuivant (Frank Finlay) – During the episode "Witchsmeller Pursuivant", plague breaks out and reports of strange and unexplained phenomena, such as "two women claiming to have been raped by a fish", abound. The council of Lords recommends that "The Witchsmeller Pursuivant" be sent for, in order to track down and eliminate the presumed cause of the ill omens. After Edmund mocks the Witchsmeller by referring to him as "Old Big-nose", the Witchsmeller tricks Edmund into incriminating himself as a witch. During the ensuing trial, Edmund, Percy and Baldrick are found guilty of witchcraft and sentenced to be burned at the stake. However, the Queen provides Edmund with an apparent voodoo-doll of the Witchsmeller, which falls into the fire when Edmund is about to be burned, resulting in the Witchsmeller dying himself and Edmund being apparently cleared.
