= The Black Seal =

- Blackadder episode
- Patrick Allen guest stars as Philip of Burgundy
- Episode no.: Series 1 Episode 6
- Written by: Rowan Atkinson; Richard Curtis
- Original air date: 13 July 1983

Guest appearances
- Patrick Allen; Rik Mayall (uncredited)

Episode chronology
← Previous "Witchsmeller Pursuivant"	Next → "Bells"

"The Black Seal" is the sixth and final episode of The Black Adder, the first serial in the BBC Television Blackadder series. Set in late 15th-century England, the episode concludes the alternate history of the last years of the House of York with the final adventure of Prince Edmund, Duke of Edinburgh, son of the fictional King Richard IV. The story follows a conspiracy by Edmund to overthrow the King and seize the throne of England for himself, assisted by a band of violent mercenaries.

This episode features a number of guest stars, including Patrick Allen (who also provided the voiceover introducing each episode in this series) and The Young Ones actors Rik Mayall and Roger Sloman.

== Plot ==
On Saint Juniper's Day, 29 January 1498, King Richard IV snubs Prince Edmund, taking away his Duchy and leaving him with the sole dignity of Warden of the Royal Privies, while awarding his brother Harry with several important titles. Finally reaching his breaking point, Edmund declares that he will take over the kingdom. He fires Percy and Baldrick and begins his quest for glory, aided to his chagrin by a retired Morris dancer.

Edmund sets forth across the English countryside in search of the six other ‘most evil men in the kingdom’:

- Sir Wilfred Death (John Hallam), a skilled duellist.
- Three-Fingered Pete (Roger Sloman), an archer who only has three fingers on his right hand
- Guy de Glastonbury (Patrick Malahide), a highwayman who kills his victims after taking their money.
- Sean the Irish Bastard (Ron Cook), a thief who preys on beggars.
- Friar Bellows (Paul Brooke), who uses his position to deflower peasant girls.
- Jack Large (Big Mick), a dwarf, whom Sir Wilfred describes as "Unspeakably Violent Jack, the bull-buggering priest-killer of no fixed abode".

Edmund plans to ride home and then to summon them all by sending a black-haired messenger. They are to gather in the tavern of the recently deceased old Jasper (slain by Friar Bellows), before heading out to seize the royal courts and thus the kingdom. Edmund suggests they exile the Royal Family for life; however, the rest of the band are surprised, and Glastonbury says they should kill them, to which Edmund reluctantly agrees.

After his comrades disperse, Edmund's plan hits a severe setback. The Morris Dancer casts off his disguise to reveal himself as Edmund's childhood rival, Philip of Burgundy, nicknamed ‘The Hawk’ (Patrick Allen). Philip has just arrived in England after 15 years of exile in France, an exile for which Edmund was apparently responsible. As revenge, Philip locks Edmund in a prison cell to be devoured by snails, which he says will take 15 years to happen. There is another inmate in the cell, Mad Gerald (Rik Mayall), who has been incarcerated for 20 years and whose best friend is a rat. After 12 months of rambling insanely to a bored Edmund, in late December, Gerald shows the Prince a key he had made from his own teeth. Edmund seizes the key, successfully opens the cell door and escapes. Despite now having the opportunity to escape himself, Gerald opts not to, incensed that Edmund did not close the door behind him.

The first person Edmund meets after escaping from prison is a man seeking to sell five black homing pigeons and one black homing chicken. While the seller's initial asking price is six shillings, he generously invites Edmund to beat him up, gag him, tie him to a tree and steal the pigeons, an offer the Prince gratefully accepts. Edmund promptly sends the pigeons to fly to his fellow conspirators. However, Philip of Burgundy beats the gang to the royal castle, and, when they arrive, promptly persuades them to abandon Edmund and adopt him as their leader, after Edmund talks of Philip's bad attributes. Edmund's protestations that Philip is a twisted, ruthless killer who murdered his own family only increases Philip's standing in their eyes. Philip then forces Edmund into a torture chair, in which he is horribly mutilated (his ears and hands are chopped off, his skull is cracked, a spike rams up into his anus, and he is castrated). Just then, Percy and Baldrick, disguised as serving wenches, serve the conspirators poisoned wine, killing them. Sean survives, but takes another drink saying ‘It's got a little bit of sting in its tail’, and dies.

As a bandaged Edmund lies on his deathbed with the entire court mourning over him, his father wakes him up by loudly shouting ‘EDMUND!’ Edmund, surprised that his father had, for the first time, got his name right, mutters ‘Father, you called me Edmund.’ Richard answers ‘Sorry, Edgar’ (even though everyone else present was calling him Edmund) and proposes a toast for his son. Asked by Edmund to call him by his nom de guerre, Richard calls a further toast, to ‘The Black Dagger’ and his remembrance by posterity. As Percy had unwittingly poisoned the entire batch of wine instead of only the Black Seal's goblets as Baldrick asked of him, the entire royal court dies after drinking the wine. Edmund correctly deduces that the wine was what killed them, but foolishly decides to take a sip to check. Believing the wine is not the killer, as he has not immediately died, he declares himself King of England (thus fulfilling the prophecy of the witches from "The Foretelling"), only for the wine to kill him moments later.

After the credits, Percy and Baldrick run in to stop the court drinking the wine, only to find they are too late.

== Cast ==
The closing credits of this episode list the cast members "in order of disappearance".

- John Carlisle as Murdered Lord
- Bert Parnaby as Cain, a Blind Beggar
- Roy Evans as Abel, a Blind Beggar
- Forbes Collins as the Trusting Father
- Des Webb as the Person of Unrestricted Growth
- John Barrard as the Retired Morris Dancer
- Rik Mayall as Mad Gerald (credited as himself)
- Perry Benson as the Pigeon Vendor
- Paul Brooke as Friar Bellows
- Big Mick as Jack Large
- Roger Sloman as Three Fingered Pete
- Patrick Malahide as Guy of Glastonbury
- John Hallam as Sir Wilfred Death
- Patrick Allen as The Hawk
- Ron Cook as Sean, The Irish Bastard
- Robert East as Harry, Prince of Wales
- Elspet Gray as The Queen
- Brian Blessed as King Richard IV
- Rowan Atkinson as The Flat Adder (he lost his duchy early on in the episode)
- Tony Robinson as Baldrick
- Tim McInnerny as Percy the Poisoner
- Gareth Milne as Stuntman

== Production ==
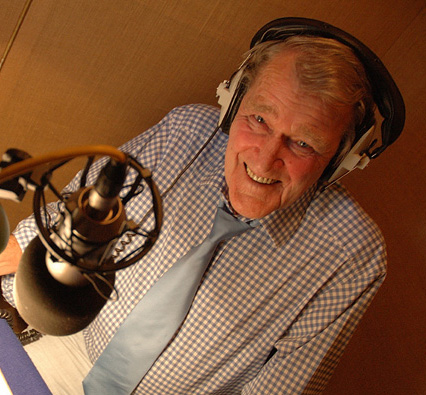
Voiceover artist and actor Patrick Allen, who narrated the entire series, portrayed Philip of Burgundy, the episode's main antagonist

Guest actors featured in each of the episodes of The Black Adder to lend both a sense of theatrical gravitas and comedic interpretation. For the final episode, well-known comedy actors were cast to play supporting roles. Rik Mayall, who had established himself in the 1982 comedy series The Young Ones, appeared as Mad Gerald. At his own request, Mayall was not credited in the cast list (Mad Gerald was billed as ‘Himself’); as with his appearances as Kevin Turvey in A Kick Up the Eighties (1982), Mayall liked to experiment at this time with a form of performance which blurred the boundaries between fact and fiction, and encouraged the audience to believe the action was really happening. His appearance marked his first collaboration with Rowan Atkinson, and it was noted that their work together took on a competitive edge; Mayall would dominate the set and preferred to rewrite his own lines. The competitiveness continued into their next appearance together in Black Adder II, when Mayall played the role of the overbearing womaniser, Lord Flashheart.

Patrick Allen was cast in the role of Edmund's nemesis, Philip of Burgundy. Allen was an established actor, but it was his prolific voiceover roles in a range of films that had associated his voice with grand, swashbuckling productions, from the 1956 anthology series The Errol Flynn Theatre to (Carry On) Don't Lose Your Head and Carry On... Up the Khyber, two noted British historical comedy movies. By casting Allen, Atkinson sought to create an association with these popular films. In an earlier version of "The Black Seal", Allen was to play a greater role, disguising himself as a messenger who was to bear tidings of Edmund's accidental beheading in a bear trap; the story was to end with Baldrick remarking that they had fallen victim to "someone else's cunning plan".

This episode concludes the alternate history of King Richard IV which was set in motion in Episode I, "The Foretelling", and which diverges from the established history of Henry VII, who reigned as King of England from 1485 to 1509. No mention of Richard's successor is made in Episode 6, but within The Black Adder narrative, it must be assumed that the accidental poisoning of the entire royal court created the opportunity for Henry Tudor to seize power.

As with previous episodes of The Black Adder, the end credits of "The Black Seal" include an acknowledgement of "additional dialogue by William Shakespeare". In this episode, overt Shakespearian reference is limited to Edmund's rousing address to his gang of mercenaries, in which he declares ‘We few, we happy few, we band of ruthless bastards!’ – words adapted from Henry V's St Crispin's Day Speech before the Battle of Agincourt (Henry V, Act 4, Scene III).

== Critical assessment ==
The Black Adder series has been noted for blurring the boundaries between traditional situation comedy and historical drama. This was partly achieved through careful casting (described above) but also through references to classic cinema productions; in "The Black Seal", Prince Edmund's quest to find the six most evil men in the land (with Edmund as the seventh) is seen as a deliberate nod to (and satire on) the films Seven Samurai (1954) and its Western remake The Magnificent Seven (1960). It was also Rowan Atkinson's stated aim to draw inspiration from Errol Flynn's 1938 film The Adventures of Robin Hood, and there are clear parallels between Prince Edmund's band of outlaws and Robin Hood's Merry Men (both of which include an overweight friar character). The presence of Rik Mayall in the episode (albeit uncredited) is one of a number of cameos by established performers on the flourishing alternative comedy circuit of the 1980s, and links Blackadder series with more subversive comedy styles being developed at this time.
