= Witchsmeller Pursuivant =

- Blackadder episode
- Frank Finlay as the Witchsmeller Pursuivant.
- Episode no.: Series 1 Episode 5
- Written by: Rowan Atkinson; Richard Curtis
- Original air date: 13 July 1983

Guest appearances
- Frank Finlay; Valentine Dyall

Episode chronology
← Previous "The Queen of Spain's Beard"	Next → "The Black Seal"

"Witchsmeller Pursuivant" is the fifth episode of the first series of the BBC sitcom Blackadder (The Black Adder). It is set in England in the late 15th century and centres on the fictitious Prince Edmund, who finds himself falsely accused of witchcraft by a travelling witch-hunter known as the Witchsmeller Pursuivant. The story satirises mediaeval superstition and religious belief.

Academy Award-nominated actor Frank Finlay guest stars in this episode as the Witchsmeller, and Valentine Dyall appears in a cameo.

== Plot ==
In 1495, Europe is being ravaged by the Black Death, with England being no exception. Even King Richard IV has fallen ill with it, rendering him even more deranged and violent than usual; Prince Edmund goes to visit him and is nearly run through by the plague-addled king, who hallucinates him as a Turk. With the king unable to rule, Harry, Prince of Wales summons the privy council to manage the crisis. The noblemen exchange tales of evil omens from around the kingdom, and before long mass-hysteria sets in and they declare that the realm is in the grip of witchcraft. Ignoring Prince Edmund's objections, they resolve to summon the Witchsmeller Pursuivant. Prince Edmund, accompanied by Percy and Baldrick, goes to find out more about the Witchsmeller from the local village, but discovers the remains of a woman who has already been burned at the stake for witchcraft, along with her cat. Unbeknown to Edmund, the Witchsmeller lurks among the villagers, watching him as he boasts about his plans to give the Witchsmeller "a boot up the backside."

Returning to the castle, Edmund is confronted by the Witchsmeller, who invites Edmund to undergo a test to determine if he is a witch. Edmund agrees, but the test is rigged and he is accused of witchcraft.

Prince Edmund stands trial; Percy and Baldrick are appointed defence lawyers, but the Witchsmeller silences them before they can even start their case by condemning them also as witches. The proceedings rapidly descend into a farcical show trial. The Witchsmeller interrogates Edmund and presents three pieces of evidence in his case: Prince Edmund, who he dubs "The Great Grumbledook", has a pet cat named Bubbles (which the Witchsmeller says is "short for Beelzebubbles") who supposedly drinks blood (with Edmund having been goaded into saying that it drank "bloody milk" after asked the same question repeatedly); he has allegedly engaged in acts of bestiality with his horse, Black Satin, who supposedly has the ability to talk (the horse later dies during interrogation, but leaves a signed "confession"); and he is accused of having sexual relations with an elderly peasant woman who claims to have then given birth to a poodle. Despite their protests, Edmund, Percy and Baldrick are found guilty and sentenced to burning at the stake. Although the trio manage to somehow escape the courtroom (via a plan devised by Baldrick which is not revealed onscreen), they unwittingly enter King Richard's chambers, and the three end up having to be rescued from the delusional king by the guards. Edmund is visited by his mother, the Queen, and his child wife, Princess Leia of Hungary. To Edmund's dismay, they offer no escape plan but instead present him with a small doll for comfort.

On the day of the execution, Edmund and his companions have their heads shaved and are tied to stakes. Edmund rebukes Baldrick's last-minute "cunning plan" and offers a feeble confession before the Witchsmeller in a bid to stall the proceedings. When the pyre is lit, Edmund panics and drops the doll – a small, hooded effigy which bears a striking resemblance to the Witchsmeller. As the doll burns, the Witchsmeller suddenly catches fire and is incinerated, revealing it to be a voodoo-doll. The pyre is mysteriously extinguished and the ropes tying the condemned men break away, freeing them.

In the castle, King Richard emerges from his bed-chamber, freshly recuperated from the bubonic plague. Princess Leia begins to tell him about the execution but Queen Gertrude silences her and assures him that all is well. Breaking the fourth wall, the Queen looks at the viewer and winks as magical sparkles fly from her eyes and twitches her nose in a pastiche of Bewitched. Leia quietly gasps in amazement as she realises that the Queen is the (implied) real witch.

== Cast ==
The closing credits of this episode list the cast members "in order of witchiness".

- Rowan Atkinson – The Great Grumbledook
- Frank Finlay – The Witchsmeller Pursuivant
- Elspet Gray – The Witch Queen
- Tim McInnerny – Percy, A Witch
- Tony Robinson – Baldrick, a Witch
- Richard Murdoch – Ross, A Lord
- Valentine Dyall – Angus, A Lord
- Peter Schofield – Fife, A Lord
- Stephen Frost – Soft, A Guard
- Mark Arden – Anon, A Guard
- Perry Benson – Daft Red, A Peasant
- Bert Parnaby – Dim Cain, A Peasant
- Roy Evans – Dumb Abel, A Peasant
- Forbes Collins – Dopey Jack, A Peasant
- Patrick Duncan – Officer, An Officer
- Barbara Miller – Jane Firkettle
- Natasha King – Princess Leia
- Howard Lew Lewis – Piers, A Yeoman
- Sarah Thomas – Mrs. Field, A Goodwife
- Louise Gold – Mrs. Tyler, A Goodwife
- Brian Blessed – Richard IV, A King
- Gareth Milne – Stuntman

=== Uncredited ===
- Patrick Allen – Narrator (voice)
- Robert East – Harry, Prince of Wales
- Salo Gardner – Devil

== Production ==
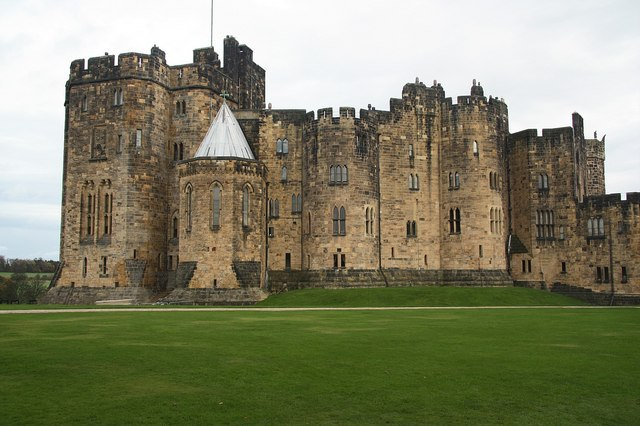
Alnwick Castle, the location for King Richard's castle.

This episode features a number of scenes filmed on location at Alnwick Castle in Northumberland, the setting for King Richard's castle throughout this series. Due to limitations on budget, only selected actors were filmed on location, including Frank Finlay, who filmed scenes there as the Witchsmeller. A production assistant on the series, Hilary Bevan-Jones, recalls that she forgot to pick up Finlay from the location at the end of a shoot and left him behind, until the make-up team found him wandering in the snow in full Witchsmeller costume and brought him back to the hotel.

Despite budgetary limitations, producer John Lloyd's account of this episode was that "it felt more like a huge feature film than a BBC comedy" on account of the construction of a large set for the village scene and the extravagant use of costume, make-up, animals and pyrotechnic stunts.

Actor Tony Robinson singles out "Witchsmeller Pursuivant" as the episode in which Baldrick's catchphrase, "I have a cunning plan", was firmly developed. The phrase had featured in previous episodes – it had been used in the pilot episode, and in Episode 2, "Born to be King", Prince Edmund and Baldrick develop it whilst plotting against Dougal McAngus. Robinson recalls that during the filming of episode 5, he realised that re-using the word "cunning" could be an effective comedic device and he inserted it into his line "I have a plan" as Baldrick conspires with Edmund to escape from the dungeon.

Although the credits give recognition to William Shakespeare, unlike previous episodes in this series, the script of "Witchsmeller Pursuivant" does not contain any direct references to Shakespeare's plays. The title is a parody of the Vincent Price film, Witchfinder General; a pursuivant (lit. 'follower') is a junior officer of arms (person in charge of heraldry, ceremony and genealogy).
