= The Black Adder (Blackadder) =

- Blackadder episode
- Title screen of the pilot episode.
- Directed by: Geoff Posner
- Written by: Richard Curtis; Rowan Atkinson
- Running time: 32 minutes

Episode chronology
← Previous —	Next → "The Foretelling"

"The Black Adder" is the pilot episode of the BBC television series Blackadder. Taped on 20 June 1982, it features the original incarnation of the character Edmund Blackadder, played by Rowan Atkinson. Following this pilot, The Black Adder eventually went into production and the first six-part series was broadcast in 1983, but with a number of changes to the casting, characterisation and plot; while the transmitted series was set in 1485 and the years following the Battle of Bosworth Field, this untransmitted pilot was set in 16th century, apparently during the Elizabethan Era.

A close adaptation of the script of the pilot episode was used for the second episode of the first series, "Born to Be King", which contains many similar characters, situations and lines to the pilot.

The pilot episode was broadcast for the first time on UKTV's Gold channel, on 15 June 2023 to celebrate the fortieth anniversary of the show.

== Production ==
Like the first series, The Black Adder, it was written by Richard Curtis and Rowan Atkinson. However, the episode features a number of major differences to the aired first series.

=== Historical setting and characters ===
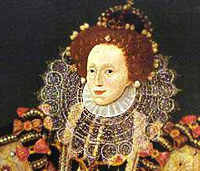
Elspet Gray's costume as the Queen (left) resembles Elizabeth I (right) but the character is not explicitly named in the script.

The pilot episode is introduced with on-screen scrolling text which announces that the setting is "Europe, 400 years ago" which, based on the date of production, places the episode during the reign of Queen Elizabeth I. In this respect, and in the design of the sets and costumes, the pilot bears much resemblance to the second series, Blackadder II (1986), which is also set during the Elizabethan era. However, the historical connections are vague in the pilot episode; while the costume, jewellery and hairstyle of the Queen bear a strong resemblance to that of Elizabeth I, the reigning monarchs are cast anonymously as "the Queen" and "the King" and no reference is made to their actual identities. Even if the character of the Queen is intended to be Elizabeth I, the King and their two sons, Princes Henry and Edmund, would be entirely fictitious characters, as Elizabeth I neither married nor bore offspring. (It is also worth noting that the episode states that Prince Harry was born in 1526 – seven years before the real Elizabeth I – which would imply the episode is set in around 1550 and that the line "400 years ago" is only very approximate.)

In the version of The Black Adder which was eventually televised in 1983, the setting is shifted back some 100 years to 1485, and the King is clearly identified as King Richard IV, a fictional successor to Richard III who rules England with his Queen, the fictional Gertrude of Flanders, during a rewritten period of history. The character of Queen Elizabeth I was later revisited in Blackadder II, when Miranda Richardson played the role of Queenie, a skittish caricature of the Virgin Queen.

=== Cast ===
Another major difference to the first series is the cast – most notably, comic actor Philip Fox plays the character Baldrick, rather than Tony Robinson, who was to play the role in all subsequent series. John Savident plays the role of the King, who was replaced by Brian Blessed for the first series. Prince Harry is played by Robert Bathurst instead of Robert East. The rest of the cast (Atkinson, Tim McInnerny as Percy and Elspet Gray as the Queen) were reunited for the commissioned series.

=== Production team ===
The pilot was directed by Geoff Posner, who was the director of the last series of Not the Nine O'Clock News. The producer was the then head of comedy department, John Howard Davies; but this was a temporary measure because John Lloyd, who had co-produced Not The Nine O'Clock News, was working on a special with Pamela Stephenson. When the series was commissioned, Lloyd took over the producer's role. A unique instrumental version of the "Blackadder" theme by Howard Goodall was used, performed by an orchestra and harpsichord. A revised arrangement, featuring mock-heroic lyrics, was used for the first series.

== Plot ==
The episode opens with a rendition of the now-familiar Blackadder theme, followed by an on-screen narrative text:

It is Europe, 400 years ago. In Spain, war rages, as Christians from every land fight off the threatening terror of Turkish invasion. The French... are in uneasy peace. But in England, under the tutelage of a powerful king, the Ship of State ploughs a steady course, as the court awaits the Queen's birthday and the return of a Scottish hero from the war...

The action opens with Prince Harry, the King, and the Queen discussing the war with the Spanish. They hope it will soon be over so they can fight the French. The Queen is in high spirits, as it is her birthday and she has been given the county of Shropshire as a present.

Prince Edmund, Duke of York is in his chambers with his servants Percy and Baldrick. He is clearly unhappy about the task he has been given, which is to arrange the festivities for both the Queen's birthday and the return of the Scottish hero Dougal McAngus to the court. He refers to his brother Henry as "the bastard". Baldrick points out that if Henry actually was a bastard, Edmund would one day be King. When he finds out that the eunuchs scheduled to appear have cancelled, Edmund decides to have them executed. ("This is a Royal command performance – there are only two options. Either you do it, or you don't do it. If you do it, you don't get paid. If you don't do it, you get beheaded.")

Later, at a presentation in the great hall, the King gives McAngus all Edmund's lands in Scotland. Edmund is furious, and he, Percy and Baldrick plot to kill McAngus. Percy warns that the King will disinherit Edmund if he thinks he has deliberately killed McAngus, so they agree to make it look like an accident. Baldrick suggests putting McAngus's head in the mouth of a cannon and firing it, but Edmund dismisses this as feeble.

Looking for the Scot, Edmund overhears him telling the Queen that his father sends her his regards. Edmund invites McAngus to act as the Scotsman in the play "The Death of the Scotsman", to be performed for the Queen's birthday.

Later, as Edmund is about to start the play, he discovers that McAngus is drunk. Percy and Baldrick begin the play, and are later joined by Edmund and McAngus. In the play, McAngus insults the Queen, then stabs Edmund with a fake telescopic sword. He is sentenced to be hanged from the gallows. Leaving the stage, Edmund instructs Percy and Baldrick to remove the safety hook from the gallows, and warns them that whatever happens, if the Scotsman lives, they will die.

Off-stage, McAngus tells Edmund about hidden love letters from the Queen to McAngus' father, casting doubts on the lineage of Prince Henry. McAngus is back on stage about to be hanged, before Edmund realises he needs him alive to show him the letters. He tries to stop the hanging from off-stage by cutting the noose with a spear, but it fails, so in a last-ditch attempt, he throws a sheet over his head, and enters the stage as the ghost of the Prince. He pleads mercy for the Scotsman, but Percy and Baldrick, mindful of his previous threat, are determined to carry out the execution. A comic fight sequence ensues, which ends with Edmund inadvertently hanging McAngus himself, but then holding him up to stop him choking.

A gleeful Edmund is shown the love letters that his mother wrote. He instructs Baldrick to have the court assembled in the morning, where he reveals the content of the letters which are dated November and December 1526. He begins to falter as he realises that this was nine months after Henry's birth, but nine months before his own; it is he who is illegitimate, not Henry. Edmund tries to pretend that McAngus has forged the letters, and challenges him to a duel to the death. Edmund instructs Baldrick to get the fake telescopic sword for McAngus, but Percy gives Edmund the fake instead. There is a big fight, which culminates in Edmund stabbing McAngus with the fake sword. On finding out that Edmund tried to set him up with the fake sword, McAngus is furious and is about to kill Edmund. When the King begs him for clemency, McAngus agrees, but only if Edmund begs for mercy.

Later, the King, Queen and Henry discuss the letters, which apparently turned out to be French forgeries. Edmund and McAngus are now supposed to be the best of friends. However, up on the tower, McAngus is peering down the barrel of a large cannon, at Edmund's request. Back in the King's chambers, a loud bang is heard. Edmund rushes in to announce that there has been a ‘terrible accident’.

The final shot is of the family coat of arms, inscribed with the motto: Veni Vidi Castratavi Illegitimos ("I came, I saw, I castrated the bastards").

== Cast ==
Character	Pilot	TV series
Edmund, Duke of York	Rowan Atkinson	Rowan Atkinson
King of England	John Savident	Brian Blessed
Queen of England	Elspet Gray	Elspet Gray
Henry, Prince of Wales	Robert Bathurst	Robert East
Percy, Duke of Northumberland	Tim McInnerny	Tim McInnerny
Baldrick, Son of Robin the Dung Gatherer	Philip Fox	Tony Robinson
Dougal McAngus	Alex Norton	Alex Norton
Rudkin	Simon Gipps-Kent	N/A*
Jumping Jesuit**	Oengus MacNamara	Angus Deayton

* The role of Rudkin in the series is replaced by that of Lord Chiswick, played by Stephen Tate. However, Chiswick does not appear in "Born to be King."

**The entertainers were "Jumping Jesuits" in the pilot, "Jumping Jews of Jerusalem" in the series.

== Analysis ==
One of the most notable things about the pilot is Rowan Atkinson's performance as Edmund Blackadder, which is more akin to the character from the second series than the weaselly plotter from the first series. Richard Curtis is said to have thought the character should be more complex for the initial series, than the swaggering lead as seen in the pilot (and future episodes). Due to the limited budget of the episode, it lacks the location filming of the first series, being instead all shot on interior sets, again in a similar fashion to the second series onwards of Blackadder.

In 2010, The Guardian reflected on this, noting that it was "an interesting example of getting it right first time":

The 1982 pilot to Blackadder – or The Black Adder as it was then – is almost exactly what the second series turned out to be. It's set in Elizabethan times, Rowan Atkinson is shrewd and scheming and Baldrick is an idiot. But when the first series came to air, it was set in the Middle Ages, Rowan Atkinson played an idiot and Baldrick was the brains of the operation. It's notable that the show only really started to pick up traction when it reverted to the format of the pilot.

The pilot episode is not available on DVD nor had it, until June 2023, been broadcast on television, although some scenes were featured in the 25th anniversary special Blackadder Rides Again. However, various bootleg copies exist and footage is often seen online. It was shown for the first time on UK television on 15 June 2023 for the 40th Anniversary of the series on Gold.
