= Born to Be King (Blackadder) =

- Blackadder episode
- Dougal MacAngus (Alex Norton) in a Shakespearian-style duel with Prince Edmund (Rowan Atkinson)
- Episode no.: Series 1 Episode 2
- Written by: Rowan Atkinson; Richard Curtis
- Original air date: 22 June 1983

Guest appearances
- Alex Norton - Douglas MacAngus, 4th Duke of Argyll

Episode chronology
← Previous "The Foretelling"	Next → "The Archbishop"

"Born to Be King" is the second episode of The Black Adder, the first series of the BBC sitcom Blackadder. Set in late 15th-century England, the episode humorously examines England's rivalries with the Kingdom of Scotland and centres the dramatic tension on the doubt cast over the parentage of the lead character, Prince Edmund, Duke of Edinburgh.

Although "Born to Be King" was originally broadcast as episode 2 of the series, on later broadcasts and 2009 DVD releases it has been switched with episode 4, "The Queen of Spain's Beard".

== Plot ==
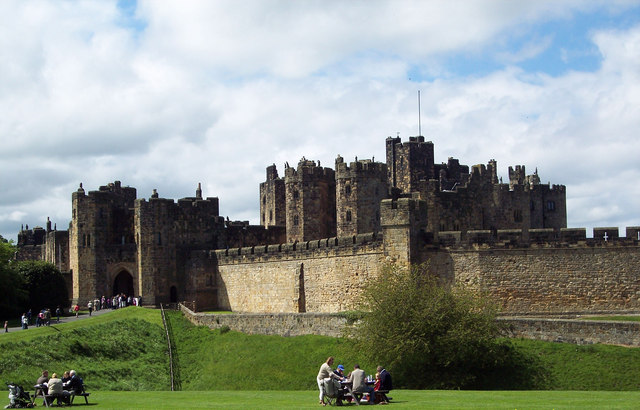
Alnwick Castle, used for location filming as King Richard's castle

The story begins in 1486. The episode opens as King Richard IV departs on a Crusade against the Turks, leaving his elder beloved son Prince Harry to rule as regent. The King's younger son, Prince Edmund, encouraged by his sidekick Baldrick, recognises that Richard's absence affords him an opportunity to take control of the kingdom. As it turns out, Prince Harry takes most of the power and leaves Edmund to do the menial duties that remain: namely herding sheep, straightening the royal portraits and cleaning out the drains.

A year later, Harry plans a feast to celebrate Richard's expected return on St Leonard's Day (6 November) and entrusts Edmund with arranging the entertainments. Edmund grows increasingly frustrated, as the traditional troupe of eunuchs canceled their participation (leading Edmund to furiously sign an execution order) and the bearded lady shaves her beard off at bad timing, leaving Baldrick to take her place (much to his delight). Edmund, Percy and Baldrick have to choose between other acts which the former considers pathetic like Morris dancers, Bernard the bear baiter (who brings in a fake bear from the previous year's event, due to lack of a real one), Jerry Meriwether and His Four Chickens which lays eggs, and a new humorous but boring act entitled "The Jumping Jews of Jerusalem" despite Harry's objections to leaving out three of the main acts everyone else enjoys the most.

King Richard's military commander from Scotland, Dougal MacAngus, arrives for the feast and mistakes Edmund for a eunuch. Edmund's bad mood worsens when MacAngus requests land in Scotland in reward for his service, the Royal burghs of Roxburgh, Selkirk and Peebles. Ignoring the fact that these lands are already possessed by Edmund, Prince Harry grants them to MacAngus, and a furious Edmund plots with Baldrick and Percy to kill MacAngus. After ignoring Baldrick's "cunning plan" to use a cannon, Edmund decides to try something more entertaining. He finds MacAngus hunting in the forest and offers him a part in a play that is being staged at the castle that night as part of the St Leonard's Day festivities. The Death of the Pharaoh is hastily re-scripted as The Death of the Scotsman. Edmund replaces the actors' fake knives with real ones, intending to have them kill MacAngus onstage. When MacAngus reveals he has information that challenges the legitimacy of Prince Harry's claim to the throne in jeopardy, however, Edmund hastily prevents the assassination.

Later, Edmund has the chance to examine the letters himself. They are dated 1460, his brother's year of birth, and Edmund concludes that they prove Harry is an illegitimate and thus placing Edmund first in line to the throne of England. Eagerly, Edmund reveals the letters to the Royal court; his illegitimacy being revealed, Harry renounces the regency. As MacAngus claims that Richard IV was last seen entering Constantinople to face 10,000 Turks alone and armed with only a fruit knife, Edmund has himself announced king: "The King is probably dead, long live the King!" At that moment, however, Richard IV makes a grand but exhausted entrance, stating that he survived "thanks to my trusty fruit knife!".

Edmund is surprised but tries to show the letters to his father. Harry points out that the letters date from November–December 1460, nine months after he was born, and nine months before Edmund was born, thus suggesting that Edmund is a bastard. Suddenly faced with losing his royal title, Edmund is quick to claim the letters are forgeries and burns them out of feigned disgust. In the heat of the moment, Edmund also challenges MacAngus to a duel; MacAngus quickly disarms him with a single blow of the sword, and while MacAngus holds the sword to his neck, Edmund begs for his life, offering everything he had to MacAngus. MacAngus pretends at first to be about to strike but then laughs, showing no hard feelings. Soon afterwards, Harry sees Edmund and MacAngus keeping company, and believes them to have become firm friends. However, it is shown that Edmund goes through with Baldrick's plan and MacAngus dies in an "accident" involving a cannon.

== Cast ==
The closing credits of this episode list the cast members "in geographical order".

- Rowan Atkinson as The Laird of Roxburgh, Selkirk and Peebles
- Brian Blessed as Richard IV of England
- Alex Norton as MacAngus, Duke of Argyll
- Tim McInnerny as Percy, Duke of Northumberland
- Elspet Gray as Gertrude, Queen of Flanders
- Robert East as Harry, Prince of Wales
- Tony Robinson as Baldrick, Bachelor of the Parish of Chigwell
- Angus Deayton as Jumping Jew of Jerusalem
- Joolia Cappleman as Celia, Countess of Cheltenham
- Martin Clarke as Sir Dominick Prique of Stratford
- Martin Soan as the 2nd Wooferoonie
- Malcolm Hardee as the 3rd Wooferoonie
- David Nunn as the Messenger

== Production ==
As Edmund begins to plot against Dougal McAngus, he has a brief exchange with Baldrick which marks the development of Baldrick's "cunning plan" catchphrase. Actor Tony Robinson later realised the potential for repetition as a comedic device and inserted it into the script of episode 5, "Witchsmeller Pursuivant".

Edmund: Perhaps we need something a little more cunning.
Baldrick: I have a cunning plan.
Edmund: Yes, perhaps, but I think I have a more cunning one.
Baldrick: Mine's pretty cunning, my lord.

== Similarities to the pilot episode ==
The plot of Born to Be King contains a large proportion of material which was originally written for the unaired pilot episode in 1982, in which Prince Edmund arranges the festivities for the Queen's birthday and the Scottish hero Dougal McAngus returns to the court and reveals Edmund's illegitimacy.

The pilot episode differs from Born to Be King a number of respects:

- The pilot episode is set some 100 years later in the 1580s.
- The cast includes different actors playing certain roles – The King, Prince Harry, and Baldrick are played by John Savident, Robert Bathurst and Philip Fox respectively. Prince Harry is named Prince Henry.
- Edmund's character is much more like that of his descendants in the other series: more sarcastic, intelligent and cruel. By contrast, Baldrick and Prince Henry are much stupider than their counterparts in this episode.
- In the pilot, the King is not at the crusades, but at home.
- The event being celebrated is the Queen's birthday, rather than St. Leonard's Day. The pilot also specifies that the reason the Eunuchs will not attend is because Edmund is refusing to pay them, though he still orders them executed anyway.
- MacAngus discovers that Edmund's parentage is in doubt at the same time as the rest of the court, rather than knowingly setting him up to reveal it. Edmund himself is also the person who realises the mistake with the birth dates, rather than Prince Henry/Harry having to point it out.
- Edmund's plot to kill MacAngus involves a hanging with a fake rope, not a staged stabbing with a real dagger, although the plan backfires in much the same way.
- The King remembers Edmund and his name.
- Edmund is Duke of York rather than Duke of Edinburgh.
- Edmund and MacAngus have the duel, rather than having MacAngus slicing Edmund's sword in half before it could start. Edmund actually wins the duel, but is prevented from killing MacAngus when it turns out that Baldrick gave him a theatrical sword from the play.
- Edmund keeps his dignity and composure when begging MacAngus for mercy, delivering his plea through clenched teeth. In Born to be King, he issues his plea in a tearful, snivelling humiliated state.
- Prince Edmund resolves his problem after the duel by apparently getting a Frenchman to confess to forging the letters; in Born to be King, Edmund casts the letters into the fire, merely asserting that they are forgeries.

== References to Shakespeare ==
As with other episodes in this series, the end credits include an acknowledgement of "additional dialogue by William Shakespeare". The script parodies certain elements of the Shakespeare's plays, notably the plot to assassinate Dougal MacAngus, Duke of Argyll which draws on the plot against Hamlet by Laertes and Claudius, and Hamlet is also referenced though the presentation of an Egyptian mock tragedy in the castle, itself a play within a play, a dramatic device used frequently by Shakespeare; the drama piece has echoes of Anthony and Cleopatra and the players mention the "Ides of June", a reference to the Ides of March in Julius Caesar. As well as this, the use of daggers as a plot device and the presence of a Scottish antagonist character allude to Macbeth.
