= The Foretelling =

- Blackadder episode
- Prince Edmund (Rowan Atkinson) is haunted by the headless ghost of Richard III (Peter Cook) after mistakenly decapitating him in battle
- Episode no.: Series 1 Episode 1
- Written by: Rowan Atkinson; Richard Curtis; (with additional dialogue from; William Shakespeare)
- Original air date: 15 June 1983

Guest appearances
- Peter Cook, Peter Benson

Episode chronology
← Previous "The Black Adder"	Next → "Born to Be King"

"The Foretelling" is the first episode of the BBC sitcom The Black Adder, which was the first series of the long-running comedy programme Blackadder. It marks Rowan Atkinson's debut as the character Edmund Blackadder, and is the first appearance of the recurring characters Baldrick (Tony Robinson) and Percy (Tim McInnerny). The comedy actor Peter Cook guest stars as King Richard III.

The Black Adder is a historical comedy set in late Medieval England on the cusp of the Tudor Period, and centres on the eponymous "Black Adder", the pseudonym adopted from this episode onwards by Edmund Plantagenet, Duke of Edinburgh. The premise is that Henry Tudor did not become king in 1485, but instead rewrote history to portray himself as the man who killed Richard III. The show sets out to rectify the situation by telling the "real story" and presents the alternate history of King Richard IV.

The episode's script contains many lines and situations which borrow from or parody William Shakespeare's plays Richard III and Macbeth.

== Plot ==
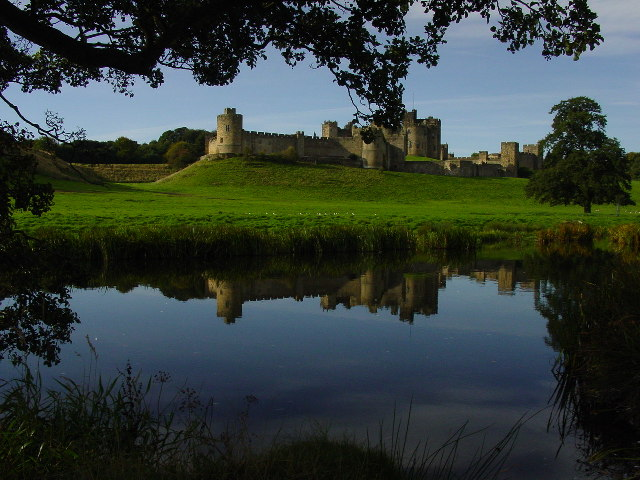
Alnwick Castle, Northumberland, used as a filming location for King Richard's castle

A prologue introduces the episode with a narrative describing the Tudor King Henry VII as one of history's greatest liars - along with Nicolaus Copernicus, instigator of the heliocentrism cosmology theory, and Joseph Goebbels, chief propagandist of the Nazi Party- and establishes the show's premise that he rewrote history to suit his own ends. The narrator dispels the popular depiction of King Richard III of England as a scheming murderer; he appears as a villainous hunchback, hobbling towards his young nephews with a dagger, but the dagger is revealed to be a toy and the hunchback is a sack of presents. A close-up of one of the children fades to a shot of the bearded Richard, Duke of York (Brian Blessed) roaring with laughter, as the narrator declares that he grew up to be "a big, strong boy", and that it was he who was crowned king after winning the Battle of Bosworth Field, not Henry.

The story opens in England in the year 1485 on the eve of the Battle of Bosworth. A feast is held at the castle of King Richard III of England as his court prepares for the next day's battle with the forces led by Henry Tudor. The King (Peter Cook) gives a speech parodying the opening of Shakespeare's play. A young lord's overzealous cheering raises the King's attention, who asks Richard, Duke of York, about the cheerer's identity. Richard doesn't recognise him but his eldest son, Harry, informs him that it is his second son, Edmund – though Richard never calls him that. Instead he calls Edmund other names such as "Edna", starting a running gag lasting throughout the series. He asks Edmund if he will be participating in the battle; Edmund's buffoonish answer makes the King uneasy, but Richard promises that he will place Edmund far away from the King.

Edmund and his friend, Lord Percy Percy, Duke of Northumberland, are joined by a servant Baldrick, who with a bit of flattery manages to win enough favour with Edmund to be chosen as his squire for the morning battle. The next day, both Edmund and Baldrick oversleep. Once woken by Edmund's mother, Gertrude of Flanders, they rush to the battlefield, Edmund by horse and Baldrick by mule. Edmund is initially eager to fight but, observing the combatants from afar, he comes to the realisation that fighting could lead to death. He decides at that moment to remain a spectator and then hides behind a bush to relieve himself.

Meanwhile, the King has won the battle but lost his horse. Telling the Duke of York that he will meet him back at the castle, he wanders off to search for another horse, stumbling across Edmund's steed. Noticing an attempt to steal his horse, Edmund draws his sword and decapitates the apparent thief, only recognising him as King Richard III afterwards. With Baldrick's help, Edmund hides the body in a cottage but forgets the head, which Percy brings, claiming it to be his triumph until realising whose head it is. Before they can escape, a wounded knight begs to be sheltered in exchange for his land and money, but Edmund and Baldrick shake him off. Returning to the castle, Edmund reveals that King Richard is dead, startling his mother and also his father, who has freshly returned from battle. Any doubts are dispelled by Harry, who brings the King's corpse back to the castle from the cottage. Edmund fears retribution for his crime but as everyone assumes Henry Tudor to be the murderer, Edmund escapes punishment, while his father is hailed as the new king, Richard IV.

Edmund, now a royal prince, resolves to become more assertive, hoping to gain his father's respect and approval, and gives himself the title "The Black Adder" (at Baldrick's suggestion who dissuaded him from his first idea, "The Black Vegetable"). To his dismay, Edmund finds out that Percy brought the wounded knight from the cottage back to the castle, but after hearing of his wealth, Edmund lets him stay without asking any further questions.

"Fine! Somebody cut my head off at one point, but otherwise everything went swimmingly!"

— The ghost of Richard III, reflecting on the Battle of Bosworth

Later, Edmund finds himself haunted by the headless ghost of his great-uncle, who openly accuses him of beheading him and even calling him "Edna" in order to taunt him. During the celebratory banquet in honour of the new king, a portrait of Henry Tudor is presented for ridicule, and Edmund is horrified to learn that the wounded man he is sheltering is actually the enemy. Edmund rushes back to his room only to find Henry Tudor gone. Edmund pursues him but the ghost of Richard III chases Edmund into a foggy meadow, where he meets three witches who address the Black Adder as "Ruler of men, Ravisher of women, Slayer of kings" and predict that he shall one day become king. Edmund thus proclaims "History, here I come!" When he leaves the meadow, the witches remark among themselves that they had expected Henry Tudor to look different, before realising that they had prophesied to the wrong person again.

== Cast ==
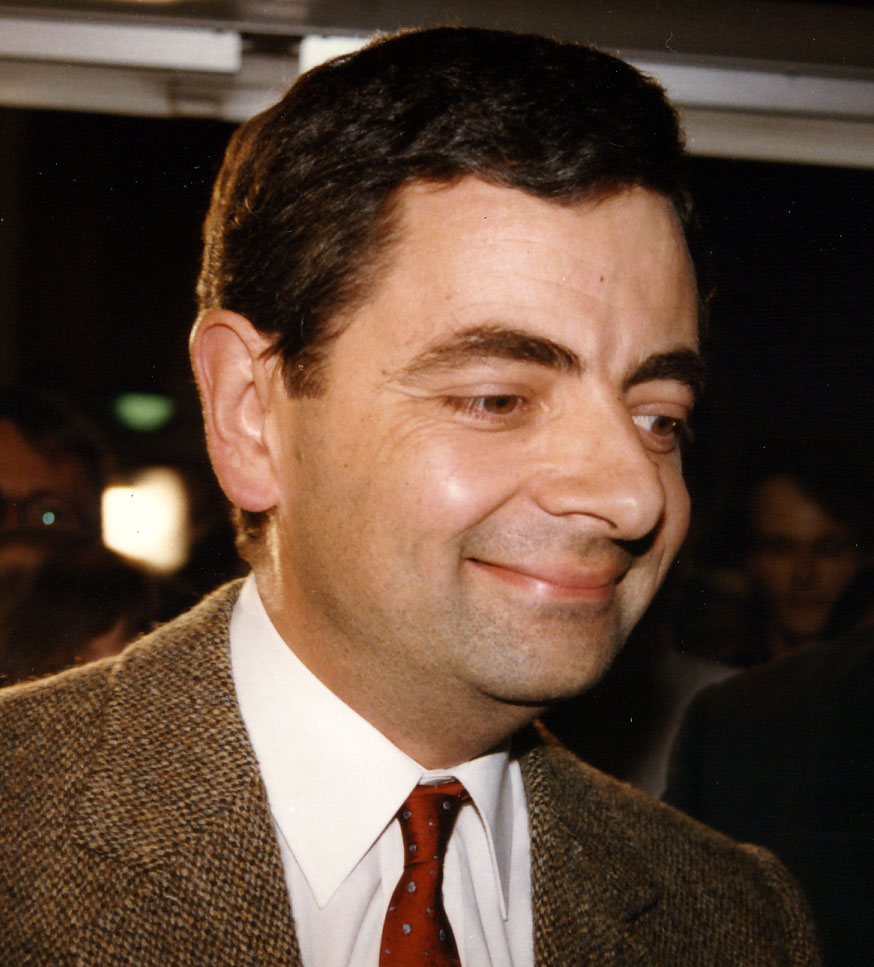
"The Foretelling" marks Rowan Atkinson's 1983 debut in his role as the Edmund Blackadder characters

The closing credits of this episode list the cast members "in order of precedence".

- Peter Cook as Richard III
- Brian Blessed as Richard IV
- Peter Benson as Henry VII
- Robert East as Harry, Prince of Wales
- Rowan Atkinson as Edmund, Duke of Edinburgh
- Tim McInnerny as Percy, heir to the Duchy of Northumberland
- Elspet Gray as The Queen
- Philip Kendall as the Painter
- Kathleen St John as Goneril
- Barbara Miller as Regan
- Gretchen Franklin as Cordelia
- Tony Robinson as Baldrick

== Production ==
"The Foretelling" featured a guest star appearance by veteran comedian Peter Cook as Richard III. Cook had previously worked with Rowan Atkinson, having appeared together in The Secret Policeman's Ball (1979) and Peter Cook & Co (1980). Cook's appearance in this episode as Richard III caused him some alarm; both producer John Lloyd and co-star Brian Blessed have recalled that Cook was very nervous about playing the part. Cook was also not fond of adhering to a script and his lines contained many improvisations. In the end, parts of Cook's performance took the form of a mock-heroic parody of Laurence Olivier's portrayal of the king in the 1955 film version of Shakespeare's play.

== References to Shakespeare ==
Shakespearean inspiration for "The Foretelling"

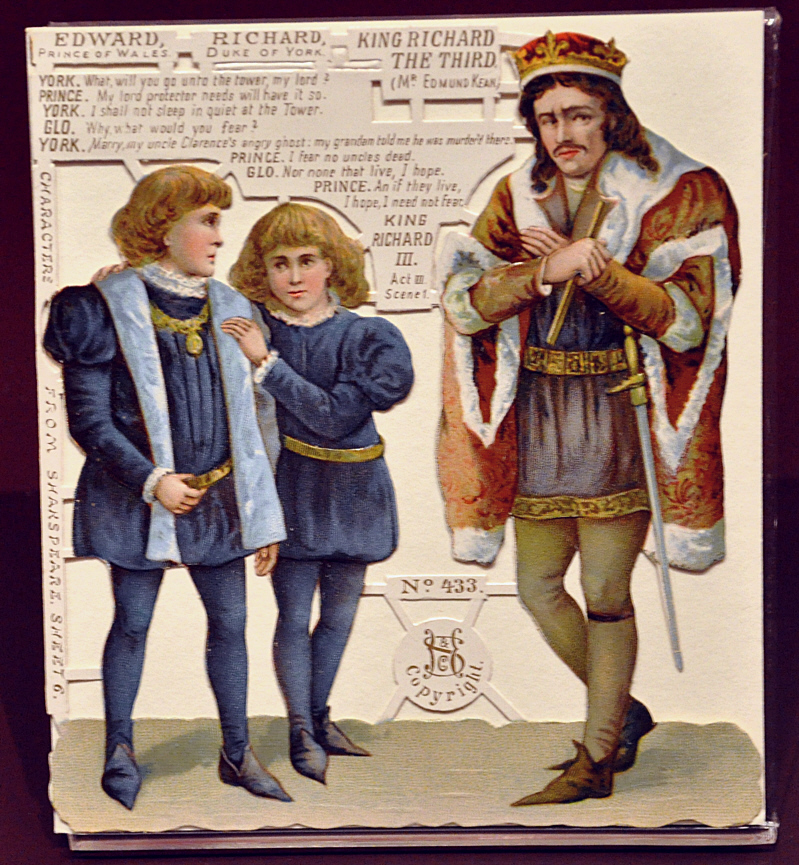
Traditional villainous portrayals of Richard III are ridiculed in The Black Adder

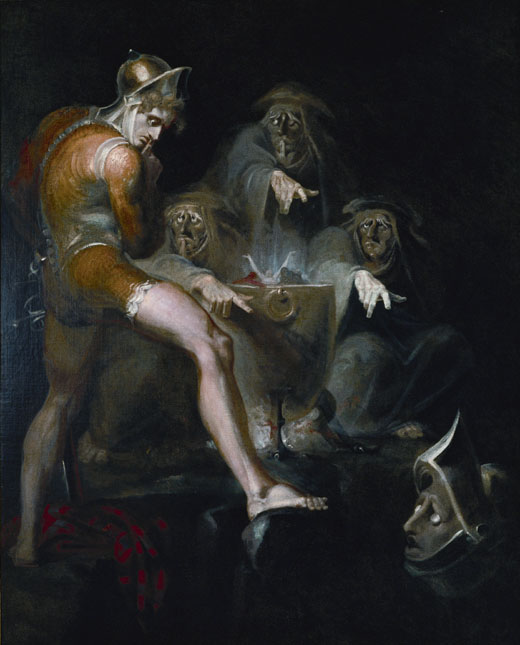
The Three Witches show Macbeth the disembodied head of MacDuff

This first episode of The Black Adder contains many references to the works of Shakespeare and, as with subsequent episodes in this series, the end credits include an acknowledgement of "additional dialogue by William Shakespeare". Most obviously, the script of "The Foretelling" draws on material from Richard III but a number of other aspects of the episode also parody Shakespeare's other works:

- The prologue introduces King Richard III at first as a deformed Shakespearean villain before revealing him to be a kindly and avuncular man who teases his young nephews with a pretend hump, humorously demolishing traditional portrayals of the character. The villainous role is instead taken on by Prince Edmund. Richard's queen consort and Edmund's mother is Gertrude of Flanders; in Hamlet, the protagonist's mother is Gertrude, Queen of Denmark.
- In the opening banquet scene, King Richard gives a speech which is a pastiche of Richard's opening soliloquy, "Now is the winter of our discontent ..." (Richard III, Act I, Scene I).
- Before the Battle of Bosworth, King Richard rouses his troops with a speech, "Once more unto the breach, dear friends, once more..." – words taken directly from King Henry V's speech at the Siege of Harfleur (Henry V, Act 3, Scene I).
- After the battle, Peter Cook's King Richard is heard cheerfully calling "A horse! a horse! my kingdom for a horse!" (Richard III, Act V, Scene IV) in a bathetic style, as if he is whistling for a pet dog.
- Upon discovering the decapitated body of King Richard, Prince Harry makes a sorrowful, mock-heroic speech which comprises one of Mark Antony's lines from Julius Caesar, "O! pardon me, thou bleeding piece of earth," (Julius Caesar, Act III, Scene I), and Horatio's line from Hamlet, "And flights of angels sing thee to their rest" (Hamlet, Act 5, Scene 2).
- The appearance of Richard III's ghost to haunt Prince Edmund during the victory banquet is based closely on the haunting of Macbeth by Banquo's ghost (Macbeth, Act III Scene IV).
- In the final scene, Prince Edmund confronts three witches who foretell that he will become king, in a parody of the Three Witches from Macbeth (Macbeth, Act III Scene IV). In the episode credits, the Black Adder witches are given the names of Goneril, Regan and Cordelia, the names of King Lear's three daughters.
