= Born to Be King =

Born to Be King may refer to:

- Born to Be King (2000 film), a Hong Kong crime drama film, part 6 of the Young and Dangerous film series
- Born to Be King, a 2015 film directed by Puneet Issar
- "Born to Be King" (Blackadder), 1983 season 1 episode 2 of Blackadder
- "Born to Be Kings", alternate titling of the 1986 Queen song "Princes of the Universe"

== See also ==
- The Man Born to Be King (1942 radio drama) a BBC audio play about Jesus Christ
- Jesus
