= Bells (Blackadder) =

- Blackadder episode
- Episode no.: Series 2 Episode 1
- Directed by: Mandie Fletcher
- Written by: Ben Elton; Richard Curtis
- Original air date: 9 January 1986

Guest appearances
- Rik Mayall; Gabrielle Glaister; John Grillo; Edward Jewesbury; Barbara Miller Young

Episode chronology
| ← Previous "The Black Seal" | Next → "Head" |

"Bells" is the first episode of the BBC sitcom Blackadder II, the second series of Blackadder, which was set in Elizabethan England from 1558 to 1603. Although "Bells" was the first to be broadcast on BBC1, it was originally destined to be the second episode.

The plot of the episode, of a young woman disguising herself as a man to go into service and falling in love with her employer, is particularly based on a significant plot thread of William Shakespeare's Twelfth Night.

== Plot ==
Kate, an attractive young woman, and her father, have been left destitute. Kate's father suggests that she become a prostitute to solve their money troubles. Kate refuses and decides to go to London to seek her fortune. She arrives at Lord Edmund Blackadder's house, disguised as a boy named "Bob", and seeking work. Blackadder hires her on the spot, and over the next few weeks, finds himself strangely attracted to his new servant. Lord Melchett and the Queen are concerned by this, and even Blackadder himself begins to worry after he nearly kisses "Bob" during a friendly tussle. He seeks advice from a doctor, who prescribes him to take four leeches. On his servant Baldrick's advice, Blackadder consults "the Wise Woman", who gives him three options: 1) kill Bob; 2) kill himself; or 3) go ahead and sleep with Bob, and to ensure no one ever finds out, kill everyone in the entire world.

With no other options, Blackadder orders Bob out of his service. Kate reveals her secret, and after a brief sexual encounter, Blackadder asks her to marry him, which she accepts. The Queen consents to the marriage after being reassured that Kate's nose is not prettier than hers. Baldrick is chosen as Kate's bridesmaid, while Edmund's choice for best man is his old school chum, Lord Flashheart, whom he describes as "the best sword, the best shot, the best sailor and the best kisser in the Kingdom".

The wedding service does not go as smoothly as planned. Edmund bribes Kate's father to leave before anyone sees him. When it looks like Lord Flashheart might not show up, Blackadder reluctantly asks hanger-on Lord Percy to fill in as his best man. At that moment, Flashheart crashes through the roof, throws Percy out, and begins chatting up every woman in the room. Kate falls in love with Flashheart, who also shares an affinity for crossdressing. The new couple announce they are running away together, before disappearing. Melchett reminds Edmund that in such circumstances, it is customary for the groom to marry the bridesmaid, a suggestion positively received by Baldrick.

== Cast ==
- Rowan Atkinson as Lord Edmund Blackadder
- Tim McInnerny as Lord Percy Percy
- Tony Robinson as Baldrick
- Miranda Richardson as Queen Elizabeth I
- Stephen Fry as Lord Melchett
- Patsy Byrne as Nursie
- Gabrielle Glaister as Kate/Bob
- Rik Mayall as Lord Flashheart
- John Grillo as Dr. Leech
- Edward Jewesbury as Kate's Father
- Sadie Shimmin as The Young Crone
- Barbara Miller as The Wise Woman

== Production ==
"Head" was intended to be the first episode but was swapped after Rik Mayall's performance as Lord Flashheart stole the show. This is evident as Lord Percy shaves his beard in protest but has it again in "Head".

=== Writing ===
The episode marks the first appearance of the Bob/Kate and Flashheart archetypes that appear again in Blackadder Goes Forth. John Lloyd has said that Mayall virtually rewrote his part to feature "loads of jokes", which annoyed the writers, Curtis and Elton. The studio recording took place on Thursday 13 June 1985.

=== Locations ===
This was the only episode of the series to feature location filming, at Wilton House near Salisbury in Wiltshire.

=== Music ===
The music performed as Blackadder courts "Bob" is Vaughan Williams' "Fantasia on Greensleeves".

== In other media ==
=== Audio ===
In 1993, in conjunction with Comic Relief, this episode was given away free on cassette tape with boxes of PG Tips tea.

== Sequels ==
=== Upstart Crow ===
Bob also appears in Ben Elton's 2016 sitcom, Upstart Crow. Gabrielle Glaister reprises the role, and once again plays a woman pretending to be a man, this time in order to be a judge in the episode "The Quality of Mercy". Using the full name "Robert Roberts", it's not been confirmed whether this is the same Bob from Blackadder II.
