= The Crezz =

1976 British TV drama series

- Genre: Drama
- Created by: Clive Exton
- Starring: Joss Ackland; Isla Blair; Peter Bowles; Nicholas Ball; Elspet Gray
- Countries of origin: England, United Kingdom
- No. of series: 1
- No. of episodes: 12

Production
- Producer: Paul Knight
- Running time: 1 hour
- Production company: Thames Television

Original release
- Network: ITV
- Release: 16 September 1976 – 1976

The Crezz is a British television drama produced by Thames Television and shown on the ITV network in 1976. Created by Clive Exton, The Crezz was set in a fictitious West London crescent, Carlisle Crescent. The series was 12 one-hour programmes each focused on a different household. The series was broadcast on ITV at 9pm to start with but midway through it was put back to 10.35pm because the series didn't achieve the viewing figures that were hoped for.

== Regular Cast ==
- Joss Ackland as Charles Bronte
- Elspet Gray as Jackie Bronte
- Briony McRoberts as Esther Bronte
- Joan Hickson as Emily Bronte
- Isla Blair as Emma Antrobus
- Anthony Nicholls as Cyril Antrobus
- Peter Bowles as Ken Green
- Carole Nimmons as Sue Green
- Hugh Burden as Dr. Bernard Balfour-Harvey
- Janet Key as Brenda Pitman
- Nicholas Ball as Colin Pitman
- Jiggy Bhore as Consuela
- Roland Curram as Terry
- Paul Greenhalgh as Denny
- Aimée Delamain as Lady Clarke
- Gerald James as Major Rice
- Eileen O'Brien as Bridget Macarthy
- Alan Devlin as Joe Macarthy
- Elizabeth Begley as Mrs. Macarthy
- Gillian Raine as Angela Hart
- Anton Phillips as Clarence Henderson
- Frank Mills as George Smith
- Hilda Braid as Molly Smith
- Linda Robson as Jane Smith
- Lee Walker as Bing Smith
- Ronald Fraser as Gavin Maddox
- Tariq Yunus as Hafez Aziz
- Bob Hoskins as Detective Sergeant Marble
