= Beer (Blackadder) =

- Blackadder episode
- Episode no.: Series 2 Episode 5
- Directed by: Mandie Fletcher
- Written by: Ben Elton; Richard Curtis
- Original air date: 13 February 1986

Guest appearances
- Hugh Laurie as Simon Partridge; Miriam Margolyes as Lady Whiteadder; Daniel Thorndike as Lord Nathaniel Whiteadder; Roger Blake as Geoffrey Piddle; William Hootkins as Freddie Frobisher

Episode chronology
← Previous "Money"	Next → "Chains"

"Beer" is the fifth episode of the sitcom Blackadder II, which aired on BBC1 on 13 February 1986. The episode marks Miriam Margolyes's second and Hugh Laurie's first ever Blackadder appearance with Laurie going on to appear in every subsequent episode of the show.

== Plot ==
Blackadder receives a letter informing him that his fanatically Puritan but extremely wealthy aunt and uncle, Lord and Lady Whiteadder, will be visiting him to discuss the terms of his inheritance over dinner. Baldrick informs Blackadder that Queen Elizabeth demands Blackadder's presence at court as his rival, Lord Melchett, is very sick. Blackadder rushes to Richmond Palace to discover that Melchett is suffering from a dire hangover. Blackadder and Melchett taunt each other over their lack of alcoholic tolerance. Blackadder agrees to challenge Melchett to a drinking bout that night, with 10,000 florins at stake.

Back at his house, Blackadder begins to draft a guest list for the party, with Percy's assistance. Percy reminds him that the Whiteadders will also be coming to dinner that evening. Blackadder returns to the Queen and asks that the contest be delayed; however, she suspects that he is trying to back out and refuses to postpone the contest. Blackadder decides to host both events, but in different rooms of his house. He tells Baldrick to hand him water when he calls for his "incredibly strong ale" during the party.

The Whiteadders soon arrive at Blackadder's home. Lord Whiteadder has taken a "vow of silence", leaving Edmund's abusive and volatile aunt Lady Whiteadder to hold conversations. When the drinking guests show up, Blackadder leads them to Baldrick's bedroom, where they become intoxicated, and subsequently rowdy and destructive. Blackadder is forced to conceal the goings-on from his aunt and uncle. The Queen arrives at the party, disguised as Percy's girlfriend Gwendolyn, and Blackadder, not realising who she is, locks her in the closet.

Melchett calls Blackadder out for not participating in the contest. Blackadder calls for his ale, but Baldrick inadvertently exposes his ruse, prompting Melchett and the other competitors to force Blackadder to drink a very strong ale. Blackadder soon re-enters the dining room, drunkenly informing Percy that he has lost the bet. Lady Whiteadder reminds Blackadder that receiving the inheritance requires that he avoid drinking and gambling.

In the hallway, Melchett's drinking crew assume the Whiteadders to be strippers, and release the Queen from the closet. Queenie announces she is going to first "have a little drinkie" and then have everyone executed. By dawn the following morning, everyone is hung over and sitting in Blackadder's dining room, confused as to what has happened.

== Cast ==
- Rowan Atkinson as Edmund Blackadder
- Tim McInnerny as Lord Percy Percy
- Tony Robinson as Baldrick
- Miranda Richardson as Queen Elizabeth I
- Stephen Fry as Lord Melchett
- Patsy Byrne as Nursie
- Miriam Margolyes as Lady Whiteadder
- Daniel Thorndike as Lord Nathaniel Whiteadder; the role was originally offered to Jim Broadbent, who was unavailable, as a reference to the double act role he played opposite Margolyes in the first series.
- Hugh Laurie as Simon Partridge, a drunk aristocrat who is also known as Mr. Ostrich and Farters Parters
- Roger Blake as Geoffrey Piddle, a "deranged civil servant"
- William Hootkins as Freddie Frobisher, the flatulent hermit of Lindisfarne (listed as "Monk" in credits)
