= Money (Blackadder) =

- Blackadder episode
- Episode no.: Series 2 Episode 4
- Directed by: Mandie Fletcher
- Written by: Ben Elton; Richard Curtis
- Original air date: 6 February 1986

Guest appearances
- Ronald Lacey - The Bishop of Bath and Wells; Cassie Stuart - Molly; Lesley Nicol - Mrs. Pants; John Pierce Jones - Arthur the Sailor; Tony Aitken - Poor Tom; Philip Pope - Leonardo Acropolis; Piers Ibbotson - Messenger; Barry Craine - Mr. Pants

Episode chronology
← Previous "Potato"	Next → "Beer"

"Money" is the fourth episode of the BBC sitcom Blackadder II, the second series of Blackadder, which was set in Elizabethan England from 1558 to 1603.

== Plot ==
Blackadder is visited by the baby-eating Bishop of Bath and Wells, who reminds him that he owes £1,000 to the Bank of the Black Monks. The bishop threatens to sodomise Blackadder with a hot poker if he does not repay the money.

Lord Percy offers his savings to Blackadder, but Blackadder has already long since found Percy's hiding place and spent his money, as well as Baldrick's. Blackadder has only £85 to his name, which he loses to the Queen following a bet she had about him with Melchett.

Blackadder tries selling Baldrick into prostitution, but makes only a sixpence from a sailor named Arthur, which the Queen also takes. Percy then tries to produce gold using alchemy, but only manages to produce a mysterious green substance.

Deciding to sell his house, Blackadder bullies a couple into paying him £1,100, but is again tricked out of this by the Queen.

Blackadder attempts run away to avoid the Black Monks after losing the money for the Queen's trickery. But Baldrick points out that the bank has several branches and informs his master that not only will people not remember Blackadder fondly when he dies, but will be laughing and call him "old privy-breath". Baldrick also claims that people use Blackadder's name as a byword or a slang for sliping on dog faeces, as they say "Whoops, I’ve trod on an Edmund."

Outraged that he is a figure of mockery to the Queen and general public, Blackadder comes up with his own cunning plan and sends Baldrick out to obtain a number of items, including a sleeping draught and the finest portrait painter in England. Baldrick returns with the painter.

The bishop visits Blackadder again and prepares to carry out his threat to Blackadder for not paying his debts. Before he does so, the bishop drinks some wine offered to him by Baldrick, which he has drugged, and falls unconscious.

The bishop is later woken up by Blackadder, who reveals a painting made of the bishop in a highly compromising position with another figure. He uses this to successfully blackmail the bishop into writing off the debt and giving Blackadder more than enough money to buy back his house. The bishop is impressed by the treachery and asks Blackadder who the other figure is, at which point Blackadder reveals Lord Percy.

== Cast ==
- Rowan Atkinson as Lord Edmund Blackadder
- Tim McInnerny as Lord Percy Percy
- Tony Robinson as Baldrick
- Miranda Richardson as Queen Elizabeth I
- Stephen Fry as Lord Melchett
- Patsy Byrne as Nursie
- Ronald Lacey as the Bishop of Bath and Wells
- Cassie Stuart as Molly
- Lesley Nicol as Mrs. Pants
- John Pierce Jones as Arthur the Sailor
- Tony Aitken as the Mad Beggar
- Philip Pope as Leonardo Acropolis
- Piers Ibbotson as the Messenger
- Barry Craine as Mr. Pants

== Legacy ==
- Bishop of Bath and Wells' Lingering torment of Blackadder, from the Telegraph (7 Dec 2008)
