= Tony Aitken =

English actor (born 1946)

- Born: 20 June 1946 (age 79); Solihull, Warwickshire, England
- Occupation: Actor
- Years active: 1968–present

Tony Aitken (born 20 June 1946) is an English actor, known for his appearances in various television programmes.

He attended Belmont Abbey School, Hereford, 1959–64. He was active in the amateur dramatic society, appearing in many revues, plays and Gilbert and Sullivan productions. He acted with Neville Buswell another student at the school. Trained as a Drama and Art Teacher at St. Mary's University College, London 1964–67.

Over a forty five year career in theatre and TV, he has appeared in shows such as The Sweeney, Porridge, The Mistress, Agatha Christie's Poirot, Holby City, Casualty, End of Part One and No. 73, in films such as Robin Hood Junior, Jabberwocky, Quincy's Quest and The Remains of the Day .

His best-known role is perhaps as the "Merry Balladeer" in the closing titles of Blackadder II, in which he also portrayed a madman ("pity poor Tom") in "Money". In addition to his acting career, he now runs a broadcast audio studio, producing and voicing radio and TV commercials. In 2011 he played the part of solicitor "Ben Dean" in several episodes of Coronation Street. He played "Professor Aubrey" in the Feature Film "The Arbiter" 2013.

== Filmography ==
Year	Title	Role	Notes
1975	Robin Hood Junior	Jugge	
1977	Jabberwocky	Flagellant	
1979	Quincy's Quest	Teddy / Father Christmas	
1987	Hearts of Fire	Reporter #1	
1993	The Remains of the Day	Postmaster	
2013	The Arbiter	Aubrey	
