= Stephen Tate =

British actor and musical theatre artist

Stephen Tate is a British actor and musical theatre artist.

== Career ==
=== Television ===
He is possibly best known for his recurring role as Alan in the 1970s television drama Survivors and as Dick Meyer in the 1980s comedy drama Big Deal alongside Ray Brooks.

His other credits include Z-Cars, The Onedin Line, Blake's 7, Yes Minister, The Black Adder, Dear John, Boon, The Bill, Minder, Cardiac Arrest, Silent Witness and Emmerdale. He played Monsieur Fauchlevant in the 2012 film version of Les Misérables

=== Musical theatre ===
Tate has had a distinguished career in London's West End:

- Judas in the original West End cast of Jesus Christ Superstar.
- Gregory Gardner in A Chorus Line.
- Gus the Theatre Cat and Growltiger in the original West End production of Cats.
- Thenardier in Les Misérables.
- Created the role of Richard I (Richard the Lionheart) in Blondel.
- Jacob/Guru/Potiphar in Joseph and the Amazing Technicolour Dreamcoat.

Tate portrayed Babet in Les Misérables in Concert: The 25th Anniversary. He also starred as Jesus Christ in the Christian band and DVD "Hero".

== Filmography ==
=== Film ===
Year	Title	Role	Notes
1990	Peter in Magicland	The Gingerbread Man	
2010	Les Misérables in Concert: The 25th Anniversary	Babet	
2012	Les Misérables	Fauchelevent	

=== Television ===
Year	Title	Role	Notes
1975	You're on Your Own	Det. Con. Brown	Episode: "Value for Money"
1975	Private Affairs	Cantoni	Episode: "Caesar and Claretta"
1976	Z-Cars	Det. Sgt. Smith	Episode: "Ringers"
1976	Survivors	Alan	4 episodes
1976	The Crezz	Arthur	Episode: "Fire Down Below"
1978	Blake's 7	Mandrian	Episode: "Mission to Destiny"
1978	Going Straight	Canadian Tourist	Episode: "Going to Work"
1979	Emmerdale	Eric Dawtrey	5 episodes
1980	Sweet Nothings	Kershaw	Episode #1.1
1980	The Onedin Line	Makepiece	Episode: "Blood Lines"
1980	A Little Silver Trumpet	Ned	2 episodes
1981	Yes Minister	Billy Fraser	Episode: "The Compassionate Society"
1983	Icebound in the Antarctic	Leonard Hussey	2 episodes
1983	Blackadder	Lord Chiswick	Episode: "The Queen of Spain's Beard"
1984–1986	Big Deal	Dick Mayer	25 episodes
1986	A Dangerous Kind of Love	Coolidge	Television film
1987	Dear John	Skab	Episode: "Kate Returns"
1988	Floodtide	Ray Palmer	2 episodes
1988	Boon	Alan Clark	Episode: "Have a Nice Day"
1989	Joint Account	Mr. Tooley	Episode #1.1
1989–1993	The Bill	Michael Lovett / Dr. Alan Haycraft	4 episodes
1990	T-Bag	Mark Question	Episode: "Mutiny!"
1990	The Chief	Det. Supt. Brian Kale	3 episodes
1991	Perfect Scoundrels	Inky	2 episodes
1993, 1995	Casualty	Nick Carson / Paul Fisher	2 episodes
1994	Minder	Fitzgibbon	Episode: "Bring Me the Head of Arthur Daley"
1994	Cardiac Arrest	Mr. Edwards	Episode: "Turning out the Light"
1994	Wycliffe	Sid Passmore	Episode: "The Scapegoat"
1996	Kavanagh QC	Patrick Bennett	Episode: "Men of Substance"
1996	Bramwell	Harry	Episode #2.1
2015–2016	Last Road	Trevor	3 episodes
