= David Nunn (actor) =

British actor (1962–2012)

- David Nunn as the Messenger in The Black Adder (1983)
- Born: 4 August 1962
- Died: 26 April 2012 (aged 49); Stevenage, Hertfordshire, England
- Occupation: Actor

David Nunn (4 August 1962 – 26 April 2012) was a British actor perhaps best known for playing the Messenger in The Black Adder in 1983.

Nunn attended Clissold Park School in Hackney. His television appearances included Gang Member in Shades of Greene (1975), himself in Fun Food Factory (1976), Mark Valenta in A Place to Hide (1976), Headmaster (1977), Sid in Television Club (1978), Graham's Gang (1977–79), Charlie in Maggie and Her (1979), Tim in Metal Mickey (1981), Brookdale Boy in Grange Hill (1981), Kid in Educating Marmalade (1982), Messenger in The Black Adder (1983), Joe in The Pickwick Papers (1985), Apprentice in Mister Corbett's Ghost (1987), Enormous Orphan in Blackadder's Christmas Carol (1988) and Starting Out (1989).

When his acting career dried up he began to train as a taxi-driver in London before becoming a van driver in Cheshunt in Hertfordshire. After a period as a driving instructor from 2004, Nunn was an ambulance transport driver from 2006/7 until his death in 2012 of a heart attack aged 49 at the Lister Hospital in Stevenage.
