= Bert Parnaby =

British actor (1924–1992)

James Bertram Parnaby (4 March 1924 – 30 July 1992) was a British actor who was notable for a string of TV and Film roles from the 1960s through the 1980s. His TV roles included performances in Blackadder, By the Sword Divided, Juliet Bravo, Inspector Morse and Last of the Summer Wine. In 1988, he appeared as Father Christmas in the BBC adaptation of The Lion, the Witch and the Wardrobe. His film credits included Prick Up Your Ears (1987), The Dressmaker (1988) and The Reunion (1989).

Whilst living in Didsbury, Bert was a schoolmaster at Manchester Grammar School during the 1950s and early 1960s. Teaching English, he was greatly involved in the production of teachers’ plays. He subsequently became an HMI (one of Her Majesty's Inspectors of Schools).

On leaving the education profession, Parnaby worked as a producer and performer for the BBC. His monologues on breakfast radio often started ‘I hate …’, for example the edition about the Post Office, which was based on the Didsbury branch, albeit unnamed.

Parnaby died in July 1992 at the age of 68, shortly after the death of his wife Jane. A bench in their memory was later erected in Drummer Street, Cambridge.
