= Elspet Gray =

Scottish actress (1929–2013)

- Born: Elspet Jean MacGregor Gray; 12 April 1929; Inverness, Scotland
- Died: 18 February 2013 (aged 83); London, England
- Occupation: Actress
- Years active: 1948–2013
- Spouse: Brian Rix (m. 1949)
- Children: 4, including Jamie and Louisa

Elspet Jean Gray (née Gray; 12 April 1929 – 18 February 2013) was a Scottish actress, who first became known for her partnership with her husband, Brian Rix, and later was cast in many television roles in the 1970s and 1980s. She played Lady Collingford in the television series Catweazle and Mrs. Palmer in the television series Solo, alongside Felicity Kendal.

== Career ==
Gray had a long stage career, particularly known for her appearances in the Whitehall farces, the company being managed by her husband Brian Rix, which were originally performed at the Whitehall Theatre and later at the Garrick.

Gray appeared in many films and television programmes, her earliest being The Blind Goddess (1948). In 1955 she appeared in an episode of Strange Experiences. She had several roles in the 1970s including parts in Fawlty Towers, as the paediatrician wife of a psychiatrist baffled by Basil Fawlty’s behaviour, The Crezz, Catweazle, and in the 1980s with Doctor Who story Arc of Infinity and the World War Two drama Tenko. She appeared as the Queen in the BBC sitcom The Black Adder (1983), with Rowan Atkinson as her son in the title role, and as Mrs. Palmer in Solo (1981–82), another comedy, this time with Felicity Kendal in the lead as her daughter.

Gray continued her acting career until the late 1990s, appearing in Agatha Christie's Poirot, the films The Girl in a Swing (1988) and Four Weddings and a Funeral (1994), and as Hilary in the British television comedy Dinnerladies.

== Personal life and death ==
Gray married Brian Rix in 1949. She died in hospital on 18 February 2013, aged 83.

== Filmography ==
Year	Title	Role	Notes
1948	The Blind Goddess	Daphne Dearing	
1948	Fly Away Peter	Phyllis Hapgood	
1948	Love in Waiting	Brenda Lawrence	
1949	Trottie True	Honor Bellaire	Uncredited
1951	Reluctant Heroes	Lt. Virginia	
1954	Johnny on the Spot	Joan Ingram	
1954	Devil's Point	June Mallard	
1961	The Night We Got the Bird	Woman with dog	
1969	Goodbye, Mr. Chips	Lady Sutterwick	Uncredited
1979	Fawlty Towers	Dr Abbott	
1982	The Agatha Christie Hour	Sylvia Carslake	
1983	Blackadder	Gertrude of Flanders	
1987	Inspector Morse	Mrs Bartlett	Episode - "The Silent World of Nicholas Quinn"
1988	The Girl in a Swing	Mrs. Dresland	
1990	Double Sin	Miss Penn	
1994	Four Weddings and a Funeral	Laura's Mother – Wedding One	
1998	dinnerladies	Phillipa's mother - Hilary	
