= Robert East (actor) =

Welsh actor

- Born: Robert Gwyn East; 7 July 1943 (age 83); Porthcawl, Wales
- Occupation: Actor
- Years active: 1967–present

Robert Gwyn East (born 7 July 1943) is a Welsh theatre and TV actor. He also wrote Incident at Tulse Hill, first produced at the Hampstead Theatre in December 1981 under the direction of Harold Pinter.

East played Harry, the Prince of Wales, in BBC comedy series The Black Adder (1983). In 1981, he played J.D. Cassels in the series Lady Killers. His other television appearances include regular appearances on Dave Allen at Large (1973–1979), as well as roles in Emma (1972), Napoleon and Love (1974), Moody and Pegg (1974), Rentaghost (1976), Happy Ever After (1976), Potter (1980), Kelly Monteith (1980), Yes Minister (1982), Terry and June (1985), Rumpole of the Bailey (1987), Yes, Prime Minister (1987), Bread (1987), Alfred Crackenthorpe in the '4:50 from Paddington' episode of Miss Marple (1987), 'Allo 'Allo! (1991), Heartbeat (2003), The Witness for the Prosecution (2016) and Babs (2017). He also made a brief appearance as a soldier in the film Figures in a Landscape (1970).
