= List of Blackadder episodes =

This is an episode list of the British sitcom Blackadder. The original release date listed for each episode is its original airdate on BBC1.

== Series overview ==
Series	Episodes	Originally released	
Series	Episodes	First released	Last released
Pilot		15 June 2023	
1	6	15 June 1983	20 July 1983
2	6	9 January 1986	20 February 1986
3	6	17 September 1987	22 October 1987
Specials	2	5 February 1988	23 December 1988
4	6	28 September 1989	2 November 1989
Back & Forth		31 December 1999	

== Episodes ==
=== Pilot ===
Title	Directed by	Written by
"The Black Adder"	Geoff Posner	Richard Curtis & Rowan Atkinson
The pilot of The Black Adder was first broadcast on 15 June 2023 on UKTV's Gold channel; the story-line was also used for the episode "Born to Be King".

=== Series 1: The Black Adder (1983) ===
The episodes in this series were originally shown on BBC1 on Wednesdays, 21:25 – 22:00. Note: The "Ultimate Edition" DVD retains the broadcast order, which switched the second and fourth episodes as "Born to Be King" was not ready for transmission, despite on-screen dates continuing to identify the true order as "Born to Be King", "The Archbishop", and "The Queen of Spain's Beard".

No. overall	No. in series	Title	Directed by	Written by	Original release date
1	1	"The Foretelling"	Martin Shardlow	Richard Curtis & Rowan Atkinson	15 June 1983
2	2	"Born to Be King"	Martin Shardlow	Richard Curtis & Rowan Atkinson	22 June 1983
3	3	"The Archbishop"	Martin Shardlow	Richard Curtis & Rowan Atkinson	29 June 1983
4	4	"The Queen of Spain's Beard"	Martin Shardlow	Richard Curtis & Rowan Atkinson	6 July 1983
5	5	"Witchsmeller Pursuivant"	Martin Shardlow	Richard Curtis & Rowan Atkinson	13 July 1983
6	6	"The Black Seal"	Martin Shardlow	Richard Curtis & Rowan Atkinson	20 July 1983

=== Series 2: Blackadder II (1986) ===
The episodes in this series were originally shown on BBC1 on Thursdays, 21:30 – 22:00. The episode titles are single word references to the theme of the episode: a wedding, executions, voyages of exploration, debt, drinking alcohol, and imprisonment, respectively.

No. overall	No. in series	Title	Directed by	Written by	Recorded date	Original release date
7	1	"Bells"	Mandie Fletcher	Richard Curtis & Ben Elton	13 June 1985	9 January 1986
8	2	"Head"	Mandie Fletcher	Richard Curtis & Ben Elton	9 June 1985	16 January 1986
9	3	"Potato"	Mandie Fletcher	Richard Curtis & Ben Elton	23 June 1985	23 January 1986
10	4	"Money"	Mandie Fletcher	Richard Curtis & Ben Elton	30 June 1985	6 February 1986
11	5	"Beer"	Mandie Fletcher	Richard Curtis & Ben Elton	7 July 1985	13 February 1986
12	6	"Chains"	Mandie Fletcher	Richard Curtis & Ben Elton	14 July 1985	20 February 1986

=== Series 3: Blackadder the Third (1987) ===
The episodes in this series were originally shown on BBC1 on Thursdays, 21:30 – 22:00. The episode titles use alliteration in parody of the titles of Jane Austen's novels Sense and Sensibility and Pride and Prejudice.

No. overall	No. in series	Title	Directed by	Written by	Recorded date	Original release date
13	1	"Dish and Dishonesty"	Mandie Fletcher	Richard Curtis & Ben Elton	19 June 1987	17 September 1987
14	2	"Ink and Incapability"	Mandie Fletcher	Richard Curtis & Ben Elton	5 June 1987	24 September 1987
15	3	"Nob and Nobility"	Mandie Fletcher	Richard Curtis & Ben Elton	10 July 1987	1 October 1987
16	4	"Sense and Senility"	Mandie Fletcher	Richard Curtis & Ben Elton	12 June 1987	8 October 1987
17	5	"Amy and Amiability"	Mandie Fletcher	Richard Curtis & Ben Elton	26 June 1987	15 October 1987
18	6	"Duel and Duality"	Mandie Fletcher	Richard Curtis & Ben Elton	3 July 1987	22 October 1987

=== Series 4: Blackadder Goes Forth (1989) ===
The episodes in this series were originally shown on BBC1 on Thursdays, 21:30 – 22:00. The episode titles are, with exception of the final episode, puns on military ranks.

No. overall	No. in series	Title	Directed by	Written by	Recorded date	Original release date
19	1	"Captain Cook"	Richard Boden	Richard Curtis & Ben Elton	27 August 1989	28 September 1989
20	2	"Corporal Punishment"	Richard Boden	Richard Curtis & Ben Elton	3 September 1989	5 October 1989
21	3	"Major Star"	Richard Boden	Richard Curtis & Ben Elton	10 September 1989	12 October 1989
22	4	"Private Plane"	Richard Boden	Richard Curtis & Ben Elton	17 September 1989	19 October 1989
23	5	"General Hospital"	Richard Boden	Richard Curtis & Ben Elton	24 September 1989	26 October 1989
24	6	"Goodbyeee"	Richard Boden	Richard Curtis & Ben Elton	1 October 1989	2 November 1989

=== Specials ===
No.	Title	Directed by	Written by	Original release date
1	"Blackadder: The Cavalier Years"	Richard Boden	Richard Curtis & Ben Elton	5 February 1988
England is in civil war, and Blackadder is harbouring the most wanted man in the country: King Charles I.
2	"Blackadder's Christmas Carol"	Richard Boden	Richard Curtis & Ben Elton	23 December 1988
A parody of Charles Dickens' book A Christmas Carol. As Christmas approaches, Ebenezer Blackadder gets a surprising meeting with the Ghost of Christmas Present.

=== Back & Forth ===
Title	Directed by	Written by	Original release date
"Back & Forth"	Paul Weiland	Richard Curtis & Ben Elton	31 December 1999
As the new millennium dawns, Blackadder tries to con his friends out of £30,000 with a fake time machine which, thanks to Baldrick, unexpectedly works up to a point.

== Additional appearances ==
Blackadder and Baldrick, or one of them, have also appeared frequently as guests in other shows or live shows, often for charity.

Title	Written by	Original release date
"Woman's Hour Invasion"	Richard Curtis & Ben Elton	28 September 1988
Woman's Hour is a show on BBC Radio 4 consisting of reports, interviews and debates aimed at women, and also includes short serials during the last quarter of the show. On one instance of the show, in 1988, Blackadder and Baldrick show up, travel back in time and talk to Shakespeare and others. The purpose of the "invasion" was to raise money for Children in Need.
"Children in Need"	Richard Curtis & Ben Elton	18 November 1988
Terry Wogan interviews Blackadder and Baldrick, both of which appear and behave as they are in series 3, with Blackadder insulting both Baldrick and Terry Wogan. This special cameo was done during a TV appeal for Children in Need.
"Clown Court"	Richard Curtis	1988
Clown Court was an item on Noel's Saturday Roadshow in which Noel Edmonds presented blooper compilations in a mock court setting. Tony Robinson appeared as Baldrick, who stands accused of a number of bloopers from the third series, and is sentenced to death.
"Cooking with Baldrick on Blue Peter"	Unknown	9 March 1989
Baldrick shares a recipe on a Blue Peter special. This short cameo was included on the bluray edition of Blackadder in 2023.
"Baldrick on Smellovision (CBBC Comic Relief 1991)"	TBD	1991
Tony Robinson as Baldrick joined presenter Andi Peters in the Broom Cupboard for a brief skit also featuring the Psammead (puppet) from the 1991 BBC children's show Five Children and It.
"Blackadder and the King's Birthday"	Ben Elton	14 November 1998
A short sketch performed at the Prince of Wales' 50th Birthday Gala. It featured Rowan Atkinson as Lord Blackadder and Stephen Fry as King Charles II. Baldrick is mentioned as being Lord Blackadder's servant, but does not appear. The live-on-stage sketch was televised on ITV (in the UK) on 14 November 1998.
"Blackadder: The Army Years"	Ben Elton	19 October 2000
A short monologue performed at the Dominion Theatre for the Royal Variety Performance 2000. It features Rowan Atkinson as the modern-day Lord Edmund Blackadder of Her Royal Highness's regiment of Shirkers, offering a proposal to restore England's glory by invading France. The sketch was written and introduced by Ben Elton, who was the compère of the evening.
"The Jubilee Girl"	Richard Curtis	29 December 2002
The Jubilee Girl was a BBC special about the making of the Party at the Palace, a concert held on the grounds of Buckingham Palace for Queen Elizabeth II's Golden Jubilee. The concert had been reluctantly announced on the BBC by Sir Osmond Darling-Blackadder, Keeper of the Royal Lawn Sprinklers, and while he does not appear in connection with the actual concert, he makes a few brief appearances in The Jubilee Girl to provide a humouristic note.
"The Banking Crisis"	Ben Elton	28 September 2012
A new Blackadder sketch about the banking crisis, performed at a special charity gala event "We Are Most Amused" in aid of the Prince’s Trust. Sir Edmund Blackadder is the chief executive of the Melchett, Melchett & Darling bank, who brings his gardener Sodoff Baldrick to an enquiry.
"Red Nose Day 2023"	Richard Curtis & Tony Robinson	17 March 2023
Baldrick returns alone to read “Balderella” about himself and Edmund Blackadder (absent) for the 2023 BBC Red Nose Day.

== Retrospectives and documentaries ==
Title	Original release date
"Baldrick's Diary: A Blackadder In The Making"	31 December 1999
A featurette on the shooting of Back & Forth, in the form a video diary narrated by Baldrick. It includes several deleted scenes from the movie.
"Blackadder Exclusive: The Whole Rotten Saga"	8 October 2008
A 90-minute documentary produced by Tiger Aspect for UKTV Gold. It featured interviews with most of the major cast members and other contributors, including Stephen Fry, Hugh Laurie, Richard Curtis, Ben Elton, Miranda Richardson, Tim McInnerny and Tony Robinson and was narrated by comedian David Mitchell. Rowan Atkinson did not appear except in archival footage. It was followed by another hour with a compilation called 'Most Cunning Moments' where celebrities and invited guests vote on their favourite scenes.
"Blackadder Rides Again"	25 December 2008
A 60-minute documentary produced by Tiger Aspect for the BBC and broadcast on 25 December 2008, to celebrate the 25th anniversary of the show. It featured interviews with all of the major cast members and other contributors, including Rowan Atkinson, Stephen Fry, Hugh Laurie, Richard Curtis, Ben Elton, Miranda Richardson, Tim McInnerny and Tony Robinson. Rather than relying on 'talking head' interviews and clips from the show, the documentary included several pieces of rare, and even unseen material (behind the scenes clips, cut scenes from Series 1 etc.). It also reunited certain cast and crew members with their costumes, visited cast members on their current ventures, or took them to the original filming locations.
"Blackadder: The Lost Pilot"	15 June 2023
Sir Tony Robinson introduces the first UK screening of the long-unaired pilot episode on Gold, and discusses its genesis with Richard Curtis, Ben Elton and Howard Goodall.
