= Goodbyeee =

- Blackadder episode
- General Melchett almost catches Blackadder pretending to be mad. Melchett represents the "lions led by donkeys" perception of the war, and is an amalgam of Douglas Haig and John French, among others.
- Episode no.: Series 4 Episode 6
- Directed by: Richard Boden
- Written by: Richard Curtis; Ben Elton
- Original air date: 2 November 1989
- Running time: 29 minutes

Guest appearance
- Geoffrey Palmer as Field Marshal Haig

"Goodbyeee", or "Plan F: Goodbyeee", (Note: The on-screen title in this episode reads "Goodbyeee"; some sources list it with the prefix "Plan F", signifying the sixth episode.) is the sixth and final episode of Blackadder Goes Forth, the fourth and final series of British historical sitcom Blackadder. The episode was first broadcast on BBC1 in the United Kingdom on 2 November 1989, shortly before Armistice Day. Apart from the one-off short film Blackadder: Back & Forth made a decade later, it was the last episode of Blackadder to be produced and transmitted.

The episode depicts its main characters' final hours before a major British offensive on the Western Front of the First World War, and Captain Blackadder's attempts to escape his fate by feigning madness; after he fails to convince General Melchett, and Field Marshal Haig's advice proves useless, he resigns himself to taking part in the offensive. "Goodbyeee" has a darker tone than other episodes in the series, culminating in its acclaimed ending in which the main characters are assumed to have died. The episode's theme of death ties in with the series' use of gallows humour, its criticism and satire of war, and its depiction of authority figures contentedly sending their subordinates to face the enemy, while unwilling to do so themselves.

Richard Curtis and Ben Elton wrote the episode, and further material was provided by cast members. The final sequence, which shows the main characters going "over the top", uses slow motion, as the programme's creators were unhappy with the result of the scripted ending. The enhanced scene has been described as bold and highly poignant.

== Plot ==
=== Background ===
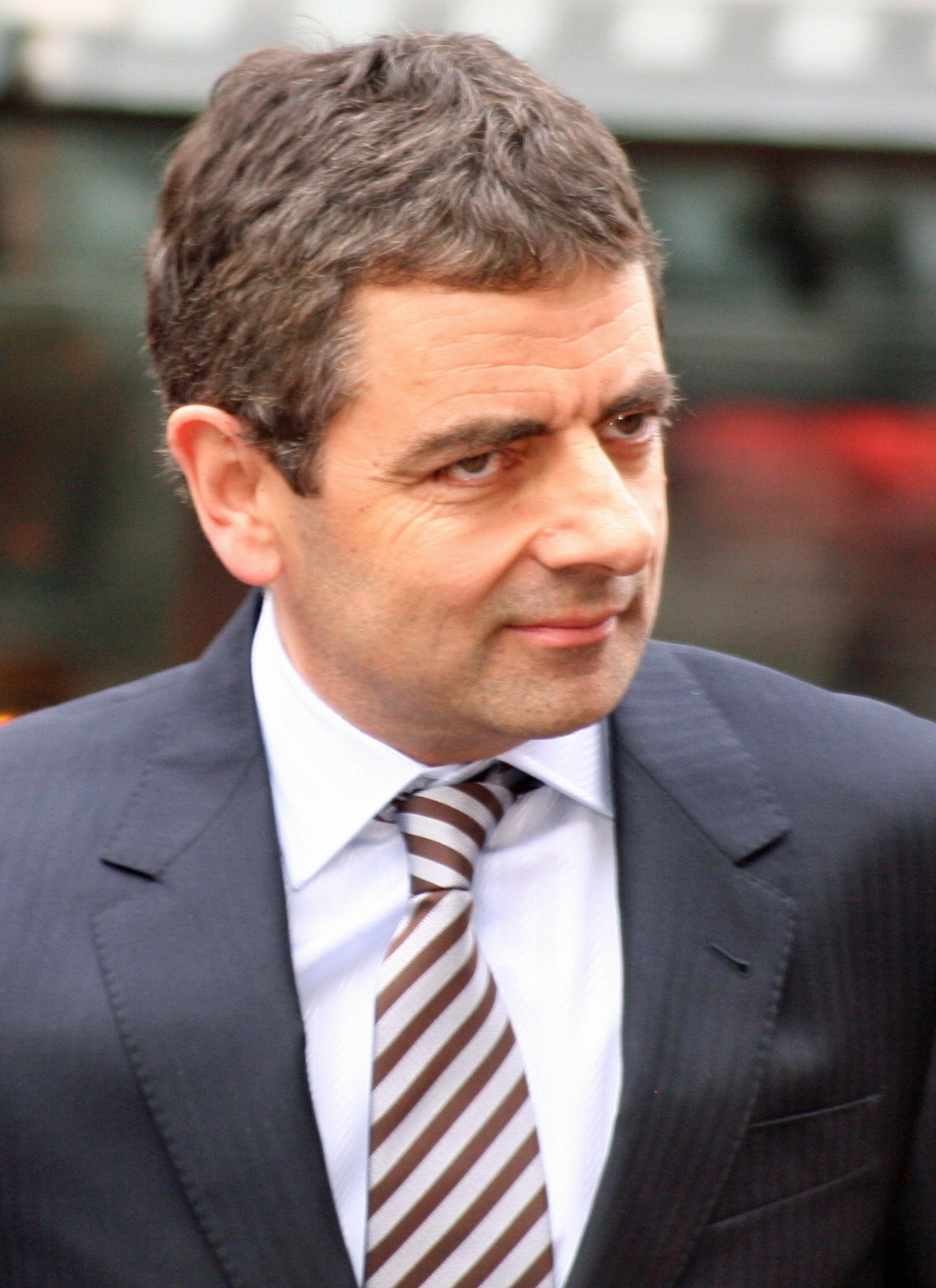
Rowan Atkinson played Captain Blackadder in the series.

Each series of Blackadder depicts its protagonist, always a scheming and (except in the first series) witty man named Edmund Blackadder, in different periods throughout history. In Blackadder Goes Forth, he is Captain Blackadder, an officer in the British Army on the Western Front during the First World War.

Joined by his colleagues – the poor, stupid and unhygienic Private Baldrick (Tony Robinson), and the overly optimistic, upper-class and equally idiotic Lieutenant George Colthurst St Barleigh (Hugh Laurie) – Blackadder tries constantly to escape his position and avoid the "big push", which he fears will result in his death. His efforts are hindered by the loud and intimidating General Melchett (Stephen Fry) and Melchett's strict, sardonic, and jobsworth staff officer, Captain Kevin Darling (Tim McInnerny).

=== Events ===
Captain Blackadder's trench receives a phone call from HQ: a full-scale attack has been ordered for the next day at dawn. Realising that this is likely to mean his death, Blackadder plans to escape by pretending to be mad, he puts underpants on his head and sticks pencils in his nostrils, a trick he learned in the Sudan. His plan is thwarted when General Melchett arrives to see what is happening and remarks that he shot an entire platoon that used this method; Blackadder overhears and narrowly escapes Melchett's punishment by pretending he is relating the story to Baldrick before dismissing him.

After inspecting the men, Melchett compliments Blackadder on his troops but when Baldrick reveals he does not love the King, Melchett punches him, wishing Blackadder, George and their troops good luck, informing them there is no place at the front for a General who has a "dicky heart" and "wooden bladder". He leaves after George declines his offer not to participate in the push, and Baldrick suggests that Blackadder ask Field Marshal Douglas Haig to get them out; remembering that Haig owes him a favour, Blackadder decides to call in the morning. George, Baldrick and Blackadder discuss the War and the friends they have lost. George mentions the Christmas truce of 1914 (in which the belligerents stopped fighting to play football) and realises he is the only "Trinity Tiddlers" member still alive; this is paralleled in Baldrick's pets, who have all died. Back at HQ, Melchett surprises Captain Darling with a frontline commission. Darling's pleas to reconsider are misinterpreted, and Melchett insists that he go.

The following morning, Blackadder calls Field Marshal Haig and reminds him of his debt. While sweeping toy soldiers off a map and into a dustpan, Haig reluctantly agrees to help on the condition that Blackadder never contacts him again; Blackadder agrees. To his dismay, Haig advises using the previously attempted underpants method, ending the call with "favour returned", causing Blackadder to remark, "I think the phrase rhymes with 'Clucking bell'", realising his fate has been sealed. Darling arrives, and his animosity with Blackadder dissolves as they are both put in the same situation. George tries to cheer everybody up, but finds himself as scared as the others, something Baldrick agrees with. Darling states that he had hoped to live through the War, return to the United Kingdom and marry his fiancée.

"Whatever it was, I'm sure it was better than my plan to get out of this by pretending to be mad. I mean, who would've noticed another madman around here? Good luck, everyone."

— Captain Blackadder, on Baldrick's final plan

The men are then called to the trench to prepare for the big push. There is a moment of hope when the British barrage lifts, but Blackadder reminds his colleagues that they have stopped only to avoid hitting their own men. Baldrick tells Blackadder that he has a plan to escape certain death, but for the first time in any series, does not call it a "cunning plan". Blackadder replies that Baldrick's idea will have to wait, but admits it could not fail to improve over his own plan to feign insanity because "who would have noticed another madman round here?" Blackadder earnestly wishes his comrades good luck, and they charge over the top into thunderous machine gun fire. The sequence enters slow motion as a slow piano version of the Blackadder theme is played. The violent chaos of no man's land fades into a tranquil field of poppies, with only birdsong heard in the background.

== Production ==
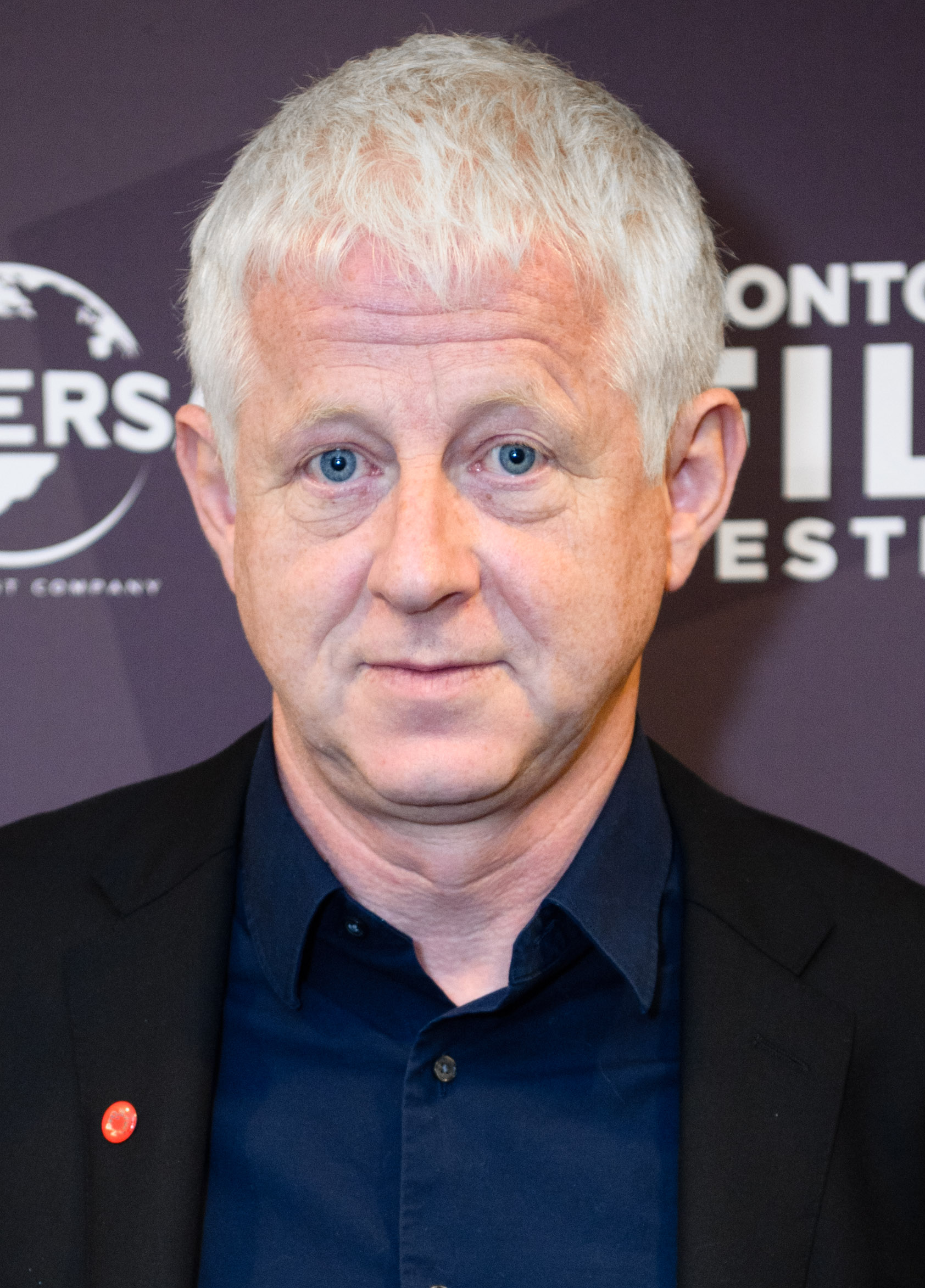
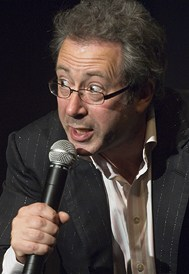
Richard Curtis and Ben Elton wrote "Goodbyeee"; Curtis co-created Blackadder, and Elton had co-written it since the second series.

The episode was written by Richard Curtis and Ben Elton, who swapped computer disks to make edits. They stuck to a rule whereby they could not add back material the other had removed. The script was collaboratively edited by the cast members of Blackadder Goes Forth during read-throughs. Elton was primarily responsible for the sequence in which Blackadder explains how the First World War started; the running gag of Baldrick using mud and bodily fluids to make coffee throughout the episode was greatly expanded during rehearsals.

The episode's title is a reference to the popular First World War song "Good-bye-ee!", which was based on a catchphrase of the comedian Harry Tate. The song is also heard in an earlier episode—"Major Star". The title is a departure from those of previous Blackadder Goes Forth episodes, which are puns on military ranks.

During the filming of the episode, which took place before a studio audience at BBC Television Centre, Rowan Atkinson described sharing his character's dread of impending death and feeling a "knot in the pit of my stomach", something that he had never experienced. Hugh Laurie said that filming was sad because "even for comic effect, we were representing the deaths of hundreds of thousands of people". Regarding guest star Geoffrey Palmer, the producer John Lloyd said "[We] probably could have given [him] more attention", calling him "a wonderful actor" who is "really just delivering three or four plot lines [pieces of dialogue essential to the plot]".

The slow motion and fade effects at the end of the episode were not scripted, but the decision to use them was made in editing after the final scene was hastily filmed on an unconvincing polystyrene set, ruining the poignancy of the sequence; the episode's director Richard Boden added the poppy field image. The piano version of the theme tune was performed by Howard Goodall and recorded in a gymnasium, giving it what Lloyd described as a "liquid, lonely sound". The episode's end credits were omitted. Tim McInnerny did not know about these changes before the episode aired, and has said that he found the ending particularly emotional.

== Themes ==
In the episode, Field Marshal Haig is shown casually sweeping away toy soldiers with a dustpan and brush; BBC News Magazine's Finlo Rohrer called this a "visual allusion to his callousness", but quoted the historian Gary Sheffield as saying "The real Field Marshal Haig was certainly not a callous man. He was commanding the largest British army ever. Whatever he did, you ended up with lots and lots of casualties." Sheffield also noted that "Melchett is an amalgam of Haig and John French and the other generals", so Haig effectively "appears twice". The series, especially the storyline of "Goodbyeee", often depicts the "lions led by donkeys" perception of the War, an element of Blackadder Goes Forth that has been criticised by historians.

In his book The Great War, Ian F. W. Beckett also cited Sheffield: the latter commented that Blackadder Goes Forth was successful because "the characters and situations needed no explanation, so familiar was the audience with the received version of the war". Beckett noted the popularity of the episode's final scene, and compared it to a similarly popular scene from Dad's Army. He said that this comparison demonstrates the observation made by historian A. J. P. Taylor that the Second World War has been regarded as a "good war" in comparison to the first; he opined that "television producers...have much to answer for in the perpetuation of the image of the Great War as one in which a generation of 'lions' were needlessly sacrificed by the 'donkeys'".

The ending shows a field of poppies to reflect on the deaths of soldiers; it was inspired by John McCrae's poem "In Flanders Fields".

Producer John Lloyd cited the episode's lack of another major character as the reason they had time to "explore the relationships of the five principal people". Atkinson said that the scene involving Darling's "ghastly realisation" of his commission was "very sad"; Lloyd commented "I love the fact that Captain Darling does have some compassion; he's not just a bureaucrat". They noted that "all the comedy just goes away" upon Darling's arrival in the trench, and that "there are still funny moments, but dramatically, there is no comic content, it is just leading inexorably to the end."

Comparing the ending scene to those of previous series of Blackadder, in which the main characters were also killed, writer Curtis commented: "I think it was by chance that [previous series] ended with Blackadder being killed...but series four, we did do it very much on purpose." He said that he and Elton felt they could use the First World War as a setting if the characters died, considering "if we did do that...it would not be too disrespectful, and would actually represent some of the tragedy of the First World War".

== Reception ==
Following its original broadcast on BBC1 at 9:30 pm on 2 November 1989, "Goodbyeee" was praised for its powerful and memorable ending. One journalist called the scene "a classy ending to a television classic", and the Sunday Times said that it was "brave" and "properly responsible" of the writers to end the series poignantly, especially when the episode aired close to Remembrance Day.

"Goodbyeee" has also been the subject of more recent reviews: Rob Cromwell of The Guardian listed the final scene among six "perfect end-of-show finales", saying of Blackadder: "It was brilliantly funny throughout, right up until the last 60 seconds", and praising the writers and producer Lloyd for "deliver[ing] a perfectly pitched, poignant ending". Comparing Blackadder Goes Forth to the 2012 war serial Birdsong, Alison Graham of the Radio Times commented that "Nothing...evokes the terror of those unspeakable battlefields or leaves such an overwhelming sense of loss as [its characters] going over the top to their certain death". Den of Geek's Carley Tauchert placed the episode second on her list of "top 10 TV show endings", calling it "one of the greatest interpretations of the madness of war that has ever been put on film". Reviewing the episode for The A.V. Club, Kate Kulzick described it as "...a masterpiece, a hilarious and painful crystallization of everything Blackadder does well. It is without a doubt the best episode of the series and more than that, it is one of the best series finales in television history". She particularly praised it for "...its masterful balancing of comedy and tragedy. Both are interspersed throughout, with each character given moments of laugh out loud brilliance and poignant reflection", concluding that "...there is no such thing as a perfect television show or episode, but 'Goodbyeee' comes dang close". The academic and theatre director Mary Luckhurst contrasted the regular British comedic treatment of the Second World War with the absence of comedies set in the First World War, until the Blackadder series, which she considered "an important British dramatic treatment" of the War. Of the final episode Luckhurst wrote:

"Goodbyeee" went a good deal further than any other sitcom or comedy, by terminally sending pretty much the entire cast over the top in 1917, into a silence that has...endured ever since. Many millions of viewers were shocked, and almost all taken aback by the abrupt realization of tragedy amid much-loved national television and after riotous laughter to that sudden and bitter end ...

In a poll conducted by Channel 4 and The Observer to determine television's one hundred most memorable moments, the final scene of "Goodbyeee" came ninth; it was one of only two entries in the top ten that was not news coverage (the other being a scene from Only Fools and Horses). In 2001, Radio Times asked a panel of comedians, writers and producers to pick their "50 favourite sitcom moments"; "Goodbyeee" was the only episode of Blackadder that was included, where it ranked eleventh. The British Film Institute's Screenonline called the episode's ending "unexpectedly moving", and noted that, unusually for a comedy programme, it was repeated as part of a serious commemoration of Armistice Day: for its 80th anniversary in 1998. The series' overview from the website of UKTV's channel Gold, which airs repeats of Blackadder, calls the final episode "a seamless blend of gallows humour and rich poignancy" and "a fitting end to an iconic series". In his segment advocating for Blackadder to be voted Britain's Best Sitcom, broadcaster and journalist John Sergeant called the final sequence "the one sitcom moment with claims to immortality".

Some historians of the First World War have taken a different view. William Philpott referred to the series, by name, as "bathetic" and felt it part of a "post-facto generalisation of the nature of their war" that "sucked in" even veterans of the conflict; in other words, the First World War soldier had become a "victim" in the public consciousness, a circumstance at odds with the historical record. The impact of Blackadder on the public consciousness was so pervasive that Gordon Corrigan referenced it in his book cover copy when he published Mud, Blood, and Poppycock, which was an attempt to "dispel various myths" about the war.

== See also ==
- 1989 in British television
- List of Blackadder episodes
