= Blackadder Goes Forth =

Fourth series of the BBC sitcom Blackadder

- Title screen of Blackadder Goes Forth featuring Rowan Atkinson
- Written by: Richard Curtis; Ben Elton
- Directed by: Richard Boden
- Starring: Rowan Atkinson; Tony Robinson; Hugh Laurie; Stephen Fry; Tim McInnerny
- Theme music composer: Howard Goodall
- Country of origin: United Kingdom
- Original language: English
- No. of episodes: 6 (list of episodes)

Production
- Producer: John Lloyd
- Running time: 30 minutes

Original release
- Network: BBC1
- Release: 28 September – 2 November 1989

Related
- Blackadder's Christmas Carol; Blackadder: Back & Forth

Blackadder Goes Forth is the fourth series of the BBC sitcom Blackadder, written by Richard Curtis and Ben Elton, which aired from 28 September to 2 November 1989 on BBC1. The series placed the recurring characters of Blackadder, Baldrick, and George as British Army soldiers in a Flanders trench during World War I, and followed their various doomed attempts to escape from the trenches to avoid death under the misguided command of General Melchett. The series references famous people of the time and criticises the Army's leadership during the war, culminating in the ending of its final episode, in which the soldiers are ordered to carry out a lethal charge of enemy lines.

Despite initial concerns that the comedy might trivialise the war, it was acclaimed and won the British Academy Television Award for Best Comedy Series in 1989. In 2000 it was placed 16th by industry professionals in a list of the 100 Greatest British Television Programmes compiled by the British Film Institute. However, some historians and politicians have criticised it for presenting an inaccurate view of the war, reinforcing the myth of "lions led by donkeys".

== Plot ==
Blackadder Goes Forth is set in 1917 on the Western Front in the trenches of World War I. Captain Edmund Blackadder (Rowan Atkinson) is a professional soldier in the British Army who, until the outbreak of the Great War, has enjoyed a relatively danger-free existence fighting natives who were usually "two feet tall and armed with dried grass". Finding himself trapped in the trenches with another "big push" planned, his concern is to avoid being sent "over the top" to probable death. The series thus chronicles Blackadder's attempts to escape the trenches through various schemes, most of which fail due to bad fortune, misunderstandings and the general incompetence of his comrades. The aforementioned comrades are his second-in-command, idealistic upper-class Edwardian twit Lieutenant George St Barleigh (Hugh Laurie) and their profoundly stupid but dogged batman Private S. Baldrick (Tony Robinson).

More than the Germans, who are generally unseen, Blackadder's nemesis come in the form of his superior, the eccentric General Melchett (Stephen Fry) who rallies his troops from a château 35 miles (56 km) from the front, and Melchett's bureaucratic assistant, Captain Kevin Darling (Tim McInnerny). Despite the two being of equal rank, Blackadder treats Darling with contempt – while the former is on the front line, the latter is "folding the general's pyjamas". Their animosity is mutual, largely as a result of Blackadder exploiting the comic potential of Darling's surname at every opportunity.

=== Themes ===
Blackadder Goes Forth is darker in tone than the previous three Blackadder series and most sitcoms, and presents an anti-war message. The dialogue is marked throughout by satirical musings about the nature of the war, its origins and the effects on the soldiers who suffered over its course. The idea that the soldiers suffered whilst their commanders remained safely distant from the action was also referenced on many occasions, such as when Melchett says to Baldrick, "Don't you worry my boy, if you should falter, remember that Captain Darling and I are behind you!", to which Blackadder responds, "About 35 miles behind you." In the episode "Corporal Punishment", Blackadder justifies the shooting for food of a carrier pigeon (which turns out to be Melchett's pet, Speckled Jim) by saying, "With 50,000 men getting killed a week, who's going to miss a pigeon?" This episode sees Blackadder being sentenced to death by firing squad for the act, a reference to the capital sentences carried out under the laws of war in force at the time.

In "Private Plane", after receiving word that Blackadder and Baldrick may have been killed when shot down over German lines, Melchett tries to cheer George up by showing him a life-size model (measuring seventeen square feet) of land recaptured by the British, a commentary on the high human cost and small physical gains achieved by attacks in the middle years of the war. Later in the same episode, Blackadder describes the Great War as "a war which would be a damn sight simpler if we just stayed in England and shot 50,000 of our own men a week".

Field Marshal Douglas Haig, whose orders are alleged to have resulted in hundreds of thousands of British deaths at the battles of Passchendaele and the Somme, is continually referenced. Blackadder himself describes Haig's attempts at an advance as no more than "another gargantuan effort to move his drinks cabinet six inches closer to Berlin" and, when asked by Melchett for suggestions to improve the troops' morale, jokingly suggests Haig's resignation and suicide. In "Goodbyeee", a scene parodies Haig's professional abilities by depicting the field marshal (portrayed by Geoffrey Palmer) playing with toy soldiers, which he sweeps nonchalantly from trench to trench and then into a rubbish bin, while listening to Blackadder's plea to get out of the big push on the telephone.

The series recalls a number of actual historical events of the war, such as the Christmas truce of 1914. Blackadder recalls the event: "Both sides advanced further during one Christmas piss-up than they did in the next two and a half years of war." References are also made to the popular culture of the era, as well as the previous series. The episode "Private Plane" sees the return of the characters of Lord Flashheart and Bob from the second series episode "Bells" and also an appearance of the German flying ace, the Baron von Richthofen. A plot thread in the third episode "Major Star" involves Blackadder's dislike of the silent film star Charlie Chaplin, whom he finds "as funny as getting an arrow through the neck, and then finding there's a gas bill tied to it".

In the fifth episode "General Hospital", the anti-German sentiment in Britain during the war is repeatedly referenced. General Melchett orders Blackadder to find out who is behind the leak in top-secret battle plans and immediately, though erroneously, pins it on a "German spy" (who is later discovered to be one of their own). Blackadder interrogates Captain Darling, who vehemently denies being a spy and says that he is "as British as Queen Victoria", to which Blackadder sarcastically replies "So your father is German, you're half German and you married a German?". Blackadder's retort references the fact that Victoria was a member of the House of Hanover and that her husband Prince Albert was a prince from the House of Saxe-Coburg and Gotha. In 1917, Victoria's grandson, King George V, changed the name of the royal house from Saxe-Coburg and Gotha to Windsor in an effort to appease British nationalist feelings.

The final episode of this series, "Goodbyeee", although true to the series' usual comedy style through most of the preceding scenes, featured a non-comedic final scene, in which the main characters (except General Melchett) are finally sent over the top. Darling keeps some sense of hope, saying this may be the very last battle and history will write the conflict as "The Great War, 1914–1917!". Disregarding Baldrick's claim to have one last plan to save them from the impending doom, Blackadder delivers the final line:

Well, I'm afraid it'll have to wait. Whatever it was, I'm sure it was better than my plan to get out of this by pretending to be mad. I mean, who would have noticed another madman around here? [whistles blow along the line, signalling the start of the attack] Good luck, everyone. [blows whistle]

To the sound of a slow, minimal piano version of the title theme, the four are seen in slow-motion, charging into the fog and smoke of no man's land, with gunfire and explosions all around. The script states that they "will not get far". The scene then fades into footage of a sunny poppy field and the sound of birdsong.

== Episodes ==
The series aired for six episodes broadcast on BBC1 on Thursdays at 9.30pm between 28 September and 2 November 1989, ending nine days before Remembrance Day. The titles of the first five episodes, "Captain Cook", "Corporal Punishment", "Major Star", "Private Plane" and "General Hospital" are puns based on the pairing of a military rank and another word related to the episode's content. The final episode, "Goodbyeee", was the title of a period song.

No. overall	No. in series	Title	Directed by	Written by	Recorded date	Original release date
19	1	"Captain Cook"	Richard Boden	Richard Curtis & Ben Elton	27 August 1989	28 September 1989
Field Marshal Haig's new plan is to commission a man who can do a splendid painting for the front cover of the next issue of the King And Country propaganda magazine, which Blackadder hates. When Blackadder is made the new Official War Artist, he is allowed to leave the trenches, for No Man's Land.
20	2	"Corporal Punishment"	Richard Boden	Richard Curtis & Ben Elton	3 September 1989	5 October 1989
In order to avoid being ordered to go over the top, Blackadder fakes bad telephone communications and then shoots a carrier pigeon – which is revealed to be a prized pet of General Melchett. With George as his attorney in a farcical court-martial, Blackadder works to avoid execution by firing squad. Guest appearance by Jeremy Hardy as Corporal Perkins.
21	3	"Major Star"	Richard Boden	Richard Curtis & Ben Elton	10 September 1989	12 October 1989
Following the withdrawal of the Russians from the war, Blackadder is placed in charge of an entertainment show to boost the troops' morale and, if successful, will take the show to London. Unfortunately, Melchett has fallen in love with Blackadder's leading "lady", the fair Georgina (George in drag). After a date with Melchett, the General asks "Georgina" to marry him, and George, fearing punishment for disobeying a superior officer, accepts. Guest appearance by Gabrielle Glaister as Bob.
22	4	"Private Plane"	Richard Boden	Richard Curtis & Ben Elton	17 September 1989	19 October 1989
After a visit from Lord Flashheart, Blackadder, Baldrick and George intend on joining the "Twenty Minuters" of the Royal Flying Corps in order to go to Paris. After Blackadder and Baldrick crash their plane behind enemy lines, they are captured by the Germans. Guest appearances by Rik Mayall as Lord Flashheart, Gabrielle Glaister as Bob, and Adrian Edmondson as Baron Manfred von Richthofen.
23	5	"General Hospital"	Richard Boden	Richard Curtis & Ben Elton	24 September 1989	26 October 1989
George ends up in a field hospital after a bomb strikes Blackadder's trench. Melchett and Darling task Blackadder with finding a German spy who is in the hospital and leaking battle plans. Instead, Blackadder embarks on a relationship with Nurse Mary Fletcher-Brown. Guest appearance by Miranda Richardson as Nurse Mary Fletcher-Brown and Bill Wallis as Brigadier-General Sir Bernard Proudfoot-Smith.
24	6	"Goodbyeee"	Richard Boden	Richard Curtis & Ben Elton	1 October 1989	2 November 1989
Blackadder and his friends are finally going into battle. Blackadder attempts to escape by feigning madness, placing his underpants on his head and sticking two pencils up his nose. When all attempts to avoid combat fail, the group are sent over the top. Guest appearance (billed as "Special Guest Brass Hat") by Geoffrey Palmer as Field Marshal Douglas Haig. The final scene was voted the ninth most memorable television moment of all time in a 1999 poll of The Observer and Channel Four.

== Production ==
=== Writing and rehearsals ===
Occasionally it got a bit frosty and negative. But, generally speaking, it was just people staring at the ceiling and thinking about a line for 25 minutes. It was fun but tiring. Very tiring.

— Rowan Atkinson (2003)

Writers Ben Elton and Richard Curtis wrote the scripts for Blackadder episodes separately using word processors and then swapped the disks containing the scripts for each other to add or remove jokes and dialogue. Curtis recalls that they stuck to a policy whereby if one removed a line for not being funny, then it was never put back.

During rehearsals, the script was exhaustively discussed and redrafted by the cast, with Richard Curtis having the final say on the content. Fry, Laurie and Atkinson were comic writers and performers themselves, and having worked together on previous series were not afraid to question the script and make suggestions. For example, Captain Darling was originally called Captain Cartwright and was renamed when Stephen Fry recalled a boy at his school with the surname Darling, who had found his own surname a constant embarrassment. Curtis recalls that he was initially reluctant to change the name, as he considered it a one-off joke.

Speaking to The Times about the ending of the show in 1989, Curtis hinted that the collaborative writing process caused tensions amongst the cast:

Everybody on the show thinks they can put in good jokes, despite the fact that Ben Elton and I think there are already quite a few good ones in there to start with. It does usually end up funnier, but it's time to do something over which I have more control.

Twenty years on, Curtis recalled in the documentary Blackadder Rides Again that: "They would literally sit around for the entire time discussing the script... sometimes we would just say to them 'if you stood up and tried to act this script out, you would find out things about it.'" Ben Elton stated that by opening it up, they allowed the cast to question every aspect of the script.

During Blackadder Rides Again, Tony Robinson likewise recalls that these script meetings could be uncomfortable, and has been less reserved speaking about the script rehearsals since. In an interview with The Daily Telegraph he suggests that although relations between the actors were generally cordial "There was bad feeling between the writers and the performers – the writers felt we were unilaterally altering the script and altering it for the worse. At end of the first day of rehearsals, the writers would go away and by the time they came back we would have changed an awful lot of it. By the end, they felt we had run away with it. There were quite a lot of emotions flashing around about that."

Producer John Lloyd, speaking to The Times in 1989, hinted that it was the draining scripting and rehearsal process that led to the writers deciding not to make another series:

Things do get very tense by the end of a series, because everyone involved in the thing is very clever, and very funny, and they all want to push the scripts along. It's a very exhausting process, and by the end of it we all swear we'll never, ever, do another one. But then you start to think how rare it is to get so many good people in the same room and you talk yourself into doing another series.

=== Casting ===
Left to right: Tim McInnerny, Rowan Atkinson, Stephen Fry, Tony Robinson and Hugh Laurie in Blackadder Goes Forth

Rowan Atkinson and Tony Robinson reprised their roles as Edmund Blackadder and Baldrick respectively. Hugh Laurie also returned to play Lieutenant George. The fourth series enlarged the principal cast from the third series to include Stephen Fry as General Melchett and Tim McInnerny as Captain Kevin Darling, who had both appeared in guest roles in Blackadder the Third and had appeared regularly in Blackadder II. This cast appeared together in every episode of the fourth series, although the only episode to feature no guest appearances was "Captain Cook". Miranda Richardson, who had played Elizabeth I in the second series, appeared in a guest role in one episode (as she had in the third series). In their guest performances, actors such as Rik Mayall and Gabrielle Glaister reprised versions of characters they had played in earlier series. Other performers, such as Bill Wallis and Lee Cornes, who had played minor roles in prior series, appeared briefly again in the fourth series as well. Of the series, only Adrian Edmondson and Geoffrey Palmer portray fictitious takes on historical figures as Baron Manfred von Richthofen and Field Marshal Douglas Haig respectively.

=== Taping ===
This series of Blackadder was one of the first television programmes in Britain to be made and transmitted with stereo sound, using the NICAM digital system, even though most viewers could only afford, or were only able to receive due to their location, the standard FM mono audio carrier signal.

The series was directed by Richard Boden and all interior scenes were shot at BBC Television Centre in front of a live studio audience. Rowan Atkinson recalls that the studio shooting could present him with problems:

That sitcom tradition is very strange when you're performing to both a camera and an audience at the same time...The thing that sometimes held us up is my stammer. Some words and some phrases did catch me out..."B"s in particular. I remember one episode in which Stephen Fry and Hugh Laurie were going "woof" a lot, and my line was "it's like Battersea Dogs Home in here". The B of Battersea was a problem for me. The floor manager suggested that I say "Crufts" instead.

Atkinson has said that in the build-up to the final episode, he began to psychologically experience something of his character's apprehension. Speaking to Michael Parkinson in 2003, he recalled

I remember... in the weeks leading up to the one-day recording of that final episode when we went over the top, for the first time in my acting career... knowing that even though the rest of the episode was its usual standard funny sitcom self, there was this deep twist in my stomach throughout that week thinking along with your character that you were doomed. It was most peculiar. I'm sure serious character actors feel this all the time... Obviously if you're trying to feel the character and his dilemma then you're going to experience some of the fictional feelings for real. You felt swept along by it.

Other than the title sequence, the series used little exterior shooting. To create the flying sequences in the episode "Private Plane", footage from the 1976 film Aces High was re-edited and dubbed over with the actors' voices. The most challenging scene to shoot was the final "over the top" sequence, which was recorded in a separate studio set, away from the audience, which had been rigged with special effects to simulate a battlefield.

On viewing the original studio rushes for the 20th anniversary documentary Blackadder Rides Again, John Lloyd recalls that originally the final scene was "all very embarrassing", as the actors only had 15 ft (4.6 m) to run before they reached the barbed wire in front of the camera, where they had to pretend to die, an effect described by Atkinson as "somewhat unconvincing". It was only in post-production that the final effect was achieved by running the video and audio in slow motion and fading another video of the empty set over the top to make it appear as if the characters had disappeared. This image of a barren landscape was then faded into a still image of a poppy field found in the BBC Picture Library.

=== Titles and music ===
The theme melody was a variation on the Blackadder theme by Howard Goodall over opening title images of Blackadder and George parading their men past Melchett and Darling, while Baldrick plays the triangle. The title music starts with the opening bars of "The British Grenadiers" before segueing into the familiar Blackadder theme. In the closing credits, the full Blackadder theme plays over visuals of armed men marching on a parade ground. The sequences were filmed and recorded on location at the former Colchester Cavalry Barracks, with the production using 50 members of the 3rd Battalion, the Royal Anglian Regiment to represent Blackadder's men, attired in reproduction First World War uniforms, with the battalion's band providing the music.

The titles are presented as static captions instead of being rolled as in the previous three series. The crew credits are presented in pseudo-military fashion: for example, the designer is credited thus: "Dgr – 404371 Hull, C". The opening sequence is filmed in colour, while the closing sequence was treated in post-production to appear grainy, streaky, and sepia toned in imitation of newsreels of the era.

"Goodbyeee" has no closing titles, simply fading from the protagonists charging across no man's land under fire, to a field of poppies in the sunlight, a reference to the poem "In Flanders Fields" and the flower's symbolic significance. The music was also changed to a slow, echoey solo piano arrangement (recorded in a school gymnasium), finishing with three strong bass-drum notes, interposed with sound effects of gunshot, and later birdsong. In the 25th anniversary special interview, Richard Curtis stated that the production team had not planned such an ending and the idea of the scene fading to the poppy field was only conceived after some of the cast stated their reluctance in doing a second take.

== Reception ==
=== Subject ===
Emma Hanna, in her book The Great War on the Small Screen, has noted that some contemporary reviewers felt the topic of the First World War to be inappropriate for a comedy series, with one newspaper critic uncertain of the writers' motives: "is [the series] justified in using tragic situations as a springboard for comedy merely for entertainment value?". Ben Elton's uncle, the historian Geoffrey Elton, "was at first most unhappy at what he considered to be an insulting portrayal of the army", although "he later took the view that the satire was drawn with great respect".

The issue of the series' subject matter was of concern to the producers. Atkinson recalled in an interview with Michael Parkinson that the poignant ending of the final episode was in part written to counter the possibility of criticism that the subject was inappropriate for a comedy. Speaking during filming in 1989, he remarked that despite the 20th century setting, the trenches were particularly apt for the Blackadder series:

We wanted a place and a time that could reproduce to a certain extent the claustrophobia and the sordidness of medieval England, and the best way to do that is to set it in the middle of a war.

Co-writer Richard Curtis has said that before writing the series, the writers read a number of books about the war and decided that the First World War was a particularly apt subject for a situation comedy, finding that "actually, all the lead up to the first world war was very funny, all the people coming from communities where they'd never bumped into posh people...and all being so gung ho and optimistic...the first hundred pages of any book about the world war are hilarious; then of course everybody dies."

Michael Brooke, assessing the series for the British Film Institute, suggests that the characterisation and pervading sense of danger prevented the sitcom from trivialising its subject matter: "The prospect of its characters suddenly dying a violent death provided a constant source of tension and gags, though when they really were killed off at the end of the final episode...the result was so unexpectedly moving that the programme was later repeated as part of an otherwise wholly serious BBC2 Armistice Day programme without anyone batting an eyelid."

=== Awards ===
The series won the British Academy Television Award for Best Comedy Series in 1989. In addition, for his performance as Captain Blackadder, Rowan Atkinson won Best Light Entertainment Performance. In 2000, the series was placed 16th by industry professionals in a list of the 100 Greatest British Television Programmes compiled by the British Film Institute. In 2004, championed by John Sergeant, the whole Blackadder series came second in the BBC poll to find Britain's Best Sitcom with 282,106 votes.

=== Legacy ===
Journalists and historians have noted that the television series has become a pervasive view of the war in the public's perception of World War I, with Max Hastings calling the common British view of the war "the Blackadder take on history". Military historian Richard Holmes commented in his book The Western Front: "Blackadder's aphorisms have become fact... A well-turned line of script can sometimes carry more weight than all the scholarly footnotes in the world." Stephen Badsey, analysing trends in television programmes about the war, remarked that Blackadder Goes Forth as a popular comedy series was subject to particular criticism from historians, remarking that the series "consciously traded on every cliche and misremembered piece of history about the Western Front, and was influential enough to draw a surprising degree of angry criticism from professional historians as a result."

The series has prompted debate among politicians in the UK. In 2014, it was the subject of a public dispute between Conservative politician Michael Gove, then serving as Secretary of State for Education, and Labour activist Tony Robinson, who portrayed Baldrick, after Gove had written that it presented the war as "a misbegotten shambles – a series of catastrophic mistakes perpetrated by an out-of-touch elite. Even to this day there are left-wing academics all too happy to feed those myths." Robinson responded "to categorise teachers who would introduce something like Blackadder as left-wing and introducing left-wing propaganda is very, very unhelpful. And I think it's particularly unhelpful and irresponsible for a minister in charge of education." Tristram Hunt also criticised Gove's comments, but Andrew Murrison compared the series to Oh, What a Lovely War! as a take on history that had "sadly been in the ascendant for the past 50 years".

Esther MacCallum-Stewart of Sussex University noted in her essay "Television Docu-Drama and The First World War" that "Blackadder Goes Forth is used as a teaching aid in schools; not as a secondary text that should be analysed and discussed for its own reliability, but as a truthful parody of the conditions of the First World War." Broadcaster Jeremy Paxman criticised schools for relying on episodes of Blackadder Goes Forth to teach pupils about the conflict.

== Media releases ==
Blackadder Goes Forth is available on a variety of BBC Worldwide-distributed DVD and VHS video releases, either as an individual series or as part of a boxset with the other series of Blackadder. In addition, a BBC Radio Collection audio version created from the TV soundtrack is available on cassette and CD. All four series and the Christmas special are also available for download on iTunes. The complete scripts of the four television series were released in 1998 as Blackadder: The Whole Damn Dynasty 1485–1917, and later reissued by Penguin Books in 2009.

=== VHS releases ===
VHS video title	Year of release	Episodes
Blackadder Goes Forth – Captain Cook (BBCV 4349)	10 September 1990	"Captain Cook"; "Corporal Punishment"; "Major Star"
Blackadder Goes Forth – Private Plane (BBCV 4350)	10 September 1990	"Private Plane"; "General Hospital"; "Goodbyeee"
The Complete Blackadder Goes Forth (double pack) (BBCV 4787)	7 September 1992	All episodes split over two VHS tapes.: Part 1 – "Captain Cook"; "Corporal Punishment"; "Major Star"; Part 2 – "Private Plane"; "General Hospital"; "Goodbyeee"
Blackadder Goes Forth – The Entire Historic Fourth Series (BBCV 5714)	2 October 1995	All 6 episodes on a single video cassette.: "Captain Cook"; "Corporal Punishment"; "Major Star"; "Private Plane"; "General Hospital"; "Goodbyeee"

=== DVD releases ===
DVD title	DVD Content	Region 1	Region 2	Region 4
Blackadder Goes Forth	Complete fourth series, no extras.	26 June 2001	22 October 2001	28 February 2002
The Complete Blackadder	All four series, no extras.	—N/a	12 November 2001	3 October 2002
Blackadder – The Complete Collection	All four series and specials, no extras.	26 June 2001	3 October 2005	—N/a
Blackadder Remastered – The Ultimate Edition	All four series and specials remastered, plus Blackadder Rides Again documentary, audio commentaries on selected episodes and interviews with cast.	20 October 2009	15 June 2009	1 October 2009

=== LaserDisc release ===
Blackadder Goes Forth was released on a double LaserDisc set by Encore Entertainment in May 1997, with the episodes spread over three of the four sides.
