= The Donkeys =

The Donkeys may refer to:

- The Donkeys (band), an indie band from San Diego, California
  - The Donkeys, their debut album
- The Donkeys (British band), band from the 70's
- Lions led by donkeys
- Led By Donkeys, and anti-Brexit campaign group
