= General Hospital (Blackadder) =

American television soap opera (since 1963)

- Blackadder episode
- Episode no.: Series 4 Episode 5
- Directed by: R. Boden
- Written by: Richard Curtis & Ben Elton
- Original air date: 26 October 1989

Guest appearances
- Miranda Richardson; Bill Wallis

Episode chronology
← Previous "Private Plane"	Next → "Goodbyeee"

"General Hospital", or "Plan E: General Hospital", is the fifth episode of Blackadder Goes Forth, the fourth series of the BBC sitcom Blackadder.

== Plot ==
George and Baldrick are playing "I spy", to Blackadder's great annoyance and boredom. However, the game is interrupted when a bomb lands on their trench, injuring George and sending him to the field hospital. There he meets the sweet-natured Nurse Mary Fletcher-Brown (Miranda Richardson), who helps George write letters to his relatives. Blackadder is ordered to General Melchett's HQ. There, Melchett and Captain Darling explain that there is a German spy in the hospital who has been leaking the British battle plans back to the Kaiser, although Blackadder expresses surprise that the army has battle plans. Melchett gives Blackadder three weeks to root out the spy, and states that if he succeeds he will be made head of a new intelligence network, Operation Winkle (to winkle out the spies). After Blackadder leaves, Darling expresses his mistrust and asks to go along to keep an eye on Blackadder. Melchett agrees and shoots Darling in the foot to give him a cover story.

Blackadder and Baldrick return to the hospital, where Blackadder orders Baldrick to keep an eye on "Mr. Smith", an injured soldier with a thick German accent who shares the ward with George. Darling shows up and, after expressing his lack of confidence in Blackadder's abilities, finds himself tied to a chair under intense interrogation. Mary arrives just as Blackadder releases a humiliated Darling. She reveals that her soppiness is just her bedside manner and that she is smarter and more cynical than Edmund initially suspected; the two enter into a sexual relationship.

Eventually Blackadder's investigation ends and he brings Mary along to HQ to see General Melchett about the intelligence leak which, Melchett explains, has become so bad that the Germans were able to send him a reminder that he was due to change his shirts. Mary says that she suspects Darling because of his "pooh-poohing" of Blackadder – a court-martial offence somewhat similar to insubordination. Mary also voices her suspicion of Smith, but Blackadder dismisses him as too obvious, reasoning that the Germans would never send a man with such an obvious accent. Edmund says that Mary herself is the spy, a fact he verified over their time together (through, among other factors, her proficiency in German and her inquisitions into British tank movements). Baldrick leads Mary away as Melchett picks up the phone to organise a firing squad. "Mr. Smith" enters the room, followed by Darling, who claims Smith is the spy. However, Melchett reveals that the man is a British spy: Brigadier-General Sir Bernard Proudfoot-Smith, the finest spy in the army and the one who tipped Melchett off about the spy in the hospital. Smith explains that his German accent is one he has developed due to his time undercover in Germany. Melchett rewards Blackadder by making him the head of Operation Winkle, denounces Darling as a "complete arse," and he and Smith leave to watch Mary's execution. George enters the room and unwittingly reveals himself as the leak when he remarks that the relative he has been writing to is, in fact, his uncle Hermann in Munich. Darling smugly confronts Blackadder, and the two race out of the room to inform Melchett.
