= No Way =

No Way may refer to:

== Albums ==
- No Way (album), by Run On, 1997
- No Way!, or the title track, by Boogaloo Joe Jones, 1971
- No Way, by Geraldine Hunt, 1980

== Songs ==
- "No Way" (Rottyful Sky song), 2010
- "No Way" (Soulhead song), 2004
- "No Way!", by Bazzi from Soul Searching, 2019
- "No Way", by Bob Girls, 2014
- "No Way", by the Cynics, 1987
- "No Way", by David Gilmour from David Gilmour, 1978
- "No Way", by the Donkeys, 1980
- "No Way", by Fifth Harmony from 7/27, 2016
- "No Way", by Humble Pie from Thunderbox, 1974
- "No Way", by Korn from Issues, 1999
- "No Way", by Krokus from Metal Rendez-Vous, 1980
- "No Way", by L3 and XO-IQ, featured in the television series Make It Pop
- "No Way", by Lee Hi from 24°C, 2019
- "No Way", by Nina Hagen Band from Unbehagen, 1980
- "No Way", by Pearl Jam from Yield, 1998
- "No Way", by Sonic Youth from The Eternal, 2009
- "No Way", by Toni Braxton from Pulse, 2010
- "No Way", from the musical Six

== See also ==
- "No Way, No Way", a song by Vanilla, 1997
