= Corporal Punishment (Blackadder) =

- Blackadder episode
- Episode no.: Series 4 Episode 2
- Directed by: Richard Boden
- Written by: Ben Elton; Richard Curtis
- Original air date: 5 October 1989

Guest appearances
- Stephen Frost, Lee Cornes, Paul Mark Elliott, Jeremy Gittins, Jeremy Hardy

Episode chronology
← Previous "Captain Cook"	Next → "Major Star"

"Corporal Punishment" or "Plan B: Corporal Punishment", is the second episode of Blackadder Goes Forth, the fourth series of the BBC sitcom Blackadder. It was first broadcast on BBC1 on 5 October 1989. In the episode, Blackadder faces a court-martial, and later an execution by firing squad, for shooting a carrier pigeon.

== Plot ==
Captain Blackadder receives numerous calls from the wrong number before finally getting a call from Captain Darling with orders to advance. He avoids going over the top by pretending the line is breaking up. He then throws away a telegram ordering him to advance because it is wrongly addressed to "Catpain Blackudder", and then shoots a carrier pigeon relaying the same message. Upon inspection of the pigeon's partly charred message, however, it turns out that shooting carrier pigeons has become an offense under military law and Blackadder decides to destroy the evidence by cooking and eating the pigeon for his lunch. When General Melchett arrives at the trenches demanding an explanation as to why the group has not advanced, Blackadder nearly gets away with it by blaming the communication breakdown. However, Private Baldrick and Lieutenant George unintentionally reveal what Blackadder has done (as having been told not to answer any questions on the incident, when asked unrelated questions, they reply, "We didn't receive any messages, and Captain Blackadder definitely did not shoot this delicious plump-breasted pigeon").

Pigeon feathers are noticed on the floor, which Darling and Melchett believe to be white. But after Baldrick points out that the feathers are "speckly," Melchett is enraged, as it was his beloved pet pigeon, Speckled Jim. He tries to strike Blackadder but is physically restrained by Darling, who informs Blackadder that he is under arrest and, if found guilty at court-martial, he will face execution by firing squad.

Blackadder sends for Sir Bob Massingbird (originally scripted as "Robert Moxon Browne", a real-life lawyer and friend of Rowan Atkinson's, until this was judged to be technically advertising), a brilliant lawyer sure to get him acquitted. Massingbird's previous cases included convincing a jury that a man who had a bloody knife in front of a dead man, who was seen stabbing the man in front of 13 people and said "I'm glad I killed the bastard" was innocent, and that Oscar Wilde was a homosexual despite incredible notoriety as a womaniser. However, the letters are mixed up thanks to Baldrick, and George turns up as Blackadder's defence. On the day of the court-martial, Blackadder is relieved to know that Darling is the prosecuting counsel but mortified to learn that Melchett is the judge. Melchett summarily fines George £50 for wasting the court's time by turning up, takes great pains to locate his black cap, and refers to Blackadder as "the Flanders Pigeon Murderer". George puts paid to any remaining hopes with his poor choice of witnesses: Darling, who provides more evidence against Blackadder with George even pointing out what bits he missed, and Baldrick, who takes Blackadder's order to deny everything literally and denies everything, even his name. When George is giving the summation for the defence, he accidentally says Blackadder is guilty of the crime rather than "trying to do his duty under difficult circumstances", although he does correct this error but to no avail. Darling's case for the prosecution involves calling Melchett to the witness stand and inciting him against Blackadder, after which Melchett sentences Blackadder to death by firing squad without consulting the jury.

Back in his cell Blackadder receives an escape kit from Baldrick that fully caters to unlikely situations but lacks the essential tools to actually attempt an escape. He is visited by his friendly firing squad, with whom he trades vicious banter. Another mix-up results in Baldrick delivering a telegram for George's mother to Blackadder, but this provides Blackadder with a way out when he discovers that George's mad uncle Rupert has just been made Minister of War and can get Blackadder acquitted. When Baldrick eventually remembers to tell George this after confusion as to which person in the letter can help Blackadder, they decide to celebrate by drinking some Scotch that George's mother sent him – and get so drunk that they pass out before remembering to send a telegram. Blackadder turns up to the execution grounds optimistic but gets worried when he hears a telegram has not yet arrived. The gaoler stops the firing squad as a telegram does arrive just after the Corporal says "Aim!" However, it turns out to be from one of the members of the firing squad saying, "Here's looking at you, love from all the boys in the firing squad." The Squad then resumes. In the end, though, Rupert sends a telegram anyway after reading about Blackadder's case in the despatches, believing that Melchett made a mistake and knowing that Blackadder is a close friend of his nephew's. However, Blackadder reads another of George's telegrams and discovers that they did not send it themselves. Out of revenge, Blackadder volunteers Baldrick and George for the mission that Captain Darling calls him about – "Operation Certain-Death"- a mission into No-Man's Land.
