= There's No Way =

There's No Way may refer to

- "There's No Way" (Alabama song), 1985
- "There's No Way" (Lauv song), featuring Julia Michaels, 2018

== See also ==
- No Way (disambiguation)
