= Corporal punishment (disambiguation) =

Corporal punishment refers to causing physical pain as a form of punishment.

Corporal Punishment may also refer to:

- "Corporal Punishment" (Blackadder), an episode of Blackadder Goes Forth
- "Corporal Punishment" (NCIS), an episode of NCIS
- Corporal Punishment (wrestler), American professional wrestler
- Corporal Punishment (The Simpsons), a fictional character on The Simpsons
