= Private Plane =

- Blackadder episode
- Episode no.: Series 4 Episode 4
- Written by: Ben Elton; Richard Curtis
- Original air date: 19 October 1989

Guest appearances
- Gabrielle Glaister; Rik Mayall; Adrian Edmondson; Hugo Blick

Episode chronology
← Previous "Major Star"	Next → "General Hospital"

"Private Plane", or "Plan D: Private Plane", is the fourth episode of Blackadder Goes Forth, the fourth series of the BBC sitcom Blackadder.

== Plot ==
The episode begins with an ongoing artillery attack that is disturbing Blackadder's rest, an attack which Blackadder says is futile as "Jerry is safe underground". Shortly after it stops, an air raid begins. Believing it to be a German raid, Blackadder leaves an angry message for the head of the Royal Flying Corps ("Message reads 'Where are you, you bastards?'"), but is not thrilled to learn that it was simply a display by the Flying Corps. Shortly afterwards, the brash and egocentric Squadron Commander Lord Flashheart crash lands in the trench and punches Blackadder, believing him to be a "Boche". Baldrick and George are enraptured by Flashheart, though Blackadder is completely unimpressed, viewing Flashheart as a "prat". As Flashheart leaves with Bob, he offers George a place in the Flying Corps. Initially uninterested, Blackadder is more agreeable when he learns of the "Twenty Minuters" squadron, so named because new pilots only spend twenty minutes in the air.

At Staff HQ, Blackadder tries to join the Flying Corps; Captain Darling tries to stop him, but General Melchett allows the transfer. At basic training the next day, Blackadder learns that the flight instructor is Flashheart, and that the actual reason for the name "Twenty Minuters" is because the twenty minutes is the life expectancy of a new pilot. Darling at this point assures Blackadder that he will be fine as long as he has a good navigator. However, much to Darling's glee, the navigator is Baldrick.

Shortly after takeoff, both Blackadder and Baldrick are shot down by a German plane and captured by Baron von Richthofen, who wants to learn the subtleties of British humour. He informs them of their fate, which entails teaching home economics to young German girls in a convent outside Heidelberg, which the Baron thinks will be a "fate worse than death to a British soldier"; Blackadder feigns sorrow, but he is, of course, overjoyed.

George, in the meantime, attempts to rescue Blackadder with the help of Darling and Melchett, but is informed that it would be "pointless". He is shown a life size model of the land they have recaptured, measuring seventeen square feet. He is more successful in recruiting Lord Flashheart, who swiftly rescues Blackadder and Baldrick. Blackadder tries to stall them claiming he has "splintered [his] pancreas", but Flashheart is not fooled and forces Blackadder out the door. At that moment, Richthofen appears and confronts Flashheart, comparing the nobility and majesty of their calling. In response, Flashheart shoots von Richthofen and calls him a "poof".

Back at HQ, Blackadder confronts the cowardly Darling who as he steps backwards finds that Flashheart is standing behind him. Flashheart then headbutts Darling into unconsciousness onto his desk to get back at him for not rescuing them sooner. He then leaves, advising Blackadder "If you want something, take it" (a principle he demonstrates with Bob). Melchett appears, at which point Blackadder asks for some time off to recuperate. Melchett agrees, stating that Blackadder's commanding officer would have to be "stark raving mad" to refuse. However, when Blackadder reminds Melchett that he is Blackadder's commanding officer and asks if he can have a week's leave to recuperate, Melchett replies "Certainly not", refusing Blackadder's request.
