= Rottyful Sky =

South Korean singer (1988–2013)

- Rottyful Sky in June 2013
- Born: Kim Hanul; March 22, 1988; South Korea
- Died: October 8, 2013 (aged 25); Seoul, South Korea
- Other names: Hanul (하늘; Sky)
- Occupations: Singer, actress
- Agent: RS Company
- Height: 167 cm (5 ft 6 in)

Korean name
- Hangul: 김하늘
- RR: Gim Haneul
- MR: Kim Hanŭl

Kim Hanul (Korean: 김하늘; March 22, 1988 – October 8, 2013), better known by her stage name Rottyful Sky (로티플스카이), formerly known as Hanul, was a South Korean singer and producer.

== Career ==
=== Solo career and further singles (2001–2006) ===
She debuted in 2001 with the album Voice of Purity under the stage name "Sky." She was 14 years old at the time under East Asian age reckoning.

In 2006 she announced she would join the Hip-Hop Dance group Roo'ra, although she withdrew in 2007 before releasing any new material. The announcement was made at the same time as Roo'ra's announcement of their comeback with a 'best of' album, hence she is credited on the album although she didn't participate on it.

In 2009 she joined the group MADmoiselle, which released one digital single before disbanding.

=== Stage name change, No Way and Get Away (2010—2013) ===
Nine years after her debut, in 2010, she made her comeback as a solo artist, under the stage name Rottyful Sky, with the release of the digital single "No Way". At that time, she became the first singer to be produced by actor-singer Ryu Si-won. On June 24, 2010, Sony MUSIC launch the first Korean video of "No way" in 3D. On February 12, 2013, she released a second digital single "Get Away".

== Health and death ==
On October 8, 2013, she died at the age of 25 after struggling with a brain tumor.

== Discography ==
=== Albums ===
- [2001.08.16] Voice of Purity (Hanul)

=== Digital Singles ===
- [2010.07.22] "No Way"
- [2011.03.04] Midas OST Part.4 (마이더스)
- [2013.02.12] "Get Away"

=== Collaboration/Others ===
- [2007.09.05] House Rulez – Mojito (#3 Mojito (feat. Hanul))
- [2008.06.20] My-Q – This Is for You (#4 Yeoreum Haneul (feat. Hanul))
- [2008.09.24] Listen Campaign (#4 Save My Heart)
- [2008.11.18] Ignite – Ignite Spot (1st Single Album) (#2 Good Memories (feat. Hanul))
- [2009.06.16] Ignite – Look So Good (#10 Good Memories (feat. Hanul) (Full Version))
- [2009.08.28] Style OST (#1 Tell Me (JP, Hanul), No. 5 Eojjeoda Neoreul, No. 17 Tell Me (Hanul Version))
- [2011.07.14] BIG BANG (singer)|BIG BANG – BIG BANG 2+1 (#1 2+1 (feat. Hanul))
- [2011.07.29] Scent of a Woman OST Part.1 – (#2 Bluebird)

== Filmography ==
=== Dramas ===
- [2011] Manny (EP5)
