= Captain Cook (Blackadder) =

- Blackadder episode
- Episode no.: Series 4 Episode 1
- Directed by: Richard Boden
- Written by: Ben Elton, Richard Curtis
- Original air date: 28 September 1989

Episode chronology
← Previous "Duel and Duality"	Next → "Corporal Punishment"

"Captain Cook", or "Plan A: Captain Cook", is the first episode of Blackadder Goes Forth, the fourth series of the BBC sitcom Blackadder. It was first broadcast in 1989.

In 2014, Blackadder Goes Forth – Captain Cook was performed as a play by Kegworth Players Youth Arts and the Seagull Rep in Lowestoft.

== Plot ==
Lt. George enters Captain Blackadder's dugout and provides him with a copy of the propaganda magazine King and Country, and a new service revolver. Blackadder deduces from these ominous signs that an advance against the Germans is imminent, one which they will probably not survive. Baldrick suggests that they take up cooking at HQ to get out of the advance, but Blackadder shoots down the idea, highlighting Baldrick's extremely poor cooking skills: among other delicacies, Baldrick's "cream custard" is actually cat's vomit.

Shortly afterwards, Blackadder is called to the office of General Melchett for a special mission to help boost the soldiers' morale. Melchett tells Blackadder that they need new inspiring artwork for the front cover of King and Country. Blackadder is uninterested until he learns that the artist needs to leave the trenches for Paris. Blackadder and Baldrick work on their own paintings. When George reveals he can paint surprisingly well, Blackadder gets him to paint a picture of a British soldier (resembling Blackadder) standing next to the body of a dead nun in a ruined French village. When Melchett and Captain Darling arrive to inspect their work, Blackadder passes off his own painting as George's, and claims credit for George's painting. Melchett and Darling reject Blackadder and Baldrick's paintings, but accept George's painting. Melchett appoints Blackadder as their official war artist.

At HQ, Melchett then reveals that the King and Country cover story was just a ploy: instead of Paris, the chosen artist will in fact go into No-Man's Land and draw the enemy positions. After Blackadder, Baldrick and George are caught amidst enemy fire, Blackadder urges George to paint from his own imagination. Blackadder returns with a sketch illustrating immense, but fictional, enemy defensive capabilities, including a large number of elephants. He and Darling suggest that the push should be cancelled. Melchett orders the advance, believing that the enemy would expect the push to be cancelled. Blackadder, George and Baldrick avoid the push by dressing up as Italian chefs and substituting themselves for Melchett's chef. After the trio serve Baldrick's vile cuisine to Melchett and Darling, they escape back to the trenches, where Blackadder asks Baldrick how he managed "to get so much custard out of such a small cat".

== Quote ==
A popular quote from the "Captain Cook" episode is as follows:

George: Oh, sir, just one thing ... If we should happen to tread on a mine, what should we do? Blackadder: Well, normal procedure, Lieutenant, is to jump two hundred feet into the air and scatter oneself over a wide area.
