= Gabrielle Glaister =

English actress

- Born: 27 July 1960 (age 65); Moreton-in-Marsh, Gloucestershire, England
- Occupation: Actress

Gabrielle Glaister (born 27 July 1960) is an English actress. She played Patricia Farnham in British soap opera Brookside and Trish Wallace in Family Affairs. She also played Bob/Kate/Bobbie Parkhurst in several episodes of Blackadder.

== Career ==
Glaister appeared in the title role in a stage production of Oliver Twist, alongside Ben Elton as the Artful Dodger. In 1983, she returned to the stage in Denise Deegan's comedy play Daisy Pulls It Off.

Glaister's first television roles were in 1983 in Jury and Jane Eyre. Her first notable television roles were three appearances as "Bob" in the 1980s Blackadder series and the part of Patricia Farnham, the long-suffering partner of Max Farnham (Steven Pinder), in Brookside from 1990 until 1996.

Glaister returned to soap acting in 2000 when she appeared in Coronation Street as Debs Brownlow, the sister of Natalie Horrocks, played by Denise Welch. Her next soap role was in Channel 5 soap Family Affairs from September 2004 playing Trish Wallace until September 2005. In 2019, Glaister took the role of Hilary Benshaw in Emmerdale, playing rival to Nicola King as they both vied to be elected as a local councillor. She later re-appeared in Coronation Street as Fern Lindon from August - November 2022.

== Filmography ==
=== Television ===
Year	Title	Role	Notes
1983	Jane Eyre	Amy Eshton	2 episodes
1983	Jury	Jane	Episode: "Andrew"
1984	Mitch	Julie	Episode: "Nature of the Beast"
1986	Blackadder II	Kate/Bob	Episode: "Bells"
1986	All at No 20	Carol	6 episodes
1988	Grange Hill	Mother	1 episode
1988	The Franchise Affair	Frances Chadwick	1 episode
1988	Rockliffe's Babies	WPC Tillet	2 episodes
1988	Wish Me Luck	Felicity	2 episodes
1988, 2003, 2010	Casualty	Beverly Jason (1988); Christina Ford (2003); Trish Hallows (2010)	3 episodes
1989	Blackadder Goes Forth	Driver Parkhurst	Episodes: "Major Star", "Private Plane"
1989	London's Burning	TV Reporter	1 episode
1990	The Man from Auntie	Various	2 episodes
1990–1996	Brookside	Patricia Farnham	547 episodes
1997	Gayle's World	Guest	4 episodes
1997	Get Well Soon	Doctor Ruggles	1 episode
2000, 2022	Coronation Street	Debs Brownlow (2000); Fern Lindon (2022)	
2001	Peak Practice	Hazel Myers	1 episode
2001-2020	Doctors	Vicki Armstrong; Elaine Marshall; Josie Carlton; Elaine Patrick; Kath Hill; Aileen Godolphin; Martha Taile	
2004-2005	Family Affairs	Trish Wallace	
2009	Law & Order: UK	Liz Wakeman	1 episode
2010	The Bill	Jenny Marton	1 episode
2012	New Tricks	Sarah Maitland	1 episode
2012	Crime Stores	Sonia Stapleton	1 episode
2013	Sadie J	Dr. Valdis Viazani	1 episode
2014	The Dumping Ground	Sian	1 episode
2016	Upstart Crow	Judge Robert	1 episode
2017	Sherlock	Ambassador	"The Six Thatchers"
2018	Unforgotten	Alison Pinion	3 episodes
2018	Midsomer Murders	Juliet Evans	1 episode
2019	Emmerdale	Hilary Benshaw	8 episodes
2019	Dark Money	Cordelia	TV Mini-series, 1 episode
2019	Cleaning Up	Mrs. Evans	2 episodes
2020	Silent Witness	Donna Collyer	2 episodes
2021	Grantchester	Sophie Hastings	1 episode
2024	Trigger Point	Martina Wyatt	1 episode
2024	Death in Paradise	Cora Blyth	1 episode

=== Film ===
Year	Title	Role
1991	Buddy's Song	Anthea
1997	The Heart Surgeon	Paula Shears
2018	Tango One	Chapman

=== Theatre ===
- Daisy Pulls It Off
- Elton John's Glasses by David Farr
- Insignificance by Terry Johnson
