= No Way (Rottyful Sky song) =

Single by Rottyful Sky
- Released: 22 July 2010
- Recorded: 2010
- Genre: K-pop
- Length: 10:04
- Label: RS Company
- Songwriter(s): Rottyful Sky
- Producer(s): Rottyful Sky, RS Company

Rottyful Sky singles chronology
"Voice of Purity" (2010)	"No Way" (2010)	"Get Away" (2013)

"No Way" is the first single album by Korean artist Rottyful Sky, previously known as Hanul. It is her first digital single released, following a nine-year hiatus. On 21 July 2010, a 3D music video was released. Directed by Lee Sa-gang, the video was part of Sony Korea-sponsored project, which was held at the Megabox Theater in the COEX Mall in Seoul, South Korea. The song charted on the South Korean national Gaon Weekly and Monthly Download Charts, which ranks best-selling non-physical, digital music sales. "No Way" peaked on the charts at No. 88.

== Track listing ==
No.	Title	Writer(s)	Length
1.	"No Way"	Rottyful Sky	3:48
2.	"No Way (Instrumental)"		3:48
3.	"My House"	Rottyful Sky	3:08
Total length:			10:45

== Sales chart ==
Chart	Download	Weekly position
Gaon Weekly Digital Charts (1 August 2010 – 7 August 2010)	1,011,649	186
Gaon Weekly Digital Charts (25 July 2010 – 31 July 2010)	2,377,972	103
Gaon Weekly Download Charts (1 August 2010 – 7 August 2010)	-	88
Gaon Weekly Download Charts (8 August 2010 – 14 August 2010)	-	176
Gaon Monthly Download Charts (July)	-	196

== Release history ==
Country	Date	Format	Label
South Korea	22 July 2010	digital download (via Mnet)	RS Company
US	1 July 2012	digital download (via iTunes)	RS Company
Japan	1 July 2012	digital download (via iTunes)	RS Company
US	1 July 2012	digital download (via Amazon.com)	RS Company

== Video ==
Song	Release date
"No Way"	21 July 2010

== Media appearances ==
Interviews

- 6 August 2010: Now TV interview
- 19 August 2010: Radio interview

Music

- 22 July 2010: M!Countdown
- 24 July 2010: Love Power Music
- 25 July 2010: Inkigayo
- 31 July 2010: Music Core
- 1 August 2010: Inkigayo
- 6 August 2010: Music Bank
- 8 August 2010: M-Wave (EP15)
- 9 August 2010: tvN
- 11 August 2010: M!Countdown
- 12 August 2010: M!Countdown
- 15 August 2010: M-Wave (EP16)
- 18 August 2010: M!Countdown
- 22 August 2010: M-Wave (EP17)
- 23 August 2010: tvN Newton
- 11 September 2010: Music Core
- 19 September 2010: M-Wave (EP21)
