= Major Star =

- Blackadder episode
- Episode no.: Series 4 Episode 3
- Written by: Ben Elton, Richard Curtis
- Original air date: 12 October 1989

Guest appearance
- Gabrielle Glaister

Episode chronology
← Previous "Corporal Punishment"	Next → "Private Plane"

"Major Star", or "Plan C: Major Star", is the third episode of Blackadder Goes Forth, the fourth series of the BBC sitcom Blackadder. It originally aired on 12 October 1989.

The episode was brought to the stage in 2012 by theatre companies including the Chelmsford Theatre Workshop.

== Plot ==
As the Russian Revolution begins and the Russians exit the First World War, Blackadder plans to desert the British Army. However, General Melchett asks Blackadder to organise a cabaret to boost the soldiers' morale, which will soon be going to the London Palladium for the duration of the war. Blackadder takes the job without revealing his dislike of Charlie Chaplin and music hall, which would run contrary to Melchett's expectations of his suitability. Melchett brings along his driver, Bob Parkhurst, to stay with Blackadder and his men. Blackadder immediately notices that "Bob" is a woman in disguise; however, Bob persuades Blackadder not to reveal the truth.

Baldrick decides to impersonate Chaplin during the show, using a dead slug for a mustache, while George performs in drag as "Gorgeous Georgina". The drag act proves to be the show's highlight. Melchett falls in love with Georgina, and tells Blackadder that he wants to take Georgina to the Regimental Ball. Blackadder convinces George to go along with the plan and avoid revealing his true identity. Later, George tells Blackadder about his date with Melchett. Blackadder panics when George reveals that Melchett wants to marry him.

At staff HQ, Blackadder informs Melchett that Georgina was killed after she accidentally stepped on a cluster of landmines. Blackadder must now find a replacement for George. Baldrick, who supports the Russian Revolution, offers to marry Melchett for wealth as "the other woman" to disrupt the aristocracy. Blackadder decides to ask Bob to be the show's new leading lady. Although Bob is popular with the audience, Melchett criticizes the show, singling out Bob's performance while mistaking her for a drag act. Melchett and Darling cancel all future shows, preventing Blackadder and his performers from going to London. Blackadder learns that the Americans have now joined the war and have brought a cache of Chaplin films with them. Darling reads a telegram from Chaplin himself requesting that Blackadder serve as projectionist during the screenings, much to Blackadder's dismay.
