= The Western Front (book) =

History book by Richard Holmes published in 2000

The Western Front is a 2000 book by Richard Holmes about the western front of the First World War. Kirkus Reviews called it a "concise, balanced study".
