= Baldrick =

Fictional character from Blackadder

- Blackadder character
- Baldrick, portrayed by Sir Tony Robinson, in all four series of Blackadder
- First appearance: "The Foretelling" (1983)
- Last appearance: Blackadder: Back and Forth (2000)
- Created by: Richard Curtis
- Portrayed by: Tony Robinson; Philip Fox (pilot)

In-universe information
- Gender: Male
- Occupation: Squire, Bachelor of the Parish of Chigwell (The Black Adder); Bondsman (Blackadder II); Dogsbody, Nobleman, Member of Parliament (Blackadder the Third); Private, Batman (Blackadder Goes Forth); Septic Tank cleaner, Prime Minister of the United Kingdom (Blackadder: Back and Forth)
- Nationality: English

Baldrick is the name of several fictional characters featured in the long-running BBC historic comedy television series Blackadder. Each one serves as Edmund Blackadder's servant and sidekick and acts as a foil and arguably the best friend of the lead character (even though Blackadder is often shown to barely tolerate Baldrick's presence). Each series of Blackadder is set in a different period in British history, and each Baldrick character (as with the character of Edmund) is a descendant of the Baldrick from the preceding series. Just as Blackadder exists in many incarnations throughout the ages, so does Baldrick; whenever there is a Blackadder there is a Baldrick serving him. They are all portrayed by Sir Tony Robinson (although in the pilot episode, unaired until 2023, he was played by Philip Fox).

The relationship between Edmund and Baldrick evolves significantly; in the first series of the show, Baldrick is more intelligent than Blackadder, but this dynamic is reversed in subsequent series, with Baldrick's intelligence decreasing as the show continued. He is the only character other than Edmund Blackadder to appear in every episode of the programme.

'Baldrick' is a rare personal and family name. It is Germanic in origin, and has been present in Britain since the Norman Conquest of 1066.

== Character ==
The character of Baldrick has become popularly associated with the comedic catch phrase "I have a cunning plan." The "cunning plans" in question are dreamed up by Baldrick as a solution to a particular problem or crisis and are usually ridiculed scathingly by Blackadder for their implausibility, but Blackadder frequently resorts to using these plans when the situation becomes desperate.

Although Baldrick's main goal is mostly very hidden, with a clever eye it is seen that he makes several attempts throughout history to raise his social standing, similar to Blackadder although the latter had much more success.

- In the first series, Baldrick (a servant in the castle and a dung gatherer at the time) managed to gain favour with Lord Edmund Plantagenet by claiming he witnessed the King giving Edmund a special greeting (sarcastically). Edmund, impressed with Baldrick "admiring" him, appointed him his squire in the Battle of Bosworth Field. Later, when Richard III was killed (by Edmund), Baldrick helped him cover it up and managed to remain in Edmund's service after he became a prince. Throughout the first series, Baldrick always assists Edmund and keeps him in the illusion that he is admired until the last episode where Baldrick gets fired and, due to having worked for years to even get into the castle, goes to very low jobs. After Edmund left, he cried (either for losing his status or for actual attachment to the Prince). Baldrick managed to do one last thing for the Prince and, with Lord Percy Percy's assistance, killed the Black Seal (the six most evil men in England plus Blackadder's archenemy). Percy accidentally also poisoned the royal family and Edmund. It is unknown what happened to him.
- In the second series, Baldrick's attempts to raise his social status bring much lower results due to his much smaller intelligence. His most visible attempt is in the first episode, where he tries to marry Lord Edmund Blackadder as his bridesmaid (after Kate eloped). Baldrick still has enough intelligence left to admire Blackadder and clearly has a desire to please him. Nevertheless, Edmund despises Baldrick and even fires him once. This great obstacle was removed for a short period of time when Edmund was kidnapped by Prince Ludwig the Indestructible along with Lord Melchett, so that Baldrick was able to get into the royal court by becoming the Queen's personal pet. A few hours later, he was murdered by Prince Ludwig along with Blackadder, Melchett, Queenie, Nursie, and Lord Percy.
- In the third series, S. Baldrick has lost almost all intelligence and apparently has no desire to rise in social standing; in the first episode, he claims that his goal in life is the acquisition of turnips. Ironically, in the same episode, Baldrick is appointed to the House of Lords by Prince George and thus becomes upper class, one of the greatest achievements of the Baldrick family. He also haggles for a priceless turnip (£400,000). Baldrick's turnip is crushed by Blackadder later, and presumably, his titles are erased as in the following episodes he is once more lower class.
- In the fourth series, Private S. Baldrick's intelligence has slightly risen again, enough that he desires a rise in social status. He attempts to gain social status in the third episode by marrying General Melchett. This, of course, does not succeed. He is also more aware of the classes than previous Baldricks (and is apparently a supporter of the Russian Revolution), presumably the October Revolution led by Vladimir Lenin and the Bolsheviks, and is angry when Blackadder hits him several times (other Baldricks never complain).
- In the Millennium special, S. Baldrick constructs a fake time machine from Leonardo da Vinci's sketches, despite his inability to read (combatting this with his experience of constructing Airfix models). Baldrick's intelligence has risen to the level of the second Baldrick again and he accidentally makes a time machine. After a time-travel adventure, Lord Blackadder finds England an extension of France, William Shakespeare, having designed the ballpoint pen and no knowledge of Robin Hood whatsoever. Edmund takes all the things he gained on his journey (besides Elizabeth I's Crown) and, after another adventure, gets the idea to alter the timeline to become King. Predictably, Baldrick becomes his Prime Minister, finally becoming what he desired (as did Edmund), and is the second Baldrick to rise to upper class (although after Blackadder's alterations there may be more).

The catchphrase "I have a cunning plan" made its first appearance in the pilot episode, but it is not regularly used until the third series; Blackadder had mentioned the phrase twice in the first series and Baldrick once. Baldrick had also claimed to have "a plan" in a "cunning" voice on one occasion in ' Blackadder II'. In the final episode of the last series, Blackadder Goes Forth, Baldrick announces that he has a cunning plan to save the main characters from "going over the top", although it is never revealed what this plan might be (other than that it is "as cunning as a fox who's just been appointed Professor of Cunning at Oxford University"). Blackadder, perhaps realising he cannot postpone going into battle (and certain death) indefinitely, dismisses it, telling Baldrick "Whatever it was, I'm sure it was better than my plan to get out of here by pretending to be mad. I mean, who would have noticed another madman around here?".

A persistent feature among the Baldricks is their lack of sexual preference, which is often played upon for comic effect. Although Baldrick likes women, he sometimes ends up having encounters with other men, such as a sailor in "Money" (Blackadder II) in exchange for sixpence and Will Scarlet (Blackadder: Back & Forth). He also expresses interest in marrying male characters to increase his social status, such as Blackadder in "Bells", Prince George in "Amy and Amiability" (Blackadder the Third) and General Melchett in "Major Star" (Blackadder Goes Forth). Nonetheless, Baldrick also shows a degree of attraction to women, shown in his conversation with a prostitute in "Money", and in "Amy and Amiability", when he expresses disappointment upon receiving a perfunctory kiss from Blackadder (instead of the voluptuous Lady Sarah Cheapside). Each Baldrick, at various points over the four series, is also willing—and at times eager—to indulge in crossdressing.

The only trait that is actually shared by all Baldricks is complete lack of hygiene and always having filthy, shaggy clothing. All Baldricks also have a different hat in the series (the first one has a Phrygian cap, the second has a Tudor bonnet, the third has a tricorne hat and the fourth has a Lenin-inspired trench cap). Some Baldricks are also fascinated with turnips, although mainly the third one. The second Baldrick mainly cooked it for dinner and while also finding an amusingly shaped turnip funny, while the fourth was in a "Turnip Street Workhouse". However, only the third Baldrick had no other goal in life but the acquisition of turnips. Baldrick proves more intelligent than Blackadder's other companions—such as Lord Percy Percy or George—although only slightly. He is, however, often accorded more cruelty and mistreatment than he deserves.

== Character development ==
=== Pilot episode ===
In 1982, prior to the first Black Adder series, a pilot episode was filmed which featured a number of characters who were later included in the first series. The episode, which was not televised until 2023, included an early version of the Baldrick character, played by Philip Fox, who is portrayed as slightly stupid in contrast to the intelligent, scheming Prince Edmund. Following this pilot, the writers decided to reverse this relationship when the first televised series was produced, so that Baldrick was the clever foil to the idiotic Edmund. In 2010, The Guardian reflected on this change in characterisation, suggesting that it had been a poor decision and commenting that it was "an interesting example of getting it right first time":

=== The Black Adder ===
The medieval Baldrick was probably the only Baldrick of the four who could really be described as clever. Baldrick, an ex-dung shoveller (a respected position, which he had worked very hard to get – earlier jobs include milking pigs and mucking out lepers) and Son of Robin the Dung Gatherer, first met Prince Edmund at the feast before the Battle of Bosworth Field and using flattery became his Squire. The two, along with Lord Percy, toasted their new friendship, unaware that from that point onwards, their descendants' lives would be eternally entwined.

Although cleverer than the Prince, Baldrick, knowing his place in the medieval pecking-order, holds him in awe. He often leads cheers in the Prince's honour (along with Lord Percy, who tries hard to join in), fills his head with illusions of grandeur, and often ends up doing his dirty work. This included carrying the decapitated body of Richard III and sleeping with the Spanish Infanta, Edmund's fiancée, making her unchaste in hopes that this would prevent the marriage. The latter task resulted in several injuries, including a seriously blackened eye. When Baldrick is abandoned by Edmund in the final episode, a tear falls from his eye.

This Baldrick also has cunning plans that, contrary to most of those of his descendants, mostly work. For instance, when Edmund seeks to kill Dougal McAngus, Baldrick suggests that he gets a cannon, takes McAngus outside, makes him stick his head down the cannon and then blow it off. Edmund scoffs at this, and instead tries to kill McAngus using several different "cunning plans" of his own. After having failed miserably with all of these, he resorts to using Baldrick's original plan, which works.

It is Baldrick who suggests the title "The Black Adder" for Prince Edmund, which his descendants later adopt as a surname.

This Baldrick survived the last episode as he and Lord Percy had poisoned the wine to stop the Black Seal. But Percy poisoned the whole batch, killing the king, the queen, Prince Harry, the entire court and Edmund. He and Percy tried to stop them but they were too late, running in after the credits when everybody was already dead.

The "clever" Baldrick character was abandoned after the first series, becoming steadily more foolish with each incarnation.

=== Blackadder II ===
The Elizabethan Baldrick is the servant and bondsman to Lord Blackadder. He has been in Blackadder's family since 1532, when he was two years old. He has a bedroom in Blackadder's house, but has also been forced to sleep in the gutter and on the roof. He has a tendency to eat dung. While his master treats him with utter contempt, he remains intensely loyal.

This Baldrick is considerably less intelligent than his medieval ancestor, although not as dim as future Baldricks. A kindly soul, Baldrick's lack of formal education is compensated for by his basic streetwise cunning. While his "cunning plans" do sometimes have a strange, twisted and often perverse logic and cunning to them, he is nevertheless incredibly stupid. For example, in the episode "Head", Blackadder attempts to teach Baldrick how to add, asking if he had "two beans, and I add two more beans, what does that make?" Baldrick replies, "Some beans", "Three beans... and that one", and "a very small casserole".

Baldrick loves turnips, a trait that would also be present in his descendants. In the episode "Beer", where he and Percy famously discover a turnip shaped like a "thingy". Baldrick is particularly delighted by the discovery, because it contrasts with his own "thingy" which is shaped like a turnip. In the same episode Baldrick reveals his recipe for "Turnip Surprise" – "the surprise is: there's nothing in it except the turnip".

=== Blackadder: The Cavalier Years ===
Baldrick (possibly died 1649) is servant to Sir Edmund Blackadder. Like his Elizabethan ancestor, he moonlights as an executioner, although in his case it is part of a cunning plan to save the life of Charles I of England by replacing his head with a pumpkin. His plan fails. When Blackadder is about to be captured he quickly disguises himself as a Roundhead and leaves Baldrick to be killed instead. He is the son of a pig farmer and a bearded lady.

=== Blackadder the Third ===
The Baldrick of Regency Britain works as an "underscrogsman" (apprentice dogsbody) to Mr. E. Blackadder Esq., butler to Prince George. He lives in a pipe in the upstairs water closet of the Palace.

The third Baldrick is much more noticeably crude and unintelligent than those previous to him and maybe even the stupidest of all four Baldricks. Like his Elizabethan ancestor, he is known to eat dung occasionally. He is also more childlike; when asked if he has any distinguishing features, referring to his nose he asserts, "I've got this huge growth in the middle of my face." There is not the slightest sign of "cunning" in any of his plans, which include:

- escaping the guillotine by waiting until your head has been cut off, then "springing into action" and running "around and around the farmyard, and out the farmyard gate", in the style of a chicken, and
- replacing the burnt first copy of Samuel Johnson's dictionary by taking the string, which has been salvaged, and putting in some new pages. Blackadder clarifies that Baldrick is suggesting that he re-write the entire dictionary in a single night. Blackadder, purely out of desperation, attempts this anyway, before getting stuck at "Aardvark".

Blackadder also claims that Baldrick has never changed his trousers, and implores him never to do so, for they are, Blackadder claims, akin to Pandora's Box, containing all the evils of the world.

Although he is now on a closer social standing to Blackadder than before, he still receives the same (and possibly more) level of abuse as his Elizabethan ancestor. Blackadder punches him; kicks him; breaks a milk-jug over his head; smashes a huge turnip on his head; roasts him for a few minutes on a spit; grabs him by the shirt collar; threatens to cut him up into strips and tell the prince that he "walked over a very sharp cattle grid in an extremely heavy hat"; and promises five minutes of hellish tortures involving a small pencil, surpassing anything possible from Beelzebub over all eternity. However, he does seem to have a higher level of friendship with Blackadder than the other series.

However, despite his noticeable flaws, this Baldrick has more success than any of the others. In an election rigged by Blackadder, he is elected Member of Parliament for Dunny-on-the-Wold, a rotten borough, although he was intended to be a puppet for Blackadder to manipulate (Blackadder's political opponents succeed in manipulating him instead). He is later made a Lord by Prince George, and is therefore eligible to sit in the House of Lords – whether or not he ever does so is another matter, as he is never again referred to by his title after episode 1. Baldrick also succeeds where no Baldrick has succeeded before or since, in calling Blackadder "a lazy, big-nosed, rubber-faced bastard".

Baldrick spends the £400,000 he received as a Lord on an enormous turnip ("Well, I had to haggle.") which he refers to as "dream turnip". However, Blackadder later destroys it by crushing it on Baldrick's head.

Baldrick is not given any sort of first name until this third series, when he speculates that it might be "Sodoff", since in childhood when he played in the gutter when he said to the other snipes, "Hello, my name's Baldrick," they would reply, "Yes, we know. Sod off, Baldrick!" A diplomatic Blackadder opts to record him as "S. Baldrick". The initial appears to have been adopted by his descendants. In a 1988 episode of The Noel Edmonds Saturday Roadshow, Baldrick of Blackadder the Third is on trial during Clown Court. During the "trial" Baldrick reveals that he thinks his name is Dropdead, since people who see him shout out "Drop dead, Baldrick!". The presiding judge, Lord Chief Justice Noel Edmonds, notes the name as "Mr. D. Baldrick".

This particular specimen of Baldrick can also be noted for his definition of "dog": "Not a cat" and "C": "Big, blue wobbly thing what mermaids live in". His command with words is also demonstrated in his "magnificent octopus" (magnum opus), a semi-autobiographical work that goes "Once upon a time, there was a lovely little sausage called Baldrick, and it lived happily ever after."

Baldrick later presented this story to Dr. Samuel Johnson as a replacement for the first dictionary (which he burned by mistake). The story had an unexpected effect on Johnson – he was reminded that he had forgotten to put the word "sausage" (and "aardvark") in his dictionary, and ran off in horror.

His heroes are the highwayman "The Shadow" and The Scarlet Pimpernel, (or the "Scarlet Pimple" as Baldrick believes his name to be). The former was executed as a result of Blackadder's informing, and the latter and his assistant were poisoned by him.

This Baldrick grew up in a supposedly-"haunted hovel", in which a vile, disgusting apparition would slowly make its way into his parents' bed at night. Curiously, this phantom vanished the very day Baldrick left home. In one cunning plan Baldrick tried to chop his mother's head off to solve the problem of her low ceiling.

As mentioned in the episode Sense and Senility, his uncle with the Baldrick surname once played as a "second codpiece" for the leading character of Macbeth, but only in the fight scenes. Blackadder concludes that the uncle was a "stunt codpiece" and inquires if he ever had a "large part", to which Baldrick answers that it "depends who was playing Macbeth".

Oddly enough, this Baldrick seems to have a bit of the idiot savant in him; Baldrick's explanation, although heard from someone else, of why George and Blackadder will be able to trade places is surprisingly smart and articulate, suggesting he might have an amazing memory with words, even if he does not understand what they mean.

Baldrick: You could have someone else fight the duel for you.
George: But I'm the Prince Regent! My portrait hangs on every wall.
Blackadder: Answer that, Baldrick.
Baldrick: Well, my cousin, Bert Baldrick, Mr. Gainsborough's butler's dogsbody, says that all portraits look the same nowadays, since they're painted to a romantic ideal, rather than as a true depiction of the idiosyncratic facial qualities of the person in question.
Blackadder: Well, your cousin Bert obviously has a larger vocabulary than you, Baldrick.

He also occasionally exhibits a surprising amount of knowledge of current events. When Edmund orders him to hire a horse, he replies: "Hire you a horse? For ninepence? On Jewish New Year? In the rain? A bare fortnight after the dreaded horse plague of old London Town? With the blacksmiths' strike in its fifteenth week and the Dorset horse fetishists fair tomorrow?" His reward for this is to be saddled (literally) with the job of horse himself.

Despite his lack of intelligence, though, he was, in Duel and Duality, able to manipulate Mrs. Miggins' casual conversation about how stupid Prince George was (George himself was present) so that it did not offend George. Additionally, in Sense and Senility, he warns the Prince of a supposed plot to kill him.

=== Blackadder's Christmas Carol ===
Mr. Baldrick is assistant in Ebenezer Blackadder's moustache shop. While still stupid, it seems that having to work for the exceedingly gullible Mr Blackadder has forced him to develop some of the savvy of his earlier ancestors. Unlike his previous (and later) ancestors, he has a simile of his own to match Blackadder's: "I just wish we weren't doing so well in the 'bit-short-of-pressies-and-feeling-a-gullible-prat' ledger." He remains the only person to be fooled by Tiny Tom Scratchit's alleged lameness, however. He is also possibly the only person ever to spell "Christmas" without getting any of the letters right (he apparently renders the word as "Kwelfnuve" then "corrects" it to "Kweznuz").

=== Blackadder Goes Forth ===
Private S. Baldrick (presumed dead 1917) is a private in a First World War trench, serving under Captain Blackadder and Lieutenant George. His hero is Lord Flashheart.

The fourth Baldrick comes from the lowest level of British Edwardian society. Before the war he was scraping a living at the "Turnip Street Workhouse". Upon the outbreak of hostilities the workhouse formed its own pals battalion which Baldrick signed up to join. In the final episode he says that all his friends have died, suggesting that he is the last surviving member of the Turnip Street Workhouse Pals.

Equal in foulness to the third Baldrick, Private Baldrick also matches his immediate predecessor in terms of stupidity. His "cunning plans", like those of his Elizabethan ancestor, have an insane, perverse logic to them. Examples include carving his name on a bullet, in relation to the old saying "a bullet with your name on it", his explanation being that if he owns the bullet, it could not ever kill him as he would not ever shoot himself ("shame", comments Captain Blackadder), and the chances of there being two bullets with "Baldrick" on them are "very small indeed". He has also been known to eat cigarettes as seen in the last episode of the series.

He also is the only Baldrick to confront Blackadder after being hit; he does so on one occasion, and is very conscious of class divisions. While this briefly attracts him to the ideals of Bolshevism, he is just as willing to marry General Melchett if it allows him to escape his lower-class status. His family seem to worship Lord Flashheart, declaring that they all took up smoking to collect cigarette cards bearing his image and that his grandmother smoked herself to death so they could afford the album.

In the first episode, Captain Cook, he claims to be the first Baldrick in the entire family tree to have a brilliant plan (becoming cooks for HQ to escape the trenches), giving a speech saying, "Permission to write home immediately sir! This is the first brilliant plan a Baldrick's ever had. For centuries we've tried, and they've always turned out total pig swill! My mum will be pleased as punch." This mood was however, slightly dampened when Blackadder pointed out the minor flaw: Baldrick is "the worst cook in the entire world". He also hates hospitals because his grandfather went into one and when he came out, he was dead. Blackadder then points out that he was also dead when he went in, because he'd been run over by a traction engine.

Private Baldrick's hobbies include cookery; his specialities include gourmet recipes involving rats.

This Baldrick is also a poet, composing The German Guns. During his time in the trenches, Baldrick also wrote a second poem.

S. Baldrick also does a Charlie Chaplin impression (although some believe it to be a slug balancing act, and General Melchett mistook it for a feeble impression of Buster Keaton).

Apart from during Blackadder's demonstration of slapstick comedy in the same episode, Baldrick generally does not get physically abused by Blackadder, although Blackadder frequently insults Baldrick and his family.

The opening sequence to each episode of series 4 features a ceremonial parade in which the company led by Captain Blackadder marches past General Melchett on a reviewing stand. Baldrick appears as part of the regimental band, splendid in scarlet and blue full dress, but not only walking out of line but also playing that most unmartial of instruments: a triangle.

Despite his stupidity, Baldrick delivers a profound speech while in preparation for the "final push", tension is high, and Baldrick demands, "Why can't we just stop sir? Why can't we just say 'no more killing, let's all go home'? Why would it be stupid just to pack it in, sir? Why?" Neither Captain Blackadder nor Lieutenant George are able to come up with a good answer beyond an attempted accusation of conscientious objection from George.

Private Baldrick never got to tell the audience his final "cunning plan" to escape the trenches, as he is sent "over the top" before he can reveal it to Blackadder, George and Captain Darling, though it possibly involved a splinter on the ladder. However, Baldrick stated that Blackadder was correct in the final plan being "as cunning as a fox who's just been appointed Professor of Cunning at the University of Oxford". In a rare and brief moment of sincerity towards Baldrick, Blackadder suggests that whatever Baldrick's plan was, it was probably "better than my plan of getting out of this by pretending to be mad. Who'd ever notice another madman around here?" The episode's ending implies that Baldrick is killed in that attack, along with Blackadder, George, and Darling.

=== Blackadder: Back & Forth ===
Baldrick is a septic tank cleaner to the 20th century Lord Blackadder in Blackadder: Back and Forth. His first appearance is serving Blackadder's millennium dinner, which he does wearing nothing but an amusing apron, on a whim. His cooking is similar to Private Baldrick's; he prepared dinner by coughing over an avocado. His underpants may date from the 18th century, or in any case smell as though they do, and turn out to be the cause of the extinction of the dinosaurs. Rather surprisingly he builds a working time machine, making him "the greatest genius who ever lived". Or it would do, if he knew how it worked and had not just built it using a combination of the plans of Leonardo da Vinci and an apparent skill at building Airfix models being able to make up for his inability to read the plans. Following his master's rewriting of history, he becomes Prime Minister of the United Kingdom – and possibly dictator, as the television commentator observes that elections have been abolished (although how much power he has with Edmund as king is questionable). His intelligence appears to be between that of the medieval Baldrick and the Elizabethan Baldrick. His "cunning plan" was possibly the only plan which a Blackadder ever thought was a good plan, albeit with a slight modification to it.

Also, Legionary Baldricus is a soldier under Centurion Blaccadicus in the Roman Britain section of Blackadder: Back & Forth as part of the forces defending Hadrian's Wall. He is apparently bilingual (although it is possible he is a local conscript and does not really understand Latin). He wears his helmet back to front, and was presumably killed by the attacking "Scots".

== Other Baldricks ==
- Bert Baldrick, dogsbody to Thomas Gainsborough's butler, is mentioned by the third Baldrick as his cousin, who says that Bert says that "all portraits look the same because they're painted to a romantic ideal rather than the idiosyncratic facial features of the person in question." Bert Baldrick, Blackadder observes, must have a far larger vocabulary than Sodoff Baldrick.
- Baldrick, slave to Grand Admiral Blackadder of the Dark Segment in the future section of Blackadder's Christmas Carol. He doesn't actually get to do much except stand around in a posing pouch. In an alternate future in which he is the Grand Admiral, he manages to destroy his own forces.
- One of the eight Ravens at the Tower of London is named Baldrick, presumably in response to the Blackadder series.
- The Comic Relief publication of the complete Blackadder scripts (Blackadder: The Whole Damn Dynasty 1485–1917) contains "Baldrick's Family tree", which mainly comprises all the children of a Baldrick being called Baldrick. Occasionally there are some exceptions. Some of the other entries in Baldrick's family tree include the common cold, dung beetles, ticks, Earls Court (change for Ealing), Ruislip, Pot plant, Paul Gascoigne, Ronald Reagan and his children Ronnie and Thingie. A Neolithic ancestor by the name of Bad Reek is mentioned as being present at the construction of Stonehenge. The sixth wife of Henry VIII is also claimed to be a Baldrick, on account of the king being "old, half-mad and suffering from syphilis at the time, [and so] was happy to get anything he could".
- Uncle Baldrick, who is never seen but who Baldrick says was an actor who played Macbeth's second codpiece ("Macbeth wore him in the fight scenes"..."Ah, so he was a stunt codpiece".). When asked if his uncle had "a large part" he replied that it depended on which actor played Macbeth.
- Private S. Baldrick's father, who is never seen but who Baldrick says was a nun (when the judge asked him his profession, he said "None"). His mother is frequently mentioned, and Blackadder says that she is a resident of London Zoo, has a complexion which is worse than Punch, from Punch and Judy, the famous puppet show, and Baldrick is her only human child. His grandfather died from being run over by a traction engine. His grandmother "smoked herself to death" so that Baldrick's family could afford the album of Lord Flasheart's cigarette cards.
- Robin Baldrick, the medieval Baldrick's father. All that is known about him is that he is a dung gatherer. He is never seen and is only mentioned once, in the opening credits of The Black Seal when the narrator referred to Baldrick as "Baldrick, Son of Robin the Dung Gatherer".

== Dynasty ==
- Bad Reek, Head Laborer of Stonehenge - Neolithic Britain
- Legionary Baldricus – Roman Britain
- Robin Baldrick the Dung Gatherer - Middle Ages Baldrick's father
- Baldrick, Bachelor of the Parish of Chigwell – Middle Ages
- Baldrick – Elizabethan
- Baldrick – English Civil War
- Sodoff, Lord Baldrick – Regency
- Bert Baldrick – Regency Baldrick's cousin
- Mr. Baldrick – 1858
- Private S. Baldrick – World War I
- The Rt Hon. S. Baldrick MP, Prime Minister, septic tank cleaner
