= The Donkeys (British band) =

- Origin: Wakefield, West Yorkshire, England
- Genres: Mod revival, Power pop
- Years active: 1978–1982
- Labels: Rhesus, Back Door, MCA, Detour Records
- Past members: Neil Ferguson; Dave Owen; Mark Welham; Tony Ferguson

The Donkeys were a power pop band from Wakefield, West Yorkshire that consisted of Neil Ferguson (lead guitar, vocals), Dave Owen (bass, backing vocals), Mark Welham (drums) and Tony Ferguson (rhythm guitar, backing vocals). They released five singles during the period 1979 to 1981.

The Donkeys wrote their own material and both sides of the first two singles were by Neil Ferguson. Then Dave Owen started to produce material that was issued as the remaining three singles, with Ferguson's compositions being used on the B-sides. "Don't Go" received considerable airplay by the disc jockey Mike Read on BBC Radio 1.

In 2004 a retrospective double album, Television Anarchy, was issued, in both CD and vinyl format, by Detour Records. The first disc contained the ten tracks that had formed the band's five singles, plus alternative versions of "Let's Float" and "Listen to Your Radio". The second disc contained previously unreleased material, with 18 tracks by Ferguson or Owen (they never collaborated) plus live cover versions of "Please Please Me" and "Do You Wanna Dance?".

== Singles ==
- "What I Want" / "Four Letters" – 1979 – Rhesus GO APE 102
- "No Way" / "You Jane" – 1980 – Rhesus GO APE 3
- "Don't Go" / "Living Legends" – 1980 – Rhesus GO APE 105
- "Let's Float" / "Strike Talks" – 1981 – MCA MCA 721
- "Listen To Your Radio" / "Watched By Everyone" – 1981 – MCA MCA 737
