= Lions led by donkeys =

Phrase used to criticise incompetent leaders

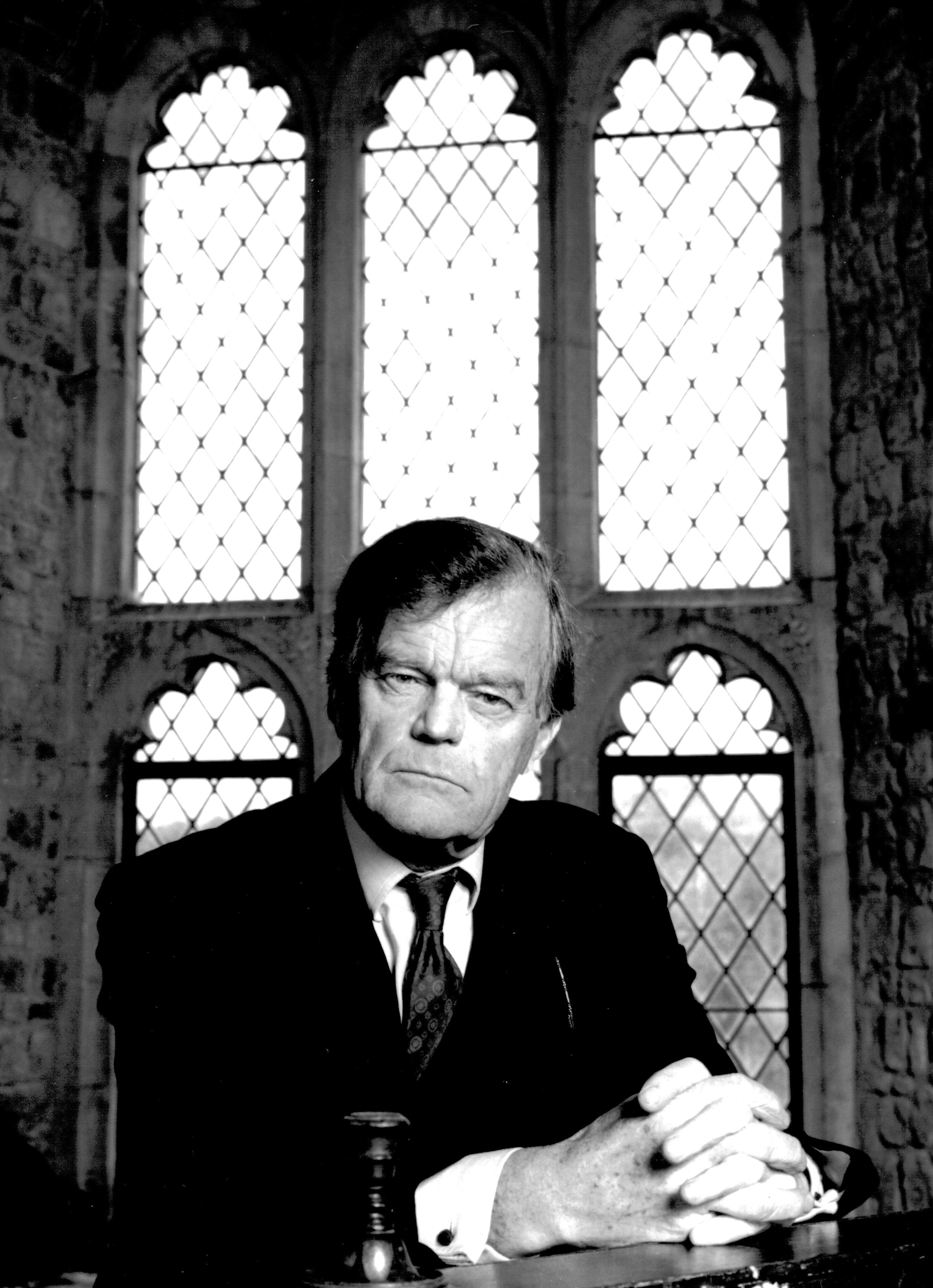
Alan Clark, who popularised the phrase

"Lions led by donkeys" is a phrase used to imply that a capable group of individuals are incompetently led. Coined in classical antiquity, the phrase was commonly used after World War I to contrast senior commanders who had led armies, most prominently those of the British Armed Forces, with the men they commanded. The historiography of the United Kingdom during the 20th century frequently described the infantry of the British Army as brave soldiers (lions) being sent to their deaths by incompetent and indifferent commanders (donkeys).

The phrase was implied by English popular historian Alan Clark in the title of his 1961 study of the Western Front of World War I, The Donkeys. Clark's work typified the mainstream historiographical view of World War I during the mid-20th century, being vetted by fellow historian B. H. Liddell Hart and helping to form mainstream perceptions of the conflict in the English-speaking world. His study, which characterised British general officers of the period as incompetent, has been the subject of intense criticism by other historians such as John Terraine.

The phrase has also been used in a variety of other contexts, all with the intent of praising a group of individuals while criticising their leaders.

== Origin ==
Plutarch (c. AD 46 – after AD 119) attributed to Chabrias the saying that "an army of deer commanded by a lion is more to be feared than an army of lions commanded by a deer". An ancient Arabian proverb says "An army of sheep led by a lion would defeat an army of lions led by a sheep". During the Crimean War, a letter was reportedly sent home by a British soldier quoting a Russian officer who had said that British soldiers were "lions commanded by donkeys". This was immediately after the Siege of Sevastopol (1854–55) and the failure to storm the fortress which, if true, would take the saying back to 1854–55. The phrase is quoted in Anna Stoddart's 1906 book The Life of Isabella Bird in the scene where Isabella, en route for the United States in 1854, passes a troopship taking the Scots Greys out to Balaclava. These and other Crimean War references were included in British Channel 4 television's The Crimean War series (1997) and the accompanying book (Michael Hargreave Mawson, expert reader).

Karl Marx and Friedrich Engels used the phrase on 27 September 1855, in an article published in Neue Oder-Zeitung, No. 457 (1 October 1855), on the British military's strategic mistakes and failings during the fall of Sevastopol, and particularly General James Simpson's military leadership of the assault on the Great Redan.

The joke making the rounds of the Russian army, that "L'armée anglaise est une armée de lions, commandée par des ânes" ["The English army is an army of lions led by asses"] has been thoroughly vindicated by the assault on Redan.

The Times reportedly used the phrase as "lions led by donkeys" with reference to French soldiers during the Franco-Prussian War:

Unceasingly they [the French forces] had had drummed into them the utterances of The Times: "You are lions led by jackasses." Alas! The very lions had lost their manes. (On leur avait répété tout le long de la campagne le mot du Times: – "Vous êtes des lions conduits par des ânes! – Hélas! les lions mêmes avaient perdus leurs crinières") Francisque Sarcey.

There were numerous examples of its use during the First World War, referring to the British and the Germans. In Rising Sun and Tumbling Bear: Russia's War with Japan (2003), Richard Connaughton attributed a later quotation to Colonel J. M. Grierson (later Sir James Grierson) in 1901, when reporting on the Russian contingent to the Boxer Rebellion, describing them as 'lions led by asses'. In his 1933 autobiography, member of parliament and retired naval officer Joseph Kenworthy (later Lord Strabolgi) lamented that the Royal Navy's reputation had suffered in the First World War, and that "It was a case of lions being led by asses."

== More recent usage ==
In the Second World War, German general Erwin Rommel said it about the British after he captured Tobruk.

In 2018, a British political campaign organisation named Led By Donkeys was established to oppose Brexit. The activists thought the name aptly described the relationship between the British people and their Brexit leaders.

== Attribution ==
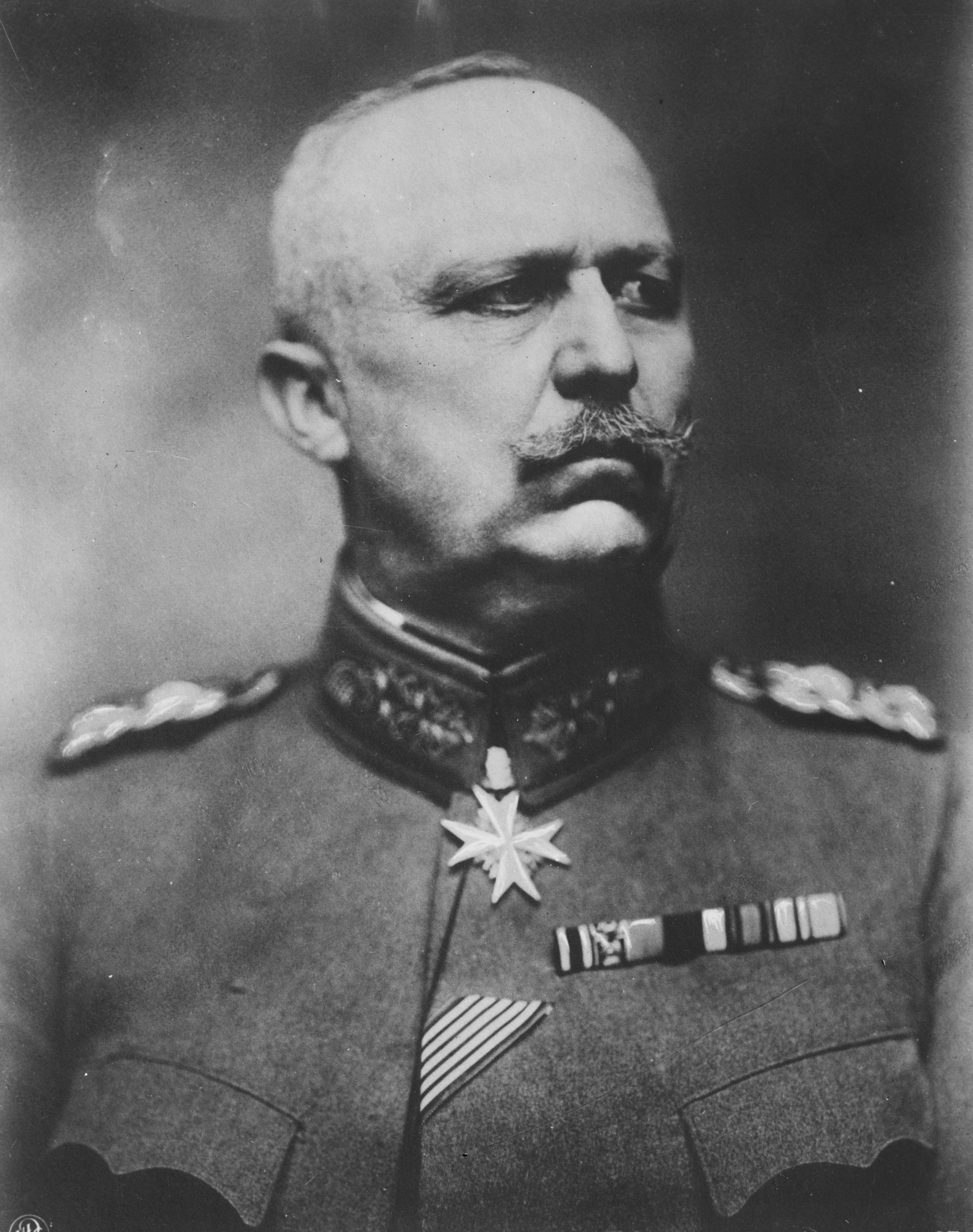
General Erich Ludendorff

Evelyn, Princess Blücher, an Englishwoman who lived in Berlin during the First World War, in her memoir published in 1921, recalled German general Erich Ludendorff at German General Headquarters' (Großes Hauptquartier) praising the British for their bravery: "I will put it exactly as I heard it straight from the Grosse Hauptquartier: 'The English Generals are wanting in strategy. We should have no chance if they possessed as much science as their officers and men had of courage and bravery. They are lions led by donkeys.'"

The phrase Lions Led by Donkeys was used as a title for a book published in 1927, by Captain P. A. Thompson. The subtitle of this book was "Showing how victory in the Great War was achieved by those who made the fewest mistakes".

Alan Clark based the title of his book The Donkeys (1961) on the phrase. Prior to publication in a letter to Hugh Trevor-Roper, he asked "English soldiers, lions led by donkeys etc. – can you remember who said that?" B. H. Liddell Hart, although he did not dispute the veracity of the quote, had asked Clark for its origins. Whatever Trevor Roper's reply, Clark eventually used the phrase as an epigraph to The Donkeys and attributed it to a conversation between Ludendorff and Max Hoffmann:

Ludendorff: The English soldiers fight like lions.
Hoffmann: True. But don't we know that they are lions led by donkeys.

The conversation was supposedly published in the memoirs of General Erich von Falkenhayn, the Chief of the German General Staff of the German Army between 1914 and 1916, but the exchange and the memoirs remain untraced. A correspondent to The Daily Telegraph, in July 1963, wrote that librarians in London and Stuttgart had not traced the quotation and a letter to Clark was unanswered. Clark was equivocal about the source for the dialogue for many years, although in 2007 a friend Euan Graham, recalled a conversation in the mid-sixties, when Clark on being challenged as to the provenance of the dialogue, looked sheepish and said "well I invented it". At one time Clark said Hart had given him the quote (unlikely as Hart had asked him where it came from) and Clark's biographer believes he invented the Ludendorff and Hoffmann attribution. This invention provided critics of The Donkeys with an opportunity to condemn the work. Richard Holmes, wrote

... it contained a streak of casual dishonesty. Its title is based on the "Lions led by Donkeys" conversation between Hindenburg [sic] and Ludendorff. There is no evidence whatever for this: none. Not a jot or scintilla. Hart, who had vetted Clark's manuscript, ought to have known it.

According to an article published in The Observer in 2008, TV historian Dan Snow was "stunned" to discover that his great-grandfather, Thomas Snow, "was a first world war general who sent thousands to die". Snow subsequently wrote an article for the BBC in 2014 discussing "10 big myths about World War One debunked", in which he posits the idea that "Much of what we think we know about the 1914–18 conflict is wrong" and that "This saying was supposed to have come from senior German commanders describing brave British soldiers led by incompetent old toffs from their chateaux. In fact the incident was made up by historian Alan Clark."

While Clark is said to have admitted to his imagining "the incident" this has no impact on the appropriate (or otherwise) use of the phrase, since a book with this title had been published by Captain Peter Thompson in 1927 (through an independent publisher, T. W. Laurie). Thompson was a well-travelled writer who had served in the Royal Army Service Corps – a forerunner of the Royal Logistics Corps. He was part of a small but growing group of soldiers-turned-writers who used their prodigious talents to raise profound questions about the nature and management of World War One.

== Popular culture ==
The musical Oh, What a Lovely War! (1963) and the comedy television series Blackadder Goes Forth (1989) are two well-known works of popular culture, depicting the war as a matter of incompetent donkeys sending noble (or sometimes ignoble, in the case of Blackadder) lions to their doom. Such works are in the literary tradition of the war poets like Wilfred Owen, Siegfried Sassoon and Erich Maria Remarque's novel (and subsequent film) All Quiet on the Western Front, which have been criticised by some historians, such as Brian Bond, for having given rise to what Bond considered the myth and conventional wisdom of the "necessary and successful" Great War as futile. Bond objected to the way that, in the 1960s, the works of Remarque and the "Trench Poets" slipped into a "nasty caricature" and perpetuated the "myth" of lions led by donkeys, while "the more complicated true history of the war receded ... into the background".

Producers of television documentaries about the war have had to grapple with the "lions led by donkeys" interpretive frame since the 1960s. The 1964 seminal and award-winning BBC Television The Great War has been described as taking a moderate approach, with co-scriptwriter John Terraine fighting against what he viewed as an oversimplification, while Hart resigned as an advising historian to the series, in an open letter to The Times, in part over a dispute with Terraine, claiming that he minimised the faults of the High Command on The Somme and other concerns regarding the treatment of Third Ypres. The Great War was viewed by about a fifth of the adult population in Britain and the production of documentaries on the war has continued ever since. While recent documentaries such as Channel 4's 2003 The First World War have confronted the popular image of lions led by donkeys, by reflecting current scholarship presenting more nuanced portrayals of British leaders and more balanced appraisals of the difficulties faced by the High Commands of all the combatants, they have been viewed by far fewer members of the public than either 1964's The Great War or comedies such as Blackadder.

== Criticism ==
Brian Bond, in editing a 1991 collection of essays on First World War history, expressed the collective desire of the authors to move beyond "popular stereotypes of The Donkeys", while acknowledging that serious leadership mistakes were made and that the authors would do little to rehabilitate the reputations of the senior commanders on the Somme. Hew Strachan quoted Maurice Genevoix for the proposition "[i]f it is neither desirable nor good that the professional historian prevail over the veteran; it is also not good that the veteran prevail over the historian" and then proceeded to take Hart to task for "suppressing the culminating battles of the war", thus "allow[ing] his portrayal of British generals to assume an easy continuum, from incompetence on the Western Front to conservatism in the 1920s...." While British leadership at the beginning of the war made costly mistakes, by 1915–16 the General Staff were making great efforts to lessen British casualties through better tactics (night attacks, creeping barrages and air power) and weapons technology (poison gas and later the arrival of the tank). British generals were not the only ones to make mistakes about the nature of modern conflict: the Russian armies too suffered badly during the first years of the war, most notably at the Battle of Tannenberg. German tactics are routinely criticised for involving the immediate counterattacking of lost ground, leading to lopsided losses in essentially defensive actions. To many generals who had fought colonial wars during the second half of the 19th century, where the Napoleonic concepts of discipline and pitched battles were still successful, fighting another highly industrialised power with equal and sometimes superior technology required an extreme change in thinking.

Later, Strachan, in reviewing Aspects of the British experience of the First World War edited by Michael Howard, observed that "In the study of the First World War in particular, the divide between professionals and amateurs has never been firmly fixed". Strachan points out that revisionists take strong exception to the amateurs, particularly in the media, with whom they disagree, while at the same time Gary Sheffield welcomes to the revisionist cause the work of many "hobby"-ists who only later migrated to academic study. Gordon Corrigan, for example, did not even consider Clark to be a historian. The phrase "lions led by donkeys" has been said to have produced a false, or at least very incomplete, picture of generalship in the First World War, giving an impression of generals as "château generals", living in splendour, indifferent to the sufferings of the men under their command, only interested in cavalry charges and shooting cowards. One historian wrote that "the idea that they were indifferent to the sufferings of their men is constantly refuted by the facts, and only endures because some commentators wish to perpetuate the myth that these generals, representing the upper classes, did not give a damn what happened to the lower orders". Some current academic opinion has described this school of thought as "discredited". Strachan quotes Gavin Stamp, who bemoans "a new generation of military historians", who seem as "callous and jingoistic" as Haig, while himself referring to the "ill-informed diatribes of Wolff and Clark".

== See also ==
- Historiography of the United Kingdom § First World War
