= Blackadder: Back & Forth =

2000 special directed by Paul Weiland based on the BBC series Blackadder

- Title card
- Genre: Science fiction Comedy; Satire
- Written by: Richard Curtis; Ben Elton
- Directed by: Paul Weiland
- Starring: Rowan Atkinson; Tony Robinson; Stephen Fry; Hugh Laurie; Tim McInnerny; Miranda Richardson; Patsy Byrne; Rik Mayall; Kate Moss; Colin Firth
- Composer: Howard Goodall
- Country of origin: United Kingdom
- Original language: English

Production
- Executive producers: Peter Bennett-Jones; Geoffrey Perkins
- Producer: Sophie Clarke-Jervoise
- Cinematography: Tony Pierce-Roberts
- Editor: Guy Bensley
- Running time: 37 minutes
- Production company: Tiger Aspect Productions
- Budget: £3 million

Original release
- Release: 31 December 1999

Blackadder: Back & Forth is a 1999 British science fiction comedy short film based on the BBC period sitcom Blackadder that marks the end of the Blackadder saga. It was commissioned for showing in the specially built SkyScape cinema erected southeast of the Millennium Dome on the Greenwich peninsula in South London. The film follows Lord Edmund Blackadder and his idiotic servant, Baldrick, on a time travel adventure that brings the characters into contact with several figures significant to British history.

In a 1999 interview, Richard Curtis described it as "an irreverent trek through British history – a time travel adventure story consisting entirely of people who are either rude or stupid." Rowan Atkinson and Tony Robinson reprised their roles as the series' core characters Blackadder and Baldrick, respectively. In an interview, Atkinson stated that making a Blackadder film had always been an ambition. Joining Atkinson and Robinson are other main cast members from the last three series, Stephen Fry, Hugh Laurie, Tim McInnerny and Miranda Richardson.

== Plot ==
At Blackadder Hall in 1999, Lord Blackadder (Rowan Atkinson) is entertaining four guests on New Year's Eve. He informs them he has built a time machine using plans drawn by Leonardo da Vinci and wagers £10,000 each that he can bring back any item from history they request. Archbishop Melchett (Stephen Fry), Archdeacon Kevin Darling (Tim McInnerny), Major George (Hugh Laurie), and Lady Elizabeth (Miranda Richardson) agree to this and challenge him to bring back a Roman centurion's helmet, wellingtons worn by the Duke of Wellington on the day of the Battle of Waterloo, and an ancient pair of 200-year-old underpants. The whole voyage is actually a scam, as Blackadder has, in fact, had Baldrick (Tony Robinson) retrieve the items from his storage, and the time machine is a prop. Blackadder stages the time machine travelling through time for his guests, with himself and Baldrick hiding inside, but when he opens the door, he finds it has actually worked.

They are now in the Cretaceous period, where they are confronted by a Tyrannosaurus. They throw away their wager items but are eventually able to defeat it using the underpants. Baldrick admits that, as he never got round to writing the dates on the dials, they cannot return to the present.

Blackadder and Baldrick return to Blackadder Hall but during the reign of Queen Elizabeth I (Miranda Richardson) who, mistaking him for his ancestor, orders his beheading unless he has a present for her. While rummaging through his pockets, Blackadder drops some Polo mints onto the floor, which he then offers to the Queen. She loves them, rewards him with her crown and orders him to go forth and bring back lots more "minty things". On his way back to the time machine, Blackadder meets William Shakespeare (Colin Firth). He gets his autograph before hitting him saying "that is for every schoolboy and schoolgirl for the next four hundred years" and leaves.

Blackadder tries to remember how the dials were set. They eventually land in Sherwood Forest and are captured by Robin Hood (Rik Mayall). Blackadder asks the Merry Men why they steal from the rich, facing certain death if caught, live in the forest with no toilet facilities, and yet give all they steal to the poor who, must accordingly view it as a reason not to work. Realizing Blackadder is right, the outraged Merry Men shoot Robin. After first having sex with Maid Marian (Kate Moss), Blackadder leaves, taking Robin's hat as a souvenir.

Next, the time machine lands upon the Duke of Wellington (just before he announces his plan to defeat Napoleon's forces) at the Battle of Waterloo in the process. Blackadder steps out to steal the Duke's boots, feeling he may as well try to win his wager. This is followed by them landing at Hadrian's Wall in Roman Britain, where they spy their Roman ancestors. After stealing a helmet, Blackadder and Baldrick escape from a charging group of Picts.

Baldrick mentions that dying people have their lives flash before them and that, if Blackadder was about to drown, he might see how the dials were originally set. Blackadder agrees with this and shoves Baldrick's head into the time machine toilet. The plan succeeds, and Baldrick remembers how to set the dials to return home. On the way back, as they look back on their adventure, Baldrick suggests that anyone can change the world for the better, though Blackadder argues that all most people can do is make money.

Returning to 1999, the party guests are impressed by what Blackadder has returned with, but due to his interference with history, Robin Hood is unknown, Shakespeare is only known as the inventor of the ballpoint pen (which he had left with him after punching him), and Britain has been ruled by the French since Napoleon's victory at Waterloo. Realising that he is to blame, Blackadder runs back into the time machine to, "save Britain!" He praises Shakespeare, charms Robin Hood, and saves the Duke of Wellington.

They return home to ensure that the original timeline has been restored and to collect Blackadder's winnings from his guests. He tells them to go upstairs and watch the New Year's festivities on television, assuring them he will soon return. He informs Baldrick he has a "very, very, very cunning plan", and they set off again in the time machine. The guests watch the broadcast of the British royal family and the prime minister arriving at the Millennium Dome. Blackadder is shown to now be the absolute monarch, King Edmund III, who is married to Queen Marian of Sherwood (Kate Moss), and is joined by figurehead Prime Minister Baldrick.

== Cast ==
English DVD Cover for Blackadder : Back & Forth showing a selection of characters from the film.

The cast reunited most of the regulars of series two to four of the television series, who each played a variety of different incarnations of themselves, in a similar fashion to Blackadder's Christmas Carol. The cast also included a number of cameos from British actors and celebrities.

- Rowan Atkinson as Lord Edmund Blackadder/King Edmund III and Centurion Blackaddicus
- Tony Robinson as Baldrick and Legionary Baldricus
- Stephen Fry as Archbishop Melchett, Lord Melchett, General Flavius Melchius, and the Duke of Wellington
- Hugh Laurie as Major George Bufton-Tufton, Viscount Bufton-Tufton and Consul Georgius
- Tim McInnerny as Archdeacon Darling, Duke of Darling and Duc de Darling
- Miranda Richardson as Lady Elizabeth and her relative Queen Elizabeth I
- Patsy Byrne as Nursie
- Colin Firth as William Shakespeare
- Rik Mayall as Robin Hood (a.k.a. Lord Flashheart)
- Kate Moss as Maid Marian
- Simon Russell Beale as Napoleon
- Jennie Bond as Royal Reporter
- Sacha Bennett as Will Scarlet (uncredited)
- Crispin Harris as Friar Tuck (uncredited)

== Production ==
Blackadder: Back & Forth was produced almost ten years after the final episode of the Blackadder television series, but reunited almost the entire cast and writers of series 2–4 of the television programme, with the exception of the original series producer, John Lloyd. Due to the increased budget, it is the only Blackadder story to be shot entirely on film and with no laugh track, although one was added for the BBC One broadcast in 2002. It is also the only Blackadder to be filmed in widescreen; 2.20:1 aspect ratio for cinema showings, and 16:9 (1.77:1) for the DVD and television screenings.

The film was co-financed by Sky and the BBC, with sponsorship from, among others, Tesco, with Blackadder trying to offer his loyalty card to Queenie.

The opening sequence features various depictions and photographs of historical scenes, edited to contain a Blackadder, accompanied by a full orchestral version of the Howard Goodall's Blackadder theme. The closing theme is a reprisal of the heroic version of the first series, with new lyrics sung by Giles Underwood; the lyrics appear onscreen with Blackadder's head as a bouncing ball.

== Screening rights dispute ==
In 1999, before Back & Forth had premiered at the Millennium Dome, a dispute broke out between Sky and the BBC over who had the right to broadcast the one-off special after the Millennium year. Sky claimed that they had paid £4 million for exclusive rights while the BBC argued that it was absurd that the channel from which the programme originated would not be screening it and that "[t]he stars agreed to do it on the basis that it would be on BBC One."

The film was shown at the 'SkyScape' cinema eight times a day throughout the celebratory year 2000. It was also aired on television, first on Sky One on 1 October 2000, and then on BBC One, where it was scheduled to be shown on Easter Sunday in 2002, but was postponed until 21 April because of the death of Queen Elizabeth The Queen Mother the day before.

== Rating, awards, and home media release ==
Because of the film's intended audience (it is rated PG rather than 15) a number of scenes were cut from the final edit.

The short was released onto VHS in 2000 and onto DVD in October 2001 by Video Collection International. The DVD release includes a corresponding "making of" documentary called Baldrick's Video Diary which contains select scenes cut out of the special, as well as the Comic Relief special Blackadder: The Cavalier Years.

All of this material, together with Blackadder's Christmas Carol, was later included on Disc 5 of the Blackadder Remastered: The Ultimate Edition DVD box set. The DVD release does not include the laugh track.

The film was nominated for "Best Situation Comedy" at the British Academy Television Awards 2001.

== See also ==
- Cultural references to Leonardo da Vinci
- List of fictional prime ministers of the United Kingdom
