= Richard Boden =

British television director and producer

Richard Boden (born 4 January 1953, Birmingham) is a British television director and producer best known for his work on situation comedies including 'Allo 'Allo!, Blackadder Goes Forth, 2point4 Children, Life of Riley and The IT Crowd, the latter two of which he is also the producer. He is also the producer of The Walshes. Starting his career at the BBC, he was later Head of Comedy for Carlton and Central Television, before going freelance in 2001.
