= George (Blackadder) =

Character in Blackadder

- Blackadder character
- The Prince Regent (left), Lt. George (right)
- First appearance: "Dish and Dishonesty" (series 3) "Captain Cook" (series 4)
- Last appearance: "Duel and Duality" (series 3) "Goodbyeee" (series 4)
- Portrayed by: Hugh Laurie

In-universe information
- Occupation: Prince regent (series 3); Lieutenant (series 4)
- Nationality: British
- Alma Mater: University of Cambridge (series 4)

George is a supporting character who appeared in various adaptations of the BBC sitcom Blackadder, played by Hugh Laurie. Two series saw a different incarnation of the character, because each was set in a different period of history. He was most prominently featured in the third and fourth series. The character was added to the series as a replacement for the Lord Percy Percy character, who did not appear in the third instalment because Tim McInnerny, the actor playing him, feared being typecast.

The first incarnation of the character was a caricature of George, Prince of Wales, serving as one of the three main characters of the third series. The second, Lt. The Hon. George Colthurst St Barleigh, was a young officer in the British Army during World War I, a supporting protagonist in the fourth series. Both portrayals were of "dim-witted upper-class twits", who depended greatly on Edmund Blackadder (Rowan Atkinson). The character garnered positive responses from critics.

== Personality ==
Both Prince George and Lt. George are portrayed as dim-witted "upper class twits". The son of King George III, Prince George is represented as a childish, spoiled, bumbling fool who spends money extravagantly (especially on impressive trousers and socks). Lieutenant George, stationed in the trenches of World War I, retains his enthusiastic naiveté, despite being stuck in the trenches for three years, revealing a lack of awareness of the seriousness of his circumstances; Robert Bianco of USA Today stated the character "smiles through in the face of certain death".

Both men are portrayed as very incompetent, in "Nob and Nobility", it takes Prince George a week to put on a pair of trousers by himself, eventually putting them on his head. George relies heavily on his butler, Mr. E. Blackadder Esq., even while Blackadder despises George for his stupidity. While George is considered foolish, and completely self-absorbed, he is helpful and loyal, and is aware he is not very intelligent, describing himself as "thick as a whale omelette". In a 2008 retrospective, co-star Stephen Fry said George's keenness for self-improvement was one of the things he felt made the character likeable. In "Duel and Duality," the final episode of the third series, after a sexual encounter with the Duke of Wellington's nieces, this princely incarnation of George is struck in the chest by a point-blank shot from the vengeful Wellington's pistol and killed, Wellington having become increasingly exasperated with George's behaviour, not realizing that George and Blackadder had switched identities. George briefly awakes, believing that he may have a cigarillo case on him that deflected the blow, but when he realises that he must have left the case at home on his dresser, promptly falls dead again in Baldrick's arms; Blackadder, disguised as the Prince Regent in order to take his place in the duel with Wellington, takes George's place to become George IV.

George's incarnation as Lieutenant The Honourable George Colthurst St. Barleigh MC, in Blackadder Goes Forth, is a frontline officer. His character draws a lot of similarities to the naive 2nd Lt. Raleigh from R C Sherriff's 1928 play Journey's End; as well as being strongly reminiscent in both manner and personality of Bertie Wooster (as whom Laurie would later go on to appear). George joined the army on the first day of World War I, along with nine other students at Cambridge University. The ten men named themselves the Trinity College tiddlywinks, or the "Trinity Tiddlers". It is revealed later, in the fourth series' finale, that George is the only surviving member of the group. Although he lacks any kind of skill, competence, or authority as an officer, his upper-class status and educational background meant he went straight into the commissioned ranks upon enlisting. George is shown to have a special friendship with General Melchett (Fry), an old family friend. Melchett even offers George a way out of the trenches for the "final push", which he refuses, much to Blackadder's incredulity. Although George is shown to have benefited from his background of privilege, he still remains a generally kind and hopeful individual, and shortly before the big push at the end of the final episode George finally expresses some genuine fear and sadness that he may indeed die.

In the 1989 sketch Shakespeare Sketch Laurie portrays a very George-like William Shakespeare. Lord Blackadder is his agent and manages to persuade him to condense his new play Hamlet.

=== Awards and decorations ===
In the series, Lieutenant George is seen wearing the following ribbons:

Military Cross	1914 Star	Croix de Guerre (France)

== Development ==
Tim McInnerny, who had starred in The Black Adder and Blackadder II as Lord Percy Percy, was afraid to be typecast in comedic roles and decided not to appear in the third instalment of Blackadder, though he did appear in the episode "Nob and Nobility", as Lord Topper, a snobbish aristocrat who claims to be The Scarlet Pimpernel, and returned in the fourth series playing Captain Kevin Darling. The Prince George character was created as a new "incompetent sidekick" for the title character. He was modelled on George IV of the United Kingdom, who served as prince regent between 1811 and 1820. Laurie had previously guest starred in the final two episodes of Blackadder II, making his debut appearance in the episode "Beer" as Simon Partridge and then the series finale episode, "Chains" as the main antagonist, Prince Ludwig the Indestructible, an evil German master of disguise later responsible for killing all the members of the court and the producers decided to cast him in the role of Prince George. Laurie's physical appearance differed significantly from that of George IV, who was obese during the time of his regency. Writers Ben Elton and Richard Curtis were unfazed by this, referring to George as "a fat, flatulent git", an appropriate description for the real Prince rather than Laurie.

Laurie was supposed to wear a monocle as Lt. George, the character's second incarnation, but eventually decided against it after it kept falling out of grasp. Laurie reprised the role of Prince George in the Christmas special Blackadder's Christmas Carol, and portrayed a new character, Lord Pigmot, set in the distant future. He also appeared in the millennium special Blackadder: Back & Forth, playing the Roman Consul Georgius and the modern day Major George Bufton-Tufton, The Viscount Bufton-Tufton. Although no new series or specials were made, the creators of the series have commented on various proposals over the years; one possibility was a film in which the main characters return as a 1960s' rock band, with George playing the guitar and keyboard. Curtis later said Laurie's international success with House would make a new Blackadder installment difficult.

== Reception ==
George, as well as Laurie, drew positive responses from critics. Tara Ariano and Sarah Bunting of Television Without Pity considered Laurie one of the best actors in the series' cast. Richard Barber of People lauded Laurie's performance as George as "hilarious" and "brilliant". David Smith of The Guardian highlighted the pathos of the performance, writing that Laurie's performance as Lt. George, as he was about to go over the top to his death, "elicited tears of both laughter and grief".
