= Two Cities =

Two Cities may refer to:

- Two Cities Films, a British film production company (includes Two Cities Television)
- Two Cities (novel), a 1998 American novel by John Edgar Wideman
- Two Cities (musical), a 2006 stage musical
- Two Cities, the episcopal area of the Anglican Bishop of London
- Cities of London and Westminster (UK Parliament constituency), colloquially known as Two Cities

== See also ==
- A Tale of Two Cities
- A Tale of Two Cities (speech)
