= Half Brother =

Half Brother may refer to:

- Half brother
- Half Brother (band), an English pop rock band
  - Half Brother (album)
- The Half Brother, a 2001 novel by Lars Saabye Christensen

== See also ==
- Half Brothers, a comedy directed by Luke Greenfield
- Apoorva Sagodharargal (disambiguation)
