= Apoorva =

Apoorva or Apurva may refer to:

- Apurva, the performative element of an injunction that justifies ritualistic acts and their results in Vedanta philosophy
- Apoorva (given name), an Indian given name
- Apoorva (2016 film), an Indian Kannada-language film directed by Ravichandran
- Apurva (2023 film), an Indian thriller film directed by Nikhil Nagesh Bhat

== See also ==
- Apoorva Sagodharargal (disambiguation)
