= Sent for You Yesterday =

1983 novel by John Edgar Wideman

- First edition
- Author: John Edgar Wideman
- Language: English
- Publisher: Avon Books
- Publication date: 1983
- Publication place: United States
- Media type: Print (paperback)
- Pages: 208
- Awards: PEN/Faulkner Award
- ISBN: 0-380-82644-5
- OCLC: 9450905
- Preceded by: Hiding Place
- Followed by: Brothers and Keepers

Sent for You Yesterday is a novel by the American writer John Edgar Wideman, first published in 1983 (in New York by Avon Books, and subsequently in London by Allison and Busby, 1984), set in Pittsburgh, Pennsylvania, during the 1970s.

The novel tells the story of Albert Wilkes, who, after seven years on the run, returns to Homewood, an African-American neighborhood of the East End.

Sent for You Yesterday is the third volume of what some critics call "The Homewood Trilogy". The other books are Damballah and Hiding Place, both published in 1981. In 1992 the University of Pittsburgh Press published the three in one volume under the title The Homewood Books. In its preface Wideman admits discomfort with the term trilogy because it implies a plan of linking the volumes, and he did not compose the books that way.

Sent for You Yesterday won the PEN/Faulkner Award in 1985.
