= Hiding Place (Wideman novel) =

1981 novel by John Edgar Wideman

- First edition
- Author: John Edgar Wideman
- Language: English
- Publisher: Avon Books
- Publication date: 1981
- Publication place: United States
- Media type: Print (Paperback)
- Pages: 158
- ISBN: 0-380-78501-3
- OCLC: 7897199
- Preceded by: The Lynchers
- Followed by: Sent for You Yesterday

Hiding Place is a novel by the American writer John Edgar Wideman set in Pittsburgh, Pennsylvania, during the 1970s. It was first published in 1981 by Avon Books in New York, and subsequently in London by Allison & Busby in 1984.

The novel tells the story of Tommy, a character who first appeared in Wideman's short-story collection Damballah. Tommy is a party to a bungled smash-and-grab raid that leaves a dead man in a parking lot, so he hides out with Mother Bess, a crazy old woman who lives in Homewood, an African-American neighborhood of the East End.

Elements of the character Tommy parallel the life of Wideman's brother Robbie, whose story he relates in a memoir published three years later called Brothers and Keepers.

Hiding Place is the middle volume of what some critics call "The Homewood Trilogy". The other books are Damballah and Sent for You Yesterday. In 1992 the University of Pittsburgh Press published the three in one volume under the title The Homewood Books. In its preface Wideman admits discomfort with the term trilogy because it implies a plan of linking the volumes, and he claims he did not compose the books that way.
