= Stephen Wayne Anderson =

American serial killer (1953–2002)

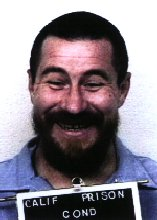
- Born: July 8, 1953; St. Louis, Missouri, U.S.
- Died: January 29, 2002 (aged 48); San Quentin State Prison, San Quentin, California, U.S.
- Cause of death: Execution by lethal injection
- Other name: Felix Smith
- Motive: Robbery
- Convictions: First degree murder with special circumstances Aggravated assault Aggravated burglary (4 counts); Burglary
- Penalty: Death

Details
- Victims: 3
- Date: 1977; 1980
- Country: United States
- States: Utah; California
- Date apprehended: May 26, 1980

Stephen Wayne Anderson (July 8, 1953 – January 29, 2002) was an American serial killer, burglar, and poet who was executed at California's San Quentin State Prison by lethal injection in 2002 for the 1980 murder of Elizabeth Lyman.

Anderson had escaped prison in 1979 and later admitted to committing at least seven other murders as a contract killer within a three-month timespan before Lyman's murder, as well as the killing of a fellow inmate during his first incarceration. It was determined that six of the alleged contract killings never happened, but police found reason to believe that the other two confessed homicides were legitimate, though he was only convicted in Lyman's murder.

During his stay on death row, Anderson became known for composing award-winning poetry, which led to requests for clemency to California Governor Gray Davis, arguing that his work was a sign of rehabilitation. While supporters claimed that Anderson had lied about perpetrating more than two murders, a reinvestigation in 2015 confirmed that Anderson was also responsible for the 1980 murder of Timothy Glashien.

== Early life ==
Anderson was born on July 8, 1953, in St. Louis, Missouri, as the older of two children. The family was poor and were often unable to buy food. His father, an oil worker, was an alcoholic who physically abused both of his sons while his mother, a court clerk, was emotionally neglectful, telling her sons that she "dreaded the days that you boys were born" and informing their neighbors that she "preferred her dogs to her children". Anderson himself described his parents favorably, calling his father a "good [and] fair man" and saying that his mother's mental issues were the result of a wrongful conviction for embezzlement in place of a corrupt judge, claiming that this latter event "altered his view of the world and of the justice system". In his later writings, Anderson conceded to abuse from his parents, this time noting that his father likely had unresolved issues stemming from the deaths of several friends during his service in World War II.

Anderson made an effort to protect his younger brother from the abuse and learned to change diapers at an early age to avoid upsetting their mother. Because of his mother's incarceration, Anderson was bullied in school as "Tweety Bird" and "Son of a Jail Bird". By 1971, the family had moved to Farmington, New Mexico, where Anderson, aged 17, was kicked out of the house after taking the blame for a house party organised by his brother. He subsequently spent some of his teenage years in the hillside outside of town. He fathered two sons, but did not keep in contact with them.

== Crimes ==
=== First incarceration ===
After being forced out of home, Anderson started burglarizing churches and schools for food and money. In 1971, he was arrested after breaking and entering into a school in Farmington. It was alleged that Anderson, who was armed with a rifle during the break-in, had pointed the weapon at two peace officers, though this threat was later disputed. In November 1971, he was convicted of aggravated burglary and sentenced to one to five years in prison and in 1973, he was convicted of an additional three counts of aggravated burglary. Although Anderson was granted parole for the first burglary in May 1975, he continued to serve a sentence of 10 to 50 years on the 1973 convictions in San Juan County, New Mexico.

In 1975, Anderson was sent out of state to the Utah State Prison as part of an agreement between New Mexico and Utah. While there, he non-fatally stabbed another inmate during a movie screening, resulting in a conviction for aggravated assault with a deadly weapon. On August 24, 1977, Anderson killed fellow inmate Robert Blundell. According to Anderson, the two had an argument in the prison kitchen over Blundell's "reputation as a snitch". Anderson claimed that Blundell made a "sexual threat" before leaving the kitchen, after which Anderson grabbed a kitchen knife, followed Blundell, and fatally stabbed him. He later assaulted a correctional officer.

=== Prison escape ===
In November 1979, Anderson escaped from prison in a walk-away during a prison furlough work program. According to his later confession, he became involved with "drug traffickers" and worked as a hitman in Las Vegas. Anderson only described the first of the "contract killings", which took place in Salt Lake County, Utah. Anderson had taken an offer from fellow former inmate Ace Fairbanks, a motorcycle gang member, who wanted Anderson to accompany him to a marijuana deal. On February 22, 1980, the pair picked up the buyer, 29-year-old Timothy Glashien, but became suspicious that he might try to inform police. Glashien was instead brought to Millcreek Canyon, where Anderson killed him with four gunshots. Glashien's body was discovered the next day by can collectors, with Anderson hiding out in Millcreek Canyon for several months, keeping the murder weapon, a .45 handgun, which he would later use in Lyman's murder. Anderson was paid $1,000 by Fairbanks. Anderson was quickly identified as a potential suspect, but no physical evidence could be tied to him at the time. Anderson later recanted the confession, but in June 2015, the Unified Police Department of Greater Salt Lake announced that enough evidence had been gathered through ballistic forensics to implicate a since executed Anderson and Fairbanks, who had died of a heart attack in 1986, in the murder of Timothy Glashien, though noting that the statute of limitations had already run out. Police also believed that the murder was not a contract killing as described by Anderson, but rather a robbery.

Anderson spent the following months homeless and traveled around by hopping trains. On May 26, 1980, shortly after midnight, Anderson burglarized the house of 81-year-old Elizabeth Lyman, a retired piano teacher, in Bloomington, California, which he had spied on for several days before. After drinking a pint of vodka, Anderson cut Lyman's telephone line with a knife, and shortly after 1:00 a.m., he broke into her home by removing a glass pane from her French doors. He checked the house for occupants room by room. He claimed that he did not know Lyman was home and that he intended to steal a car from the house, unaware that Lyman did not own a vehicle. When he entered Lyman's bedroom, she awoke and screamed. Anderson shot her in the face from a distance of eight and twenty inches with a .45 caliber handgun, fatally wounding her. He covered her body with a blanket, recovered the expelled casing from the hollow-point bullet that killed her, and ransacked her house for money. Most media reported that he recovered less than $100, with Anderson claiming it was $80 in private correspondence with author Bell Gale Chevigny, while court records estimated it was around $112. Anderson stayed in Lyman's home for nearly three hours. He cooked himself a bowl of macaroni and eggs in the kitchen before going to the living room to watch television. A neighbor called police during this time after being awoken by Lyman's dogs barking and spotting Anderson through a window. Sheriff's deputies arrived at the scene at 3:47 a.m. and arrested Anderson, who had remained where he was, still eating his food.

== Investigation ==
Within the next days, Anderson was interrogated twice while in custody at a substation in Fontana, California. The first questioning was undertaken three hours after his arrest by two homicide detectives of San Bernardino County Sheriff's Department, while the second took place on 28 May with Salt Lake County Sheriff's Office Sergeant Jerry Thompson, who had previously interacted with Anderson.

After waiving his Miranda rights, Anderson confessed to killing Elizabeth Lyman, and disclosed his fugitive status to the California detectives. He was held for a further 72 hours without charge to await the arrival of Utah officials, during which investigators pressed him for other admissions. He subsequently claimed responsibility for eight other murders, those of Robert Blundell, Timothy Glashien and six contract killings in Las Vegas that happened prior to Lyman's murder. He only gave detailed accounts of the killings of Blundell and Glashien, with Nevada never prosecuting the other six cases. An officer involved in Anderson's arrest stated that while he believed Anderson's responsibility in the former two murders, he was doubtful of the "vague statements" regarding the supposed Las Vegas killings, later recalling that other law enforcement officers contacted by him could not identify any cases matching Anderson's descriptions. As of 2002, there was no evidence that these additional murders occurred at all. Anderson repeated his admission to the killings of Blundell and Glashien to Utah authorities during the second interrogation, but as California police had ignored a statement by Anderson to invoke his right to remain silent, and, per the ruling of County of Riverside v. McLaughlin, violated Anderson's Fourth Amendment right by keeping him in unreasonable detention, during which he was "kept in isolation, fed a restricted diet, and deprived jail privileges", the confession was suppressed as evidence in his later trial.

During questioning, Anderson told the detectives, "I was born and trained to be a killer. [...] I always wanted to be a killer." However, he described these statements as a "bravado boast" during his appeals process. The "killer" statements were prominently brought up by prosecutors in their argumentation, both during his trial and appeals process, saying that they appeared contrary to Anderson's later claims of remorse. Prosecutors thus described Anderson as having an "anti-social personality" and later referred to him as a sociopath during his trial, while California Department of Corrections psychiatrist Robert Flanagan, who was present during the second interrogation, maintained that Anderson had no mental illness or other impairment. While Anderson later claimed that he purposely waited to be caught, he stated during the initial interrogation that he regretted not leaving sooner or shooting the first responders.

== Trial ==
During his trial, Anderson conceded the murder of Elizabeth Lyman, but denied the murder of Timothy Glashien and claimed that the killing of Robert Blundell was self-defense. His defense also denied that any murders occurred in Las Vegas. Anderson's psychiatrist stated that his client had a "brain abnormality", which "diminished his capacity to form a specific intent" after alcohol consumption, which was disputed by a different psychiatrist and a neurologist. Anderson's attorney, S. Donald Ames, was later criticized for poor representation, which had previously led to the overturning of two death sentences of two other clients defended by Ames, with further scrutiny following due to Ames' past record for "rude, chauvinistic and mean" behavior and lavish spendings, with his former employer noting that he had a history of intentional incompetency in capital cases on account of his anti-Black racist views. While Anderson was never convicted of the two killings in Utah, the prosecution used them as justification for the death penalty in Anderson's case.

On May 6, 1981, Anderson was convicted of first degree murder with special circumstances. On July 24, he was sentenced to death. In his opening statements at the penalty phase, the prosecutor cited Anderson's violent history in prison as for why he should be executed. He said Anderson had proven himself to be dangerous even in prison.

So remember that when you consider what he's done and what he's testified to. This particular individual is a sociopath. He cannot live with anybody. He cannot get along with anybody. He kills people everywhere. He stabs people everywhere. He has stabbed an individual in prison. And you'll have the court documents that shows where he pled guilty. And he admitted that while in the Utah State Prison sitting in a movie he stabbed an inmate there. And as a result of that stabbing he was convicted of aggravated assault by a prisoner with a deadly weapon. He stabbed Mr. Blundell and killed Mr. Blundell while he was in prison. He admitted that he killed him. He told you that just before he came down here from San Quentin he got into a fight with the people in San Quentin and his housing was changed because he was fighting. There is no place that anybody is going to be safe from this individual. He looks out for old number one, and that's all he's concerned with. And forget about the rest of the world.

== Death row ==
In prison, Anderson was noted for using force and violence in 1984 and 1985, as well as assaulting another prisoner in 1987. During this time, Anderson's legal team argued that it had not been conclusively determined if Anderson had killed Lyman intentionally and in 1986, the California Supreme Court granted Anderson a retrial for the special circumstances of his murder conviction. The jury in this case affirmed the findings of the 1980 trial and again imposed a death sentence. In 1990, Anderson unsuccessfully attempted to file for a reversal of his convictions at the San Bernardino County Superior Court, which were followed by numerous failed attempts at filing a habeas corpus writ with various district courts.

Following his transfer to death row, Anderson began having depression and subsequently started writing poems and learning Latin. By 1993, he won two awards and an honorable mention from PEN America's Prison Writing Award. His writings were initially about his remorse for the murder of Elizabeth Lyman, but eventually expanded to themes such as prison life, the human condition, and death, usually in connection to his impending execution. He was one of several prison writers on San Quentin's death row to correspond with author D. Quentin Miller. One of Anderson's works became the basis of an off-Broadway play, Lament From Death Row. Later tests showed that Anderson had an IQ of 136.

Anderson isolated himself on death row, weighing nearly 300 pounds (140 kg) by the time he died. Upon learning of his execution date six weeks beforehand, Anderson refused to go outside, see spiritual advisors or receive phone calls, instead spending time finishing a novel. His writing material was taken away ahead of his transfer to death house holding, five days before his execution, shortly after completing his last work, "The Last Poem I Will Write". It was noted that unlike other death row inmates at San Quentin, no family or friends came to visit him. One of his sons, aged in his late 20s in 2002, reportedly remained unaware of his father's execution.

== Execution ==
As a result of his literary success, there was a campaign to have Anderson's death sentence overturned, supported by relatives of Elizabeth Lyman and Robert Blundell. Anderson himself voiced no support for a change to his penalty and before his death, he told his lawyer, who recommended skipping sleep to be exhausted during the execution, that he wanted to "feel it all" as repentance. Both California Governor Gray Davis and the U.S. Supreme Court denied clemency, the latter by unanimous decision. Anderson was given the choice of execution method, either lethal injection or gas chamber, ultimately picking the former. Shortly before the execution, Anderson's lawyers filed a lawsuit to have California Lieutenant Governor Cruz Bustamante review the clemency request, claiming Davis was biased on account of his previous denials of three other such requests from death row inmates.

On January 29, 2002, Anderson was executed by lethal injection at San Quentin State Prison. The execution began at 12:16 a.m. and Anderson was pronounced dead at 12:30 a.m. PT. Anderson's last meal consisted of two grilled cheese sandwiches, one pint of cottage cheese, a hominy/corn mixture, one slice of peach pie, radishes, and one pint of chocolate chip ice cream. He told the warden that he had no last words, although he reportedly mouthed the words "Thank you" to one of his public defenders, Margo A. Rocconi, who had whispered "I love you" to Anderson three times while on the gurney.

Anderson's remains were cremated and sent to an anonymous friend in Farmington.

== See also ==
- Jack Henry Abbott
- Jack Unterweger
- Capital punishment in California
- Capital punishment in the United States
- List of people executed in California
- List of people executed in the United States in 2002

Preceded by Robert Lee Massie	Executions carried out in California	Succeeded by Donald Jay Beardslee
