= Apoorva Sagodharargal =

Apoorva Sagodharargal (lit. 'Unique Brothers' in Tamil) may refer to these Indian films:

- Apoorva Sagodharargal (1949 film), a 1949 film
- Apoorva Sagodharargal (1989 film), a 1989 film by Singeetam Srinivasa Rao
  - Apoorva Sagodharargal (soundtrack), for the 1989 film by Ilaiyaraaja

== See also ==
- Apoorva Sahodarigal, a 1983 Indian Tamil film
- Apoorva Sahodarulu, a 1986 Indian Telugu film by K. Raghavendra Rao
- Apoorva (disambiguation)
- Half Brother (disambiguation)
