= John Edgar Wideman =

American writer (born 1941)

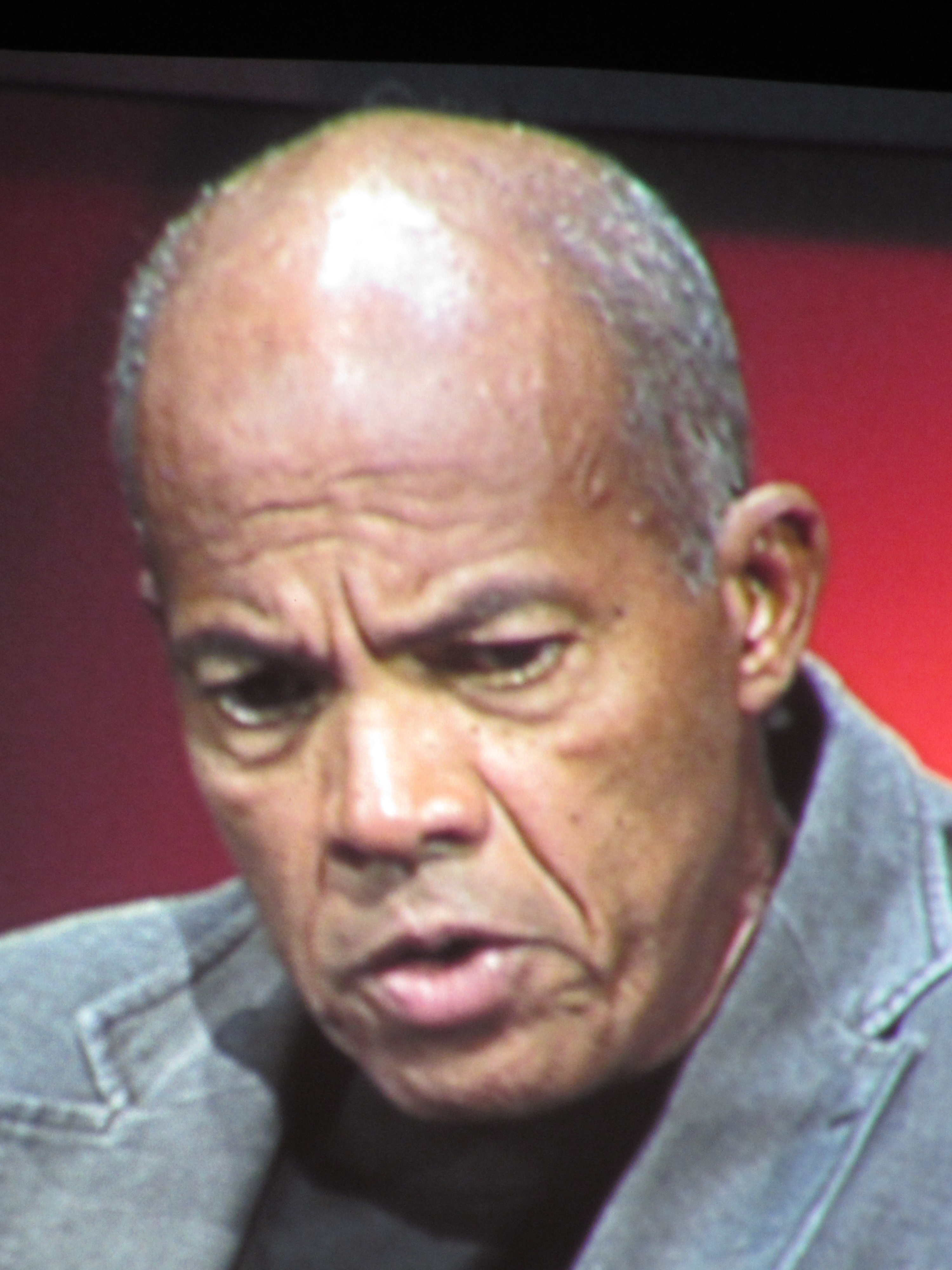
- Wideman at the Anisfield-Wolf Book Awards in 2010
- Born: June 14, 1941 (age 85); Washington, D.C., U.S.
- Education: University of Pennsylvania; University of Oxford; University of Iowa
- Occupations: Author, Professor (emeritus)
- Spouse: Judith Ann Goldman (m. 1965; div. 2000) ; Catherine Nedonchelle (m. 2004)
- Children: 3 Jacob (born 1970) Jamila (born 1975)
- Writing career
- Period: 1967–present
- Notable work: Brothers and Keepers (1984)
- Notable awards: PEN/Faulkner Award for Fiction (1984, 1991); MacArthur Fellowship (1993); Prix Femina Étranger (2017); PEN/Malamud Award (2019)

John Edgar Wideman (born June 14, 1941) is an American novelist, short story writer, memoirist, and essayist. He was the first person to win the PEN/Faulkner Award for Fiction twice. His writing is known for experimental techniques and a focus on the African-American experience.

Raised in Pittsburgh, Pennsylvania, United States, Wideman excelled as a student athlete at the University of Pennsylvania. In 1963, he became the second African American to win a Rhodes Scholarship to attend the University of Oxford. In addition to his work as a writer, Wideman has had a career in academia as a literature and creative writing professor at both public and Ivy League universities.

In his writing, Wideman has explored the complexities of race, family, trauma, storytelling, and justice in the United States. His personal experience, including the incarceration of his brother, has played a significant role in his work.

He is a professor emeritus at Brown University and lives in New York City and France.

== Early life and education ==
Wideman was born on June 14, 1941, in Washington, D.C., the oldest of five children of Edgar (1918–2001) and Bette (née French; 1921–2008) Wideman.

Wideman traces his roots to the period of American slavery. On his mother's side, his great-great-great-grandmother was a slave from Maryland who had children with her master's son. Together, they relocated to Pittsburgh either during or immediately after the American Civil War. According to Wideman family lore, this ancestor first settled the area that eventually became the Pittsburgh neighborhood of Homewood, despite the fact that a white lawyer and politician, William Wilkins, is credited with founding the community. On Wideman's father's side, his ancestors have been traced to rural South Carolina, where records indicate there were both white and African-American Widemans, including one who owned slaves. Wideman's paternal grandfather moved to Pittsburgh as part of the Great Migration of the early 20th century, when many African Americans fled Southern states.

Wideman's father, Edgar, graduated high school in Pittsburgh, where he was an avid basketball player. After marrying Wideman's mother, Bette, he moved with her to Washington, D.C., for a job in the U.S. Government Printing Office. The couple moved back to Pittsburgh's Homewood neighborhood after Wideman was born in 1941. During World War II, Wideman's father enlisted in the U.S. Army and was stationed in Charleston, South Carolina, and on Saipan. After the War, he worked several jobs simultaneously, including as a waiter and sanitation worker, in order to support the family. Wideman's youngest brother, Robert, was born in 1951 while the family was living in Homewood. With the support of Edgar's earnings, the family was able to move to Shadyside, a predominantly white neighborhood, allowing Wideman to attend Peabody High School.

Wideman's teachers had noted his intelligence from an early age, and he proved to be an outstanding student. In high school, he was a star basketball player, president of the student body, and valedictorian of his class. However, Wideman was socially cautious, especially around white students. Interviewed for an article in 1963, one of his white classmates recalled Wideman telling her that "he wouldn't want to be seen on the street alone with a white girl" and that "when class breaks came, he would seldom walk to the next class with the white students".

=== College ===
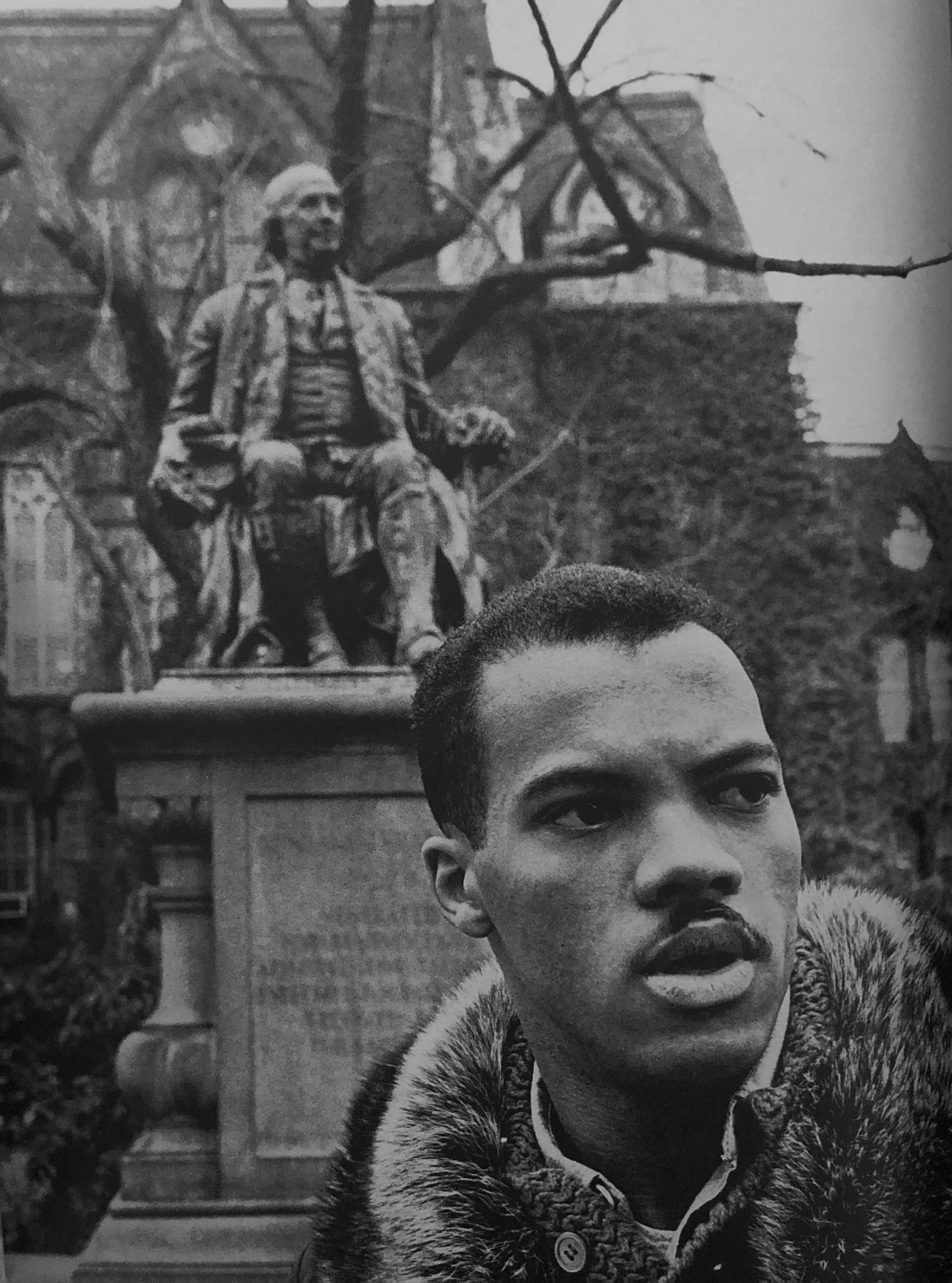
Wideman in Look magazine, 1963

Wideman attended the University of Pennsylvania, where he was offered a Benjamin Franklin Scholarship for academic merit and was one of a small number of African Americans to enroll in 1959. (Note: Byerman claims 10 African Americans enrolled at Penn in 1959, a number Wideman uses in his memoir, Brothers and Keepers. A website published by Penn's University Archives and Records Center claims there were only six African-American enrollees in 1959, out of a class of more than 1,700.) In his memoir, Brothers and Keepers, he described a heated freshman-year encounter with a white student in the dorm room of an African-American friend: the white student claimed to know more about blues music than Wideman did, and his friend refused to offer support. According to Wideman, the encounter left him feeling that he had "no place to hide", and he was in an environment "that continually set me against them and against myself". Feeling alienated, he decided to quit college, but was stopped by his basketball coach at a bus station, where Wideman was about to board a bus back to Pittsburgh.

Addressing his brother in Brothers and Keepers, he summarized his motivation:

I was running away from Pittsburgh, from poverty, from blackness. To get ahead, to make something of myself, college had seemed a logical, necessary step; my exile, my flight from home began with good grades, with good English, with setting myself apart long before I'd earned a scholarship and a train ticket over the mountains to Philadelphia... if I ever had any hesitations or reconsiderations about the path I'd chosen, youall were back home in the ghetto to remind me how lucky I was.

Once again, Wideman excelled academically and in athletics, becoming a star basketball player. By his senior year, he was captain of the basketball team, which he led in scoring, and was named to the "All Ivy League" team. While his team lost the Ivy League championship to Princeton University his senior year, they won the "Big 5" tournament, which has traditionally determined the best college basketball team in Philadelphia, pitting Penn against Villanova, Saint Joseph's, La Salle, and Temple universities. For his academic achievements, which included winning campus-wide awards for both creative and scholarly writing, Wideman was inducted into the Phi Beta Kappa national honor society.

In 1963, before graduating with a bachelor's degree in English, Wideman was named a Rhodes Scholar, becoming the second African American to win the prestigious award from the University of Oxford. (Note: Wideman shared this distinction with another African-American student, J. Stanley Sanders of the University of Southern California, who was also named a Rhodes Scholar in 1963.) The achievement brought him national attention: he was profiled in Look that spring, in an article entitled "The Astonishing John Wideman". It described Wideman as having been "showered with so many academic and athletic honors, awards and 'firsts' that he is unable to enumerate them. He sometimes forgets that he won a prize that another student would consider the high point of a college career".

In the fall of 1963, Wideman moved to England to begin his studies at Oxford, where he pursued a thesis on 18th-century British fiction. He also continued to play basketball and was captain of the Oxford University men's basketball team, where one of his teammates was fellow Rhodes Scholar, and future NBA All-Star and United States Senator, Bill Bradley. The two had played against each other as undergraduates, when Bradley was at Princeton. At Oxford, their team won the 1965 B.U.S.F. National Championship and the 1966 A.B.B.A. National Championship.

In 1965, Wideman married Judith Goldman, a white Jewish woman from Long Island whom he began dating when both were undergraduates at Penn. The following year, Wideman received a BPhil degree from Oxford and returned to the U.S. He spent the 1966–67 academic year at the Iowa Writers Workshop, where he studied under Kurt Vonnegut and José Donoso.

== Writing and teaching career ==
=== Philadelphia and early novels ===
In 1967, Wideman accepted a faculty position at the University of Pennsylvania. That summer, his first novel, A Glance Away, was published. Wideman's editor, Hiram Haydn, had seen his profile in Look and contacted Wideman before he left for Oxford, asking the aspiring author to send him his writing. While Wideman was at Oxford, Haydn read the unfinished manuscript of A Glance Away and agreed to publish it. The novel garnered positive reviews. A reviewer in The New York Times Book Review described Wideman as "a novelist of high seriousness and depth" who had written "a powerfully inventive" debut.

Responding to student demand, Wideman offered Penn's first classes in African-American literature in 1968. In the same year, his first son, Daniel, was born. Wideman also became an assistant coach for the varsity men's basketball team for which he had played as a student.

In 1970, Wideman's second son, Jacob, was born. In the same year, his second novel, Hurry Home, was published. A reviewer for The New York Times admired the novel's "dazzling display" of "Joycean" prose and Wideman's "formidable command of the techniques of fiction".

Wideman's initial courses in African-American literature grew into a program in African American Studies, which Wideman helped to establish. From 1971 to 1973, he served as director of the program. In 1972, he stepped down as an assistant basketball coach.

In 1973, Wideman's third novel, The Lynchers, was published. Examining violent strains of black nationalist ideology that had emerged during the 1960s, the novel depicts African-American characters who plan to lynch a white police officer. Writing in The New York Times, Anatole Broyard claimed that Wideman "can make an ordinary scene sing the blues like nobody's business", although he found the novel to be flawed.

In 1974, Wideman was promoted to a full professorship of English at Penn, and he received a grant from the National Endowment for the Humanities to pursue research in African-American literature. However, he had already begun to look for a reprieve from his duties at the institution, as well as life in Philadelphia, in order to focus on his writing and raising a family. Having previously visited the University of Wyoming, he accepted an offer to join its faculty.

=== Wyoming, brother's murder conviction, literary success ===
Wideman joined the faculty of the University of Wyoming in 1975. That same year, Wideman's daughter, Jamila, was born. The circumstances of her birth were traumatic, as a complication caused Wideman's wife, Judith, to be transported by ambulance from Laramie, Wyoming, to Denver, Colorado, where Jamila was born two months premature.

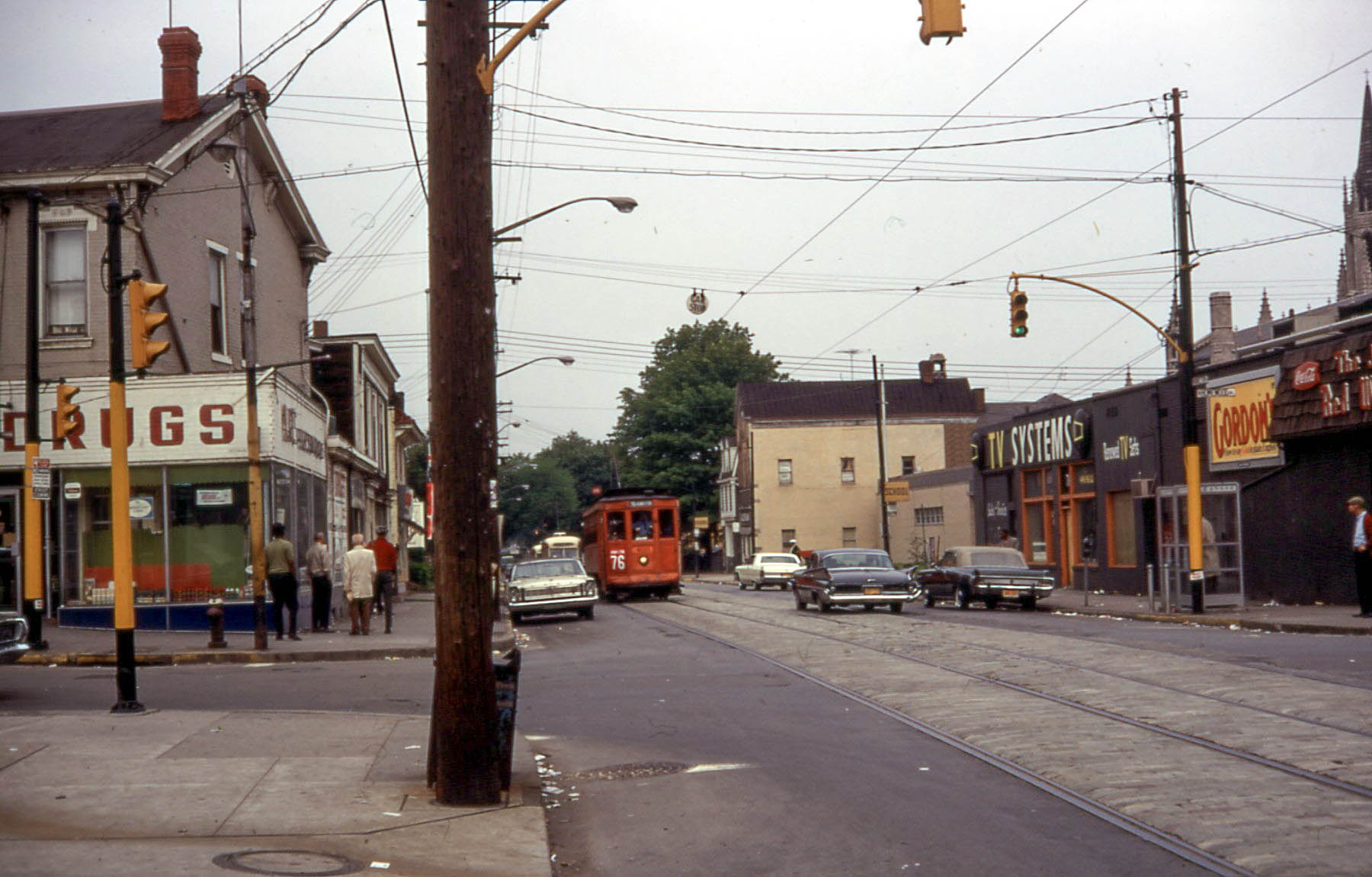
Homewood, Pittsburgh, 1960s

After the family returned to Laramie, Wideman learned that his brother Robert, with whom he had grown up in Homewood, was a fugitive. During the 1960s and early 1970s, the neighborhood was in a state of decline—it has frequently been described as a ghetto. Robert began to use drugs, a habit which he supported via petty crime. In November 1975, along with two accomplices, he participated in a robbery scheme that went awry when the intended victim, a fence named Nicola Morena, fled. One of Robert's accomplices shot Morena as he ran. A short time later, a passerby encountered the wounded man and called for an ambulance. Morena was taken to the nearest hospital, which did not have the surgeon necessary to treat his wound, and after a period of waiting, he was transported to another hospital, where he died. The victim's family later filed a lawsuit against the city of Pittsburgh, the hospitals and doctors involved, and the ambulance drivers, claiming negligence. That suit was not successful, although the Supreme Court of Pennsylvania acknowledged that a delay in Morena's treatment was "a contributing factor in causing his death". The family ultimately settled a malpractice lawsuit against the hospital system.

Robert and his accomplices fled Pittsburgh and arrived in Laramie, where Wideman let them spend a night in his house, an act he has attributed to naïveté. Robert and his accomplices then drove to Colorado, where they were apprehended. Afterward, police in Wyoming accused Wideman of aiding a fugitive, but no charges were filed.

According to Pennsylvania law, because the attempted armed robbery of Morena resulted in a homicide, the charge against the shooter was second-degree murder, and because Robert was an accomplice, he faced the same charge as the shooter. At trial, Robert was found guilty and sentenced to life in prison without the possibility of parole. All of his appeals failed.

Wideman incorporated his brother's experience into his work. After an eight-year publication hiatus, he published two books simultaneously: a story collection, Damballah, and a novel, Hiding Place, both of which appeared in 1981 and allude to the events that resulted in Robert's imprisonment. He followed these books with another novel, Sent for You Yesterday, in 1983. Because these books share characters and a setting in the Pittsburgh neighborhood of Homewood, they are frequently referred to as the "Homewood trilogy".

The trilogy was celebrated upon publication, inspiring a claim in The New York Times that Wideman was "one of America's premier writers of fiction". For many critics and scholars, the trilogy represents Wideman's artistic breakthrough, with some even considering it his greatest literary achievement. Surveying Wideman's career in The Nation in 2016, the critic Jesse McCarthy claimed that the trilogy shows Wideman "achieving a distinctive voice that is more confident and vernacular than in his early work". Some of the stories in Damballah have been widely anthologized.

In 1984, Wideman followed the successful Homewood trilogy with what has been called his most popular book, Brothers and Keepers. Wideman's first memoir delves into his brother Robert's story. Stylistically, the book is distinctive for its use of multiple voices, alternating between Wideman and his brother. It is also notable for its exploration of the realities of the American criminal justice system and life in prison, particularly for African Americans. Ishmael Reed, reviewing the book in The New York Times, called it "a rare triumph". Writing in The New York Review of Books in 1997, Joyce Carol Oates claimed that it belongs among the "masterpieces of American memoir".

=== Massachusetts, son's murder conviction, prolific period ===
In 1986, Wideman joined the faculty of the University of Massachusetts at Amherst, where the prominent author James Baldwin was a visiting member of the faculty. Wideman taught in the MFA Program for Poets and Writers.

In the same year, Wideman's son, Jacob, who was sixteen years old, stabbed a roommate, Eric Kane, to death during a youth camping trip in Arizona. He then fled the state. At his parents' urging, he surrendered to law enforcement, and after being released into parental custody, underwent psychiatric evaluation in Massachusetts. During his stay in a psychiatric facility, he called police in Arizona and confessed his guilt. However, before a judge, he pleaded not guilty, and his case was scheduled for trial. A plea bargain was then struck, in which Jacob pleaded guilty to first-degree murder and was sentenced to life in prison, with a possibility of parole after 25 years. A year after the murder, Wideman wrote a letter to the Kane family, forgiving them for wanting the death penalty for Jacob, and they responded angrily.

Wideman then entered what is, to date, the most prolific period of his career. A novel written before Jacob's crime, entitled Reuben, appeared in 1987. This was followed by a collection of stories, entitled Fever (1989). The following year saw the publication of the novel Philadelphia Fire, which garnered both critical acclaim and literary awards. Inspired by the police's 1985 bombing of the Philadelphia headquarters of the black liberation group known as MOVE—an act that resulted in the death of five children and the loss of two city blocks—the "intense, poetic narrative" centers on one man's attempt to find, and write about, a child rumored to have survived the tragedy.

Philadelphia Fire was followed by a story collection, The Stories of John Edgar Wideman (later re-issued as All Stories Are True) in 1992; a memoir, Fatheralong: A Meditation on Fathers and Sons, Race and Society (1994), and two more novels, The Cattle Killing (1996) and Two Cities (1998). Notably, while Wideman wrote about his son's story in some of these books (for example, in Philadelphia Fire and in Fatheralong) he has not written a memoir about it. In interviews, he has frequently declined to discuss the case.

During this period, Wideman was in demand as "one of America's most distinguished writers". He edited anthologies, provided introductions for books, and appeared in various media, including television, to comment on societal issues, particularly those affecting African Americans. Additionally, his daughter, Jamila, became a star basketball player and, in 1997, the third overall pick in the inaugural draft of the Women's National Basketball Association, bringing further media attention, including a cover story in Sports Illustrated magazine.

In 2000, Wideman and his wife, Judith, divorced.

In 2001, the University of Massachusetts appointed Wideman a Distinguished Professor; it was the same year that another memoir, Hoop Roots, appeared, focusing on Wideman's experience as a player and fan of basketball. A review in Bookpage hailed it as "one of the best books ever written about the sport". It was followed by a nonfiction book on Martinique entitled The Island: Martinique (2003).

=== Brown and latest work ===
In 2004, Wideman was appointed Asa Messer Professor and Professor of Africana Studies and Literary Arts at Brown University. In the same year, he married French journalist Catherine Nedonchelle.

The following year, his story collection, God's Gym, was published. This was followed by his first novel in a decade, and tenth overall, Fanon, which appeared in 2008. In 2010, a collection of flash fiction, entitled Briefs, was published, inspiring a theatrical adaptation that premiered in Los Angeles in 2018.

In 2014, after a decade at Brown University, and nearly 50 years in academia, Wideman became an emeritus professor. He has since published a hybrid work of fiction and nonfiction that explores the life of Louis Till, the father of Emmett Till, entitled Writing to Save a Life: The Louis Till File (2016).

In 2018, Wideman published a collection of stories titled American Histories, and in 2021, a selection of his short fiction, produced over four decades, was published as You Made Me Love You: Selected Stories, 1981–2018. Publishers Weekly proclaimed the collection "a stunning showcase" that confirms Wideman's place in American literature. Look for Me and I'll Be Gone (2021) was described in The Guardian review as "tales about being Black, being dead and dying, some imagined and some based on his own experiences", concluding: "This is truly inimitable storytelling. No one writes an American horror story like John Edgar Wideman."

Canadian critic Randy Boyagoda in a review for The New York Times of Wideman's 2024 book, Slaveroad, states: "The title of his latest book affords its governing premise. Rather than the 'whale-road' sung of by Anglo-Saxon bards, or the 'Black Atlantic' researched and taught by academics, the ocean that carried the enslaved from Africa to the United States should be understood as a transhistorical, permanent 'slaveroad,' whose forced travelers and accidental sojourners Wideman evokes on the page. ... In short chapters marked by riverine sentences and blunt self-reproach ('Stay in your lane'), both of which are compelled by his imaginative trespass into other people's experiences, Wideman reveals the slaveroad's presence in his own life and in the world."

== Family ==
Wideman was married to Judith Ann Goldman (1943–2023), an attorney, from 1965 until their divorce in 2000. The couple had three children together: Daniel Wideman is a poet, playwright, and essayist, as well as a business executive; Jacob Wideman was convicted of a murder committed while he was a minor and sentenced to life in prison in Arizona, and Jamila Wideman is a lawyer and executive at the National Basketball Association, having played professional basketball in the Women's National Basketball Association and the Israeli League.

In 2004, Wideman married French journalist Catherine Nedonchelle. He resides in France and on the Lower East Side of Manhattan in New York City.

Wideman's brother, Robert, was sentenced to life in prison without the possibility of parole for his role in a 1975 murder. After more than 40 years in prison, his sentence was commuted and he was released on July 2, 2019.

== Work ==
External videos
- In this video from 1994, John Edgar Wideman appears on The Charlie Rose Show to discuss his work. (22 mins)

Wideman's work has been, and continues to be, the focus of academic study. The John Edgar Wideman Society was formed to promote scholarship and awareness of his work. Affiliated with the American Literature Association, it held its first international conference in 2003. Wideman's papers, including manuscripts, correspondence, and other materials, are housed at the Houghton Library at Harvard University.

=== Style ===
Wideman's writing is known for its complexity, with critics describing it as cerebral and experimental. It is also known for combining traditional English diction with African-American Vernacular English. In some works, Wideman's writing relies on sentence fragments, whereas elsewhere, he has written a single sentence that spans several pages. He has sometimes used the stream-of-consciousness technique and sudden, unannounced shifts in perspective. In much of his writing, Wideman eschews punctuation such as question marks or quotation marks, relying instead on context to identify speakers or discern questions from statements. In some cases, Wideman mixes nonfiction and fiction in the same work.

Among scholars, there has been discussion as to whether Wideman is a modernist or a postmodernist writer. The scholar D. Quentin Miller, however, argues that Wideman's works "resist categorization".

=== Themes ===
While Wideman's work is thematically diverse, some common themes emerge. Most prominently, Wideman is known for his exploration of race, a subject that factors in all of his books. His fiction depicts African-American characters dealing with the challenges and alienation of life in a predominantly white society. His work also depicts the ways that race and racism are constructed by, and manifested in, society—from language to interpersonal relationships to interactions with the state.

Another chief concern of Wideman's writing is family, particularly as the key unit of community and cultural survival. Yet family, for Wideman, is inherently contentious: his writing investigates the ways that family is necessary for protection and individual development, while at the same time proving to be something one needs to be protected from in order to find one's true self. This exploration is explicit in Brothers and Keepers, in which Wideman and his brother navigate the complexities of their familial relationship.

Another of Wideman's frequent themes is storytelling. Of particular importance is the notion that "all stories are true", which Wideman has used in multiple works, including as the title for one of his story collections. The scholar Heather Russell explains that, in focusing on this concept, Wideman's writing "reflects African American traditions of storytelling within which myth, history, parable, parody, folklore, fact, and fiction exist in synergy. Storytelling functions as a bridge between both past, present, and future and between history, memory, and the imagination".

Frequently in Wideman's work, storytelling is focused on trauma—expressing it, escaping it, or healing from it. Trauma, in Wideman's work, can exist on the level of the individual and for all of society. The scholar Tracie Church Guzzio summarizes Wideman's approach to trauma when she claims that his writing "illustrates that the trauma suffered by African Americans in the period of slavery in America is re-lived and re-experienced in the continuing racism confronting African Americans in their daily lives as well as in the images projected by history, literature, and popular culture".

=== Influences ===
In interviews, Wideman has typically declined to identify his influences. However, scholars and critics have pointed to figures that, judging from Wideman's work and interviews, appear to be literary or intellectual influences. These include W. E. B. Du Bois (to whom Wideman has dedicated work), Frantz Fanon (inspiration for Wideman's novel, Fanon), Ralph Ellison, James Baldwin, and, especially in his early work, the modernist writers James Joyce, T. S. Eliot, and William Faulkner.

== Selected bibliography ==
=== Novels ===
- A Glance Away (Harcourt, 1967). ISBN 978-0557314775
- Hurry Home (Harcourt, 1970). ISBN 978-0557314829
- The Lynchers (Harcourt, 1973). ISBN 978-0557314836
- Hiding Place (Avon Books, 1981). ISBN 978-0395897980
- Sent for You Yesterday (Avon Books, 1983). ISBN 978-0395877296
- Reuben (Henry Holt, 1987). ISBN 978-2070732340
- Philadelphia Fire (Henry Holt, 1990). ISBN 978-0618509645
- The Cattle Killing (Houghton Mifflin, 1996). ISBN 978-0395877500
- Two Cities (Houghton Mifflin, 1998). ISBN 978-0618001859
- Fanon (Houghton Mifflin, 2008). ISBN 978-0547086163

=== Omnibus editions ===
- The Homewood Trilogy (Avon Books, 1985). ISBN 978-0380895649
- The Homewood Books (University of Pittsburgh Press, 1992). ISBN 978-0822938316
- Identities: Three Early Novels by John Edgar Wideman (Henry Holt, 1994). ISBN 978-0805035926

=== Story collections ===
- Damballah (Avon Books, 1981). ISBN 978-0395897973
- Fever (Henry Holt, 1989). ISBN 978-0805011845
- The Stories of John Edgar Wideman (Pantheon Books, 1992; published as All Stories Are True, Vintage Books, 1993). ISBN 978-0679407195
- God's Gym (Houghton Mifflin, 2005). ISBN 978-0618711994
- Briefs (Lulu Press, 2010). ISBN 978-0557310043
- American Histories (Scribner, 2018). ISBN 978-1501178351
- You Made Me Love You: Selected Stories, 1981-2018 (Scribner, 2021). ISBN 978-1982148911
- Look for Me and I'll Be Gone (Scribner, 2021). ISBN 978-1982148942

=== Memoirs and other ===
- Brothers and Keepers (Henry Holt, 1984). ISBN 978-0618509638
- Fatheralong: A Meditation on Fathers and Sons, Race and Society (Pantheon, 1994). ISBN 978-0679407201
- Hoop Roots: Basketball, Race, and Love (Houghton Mifflin, 2001). ISBN 978-0395857311
- (Editor) My Soul Has Grown Deep: Classics of Early African-American Literature (Running Press, 2001). ISBN 978-0762410354
- (Editor) 20: The Best of the Drue Heinz Literature Prize (University of Pittsburgh Press, 2001). ISBN 978-0822941705
- The Island: Martinique (National Geographic Directions, 2003). ISBN 978-0792265337
- Writing to Save a Life: The Louis Till File (Scribner, 2016). ISBN 978-1501147296
- Slaveroad (Scribner, 2024). ISBN 978-1668057216

== Honors ==
=== Athletic honors ===
- Philadelphia Big 5 Hall of Fame, inducted 1974
- University of Pennsylvania Athletics Hall of Fame, inducted 1998

=== Honors for body of work ===
In 1993, the John D. and Catherine T. MacArthur Foundation, in awarding him a fellowship, noted that Wideman "has contributed to a new humanist perspective in American literature, distilling personality and history, crime and mysticism, art and the exigencies of material life into his work." Honors bestowed for his entire body of work include:

- Honorary Doctorate, University of Pennsylvania (1986)
- John Dos Passos Prize for Literature (1986)
- Lannan Literary Award in Fiction (1991)
- Honorary Doctorate, Rutgers University (1991)
- American Academy of Arts and Sciences, Elected Member (1992)
- St. Botolph Club Foundation Distinguished Artist Award (1992)
- MacArthur Foundation Fellowship (1993)
- Lila Wallace-Reader's Digest Writers' Award (1998)
- Rea Award for the Short Story (1998)
- Honorary Doctorate, Colby College (1998)
- Honorary Doctorate, University of Bern (1998)
- Honorary Doctorate, John Jay College of Criminal Justice, City University of New York (1999)
- New England Book Award for Literary Excellence (2001)
- Honorary Doctorate, Columbia College Chicago (2003)
- Langston Hughes Medal (2004)
- American Philosophical Society, Elected Member (2005)
- Katherine Anne Porter Award of the American Academy of Arts and Letters (2008)
- Honorary Doctorate, State University of New York at New Paltz (2010)
- Anisfield-Wolf Book Awards Lifetime Achievement Award (2011)
- American Academy of Arts and Letters, Elected Member (2016)
- Honorary Doctorate, Duquesne University (2017)
- Lannan Literary Award for Lifetime Achievement (2018)
- Stephen E. Henderson Award for Outstanding Achievement (2019)
- PEN/Malamud Award for Excellence in the Short Story (2019)
- F. Scott Fitzgerald Award for Achievement in American Literature (2021)

=== Honors for individual works ===
- American Library Association Notable Books List for Sent for You Yesterday (1984)
- PEN/Faulkner Award for Fiction for Sent for You Yesterday (1984)
- American Library Association Notable Books List for Brothers and Keepers (1985)
- National Magazine Award for "Doc's Story", originally published in Esquire (1987)
- PEN/Faulkner Award for Fiction for Philadelphia Fire (1991)
- American Book Award for Philadelphia Fire (1991)
- James Fenimore Cooper Prize for Best Historical Fiction for The Cattle Killing (1997)
- O. Henry Award for "Weight", originally published in Callaloo (2000)
- O. Henry Award for "Microstories", originally published in Harper's Magazine (2010)
- Prix Femina Étranger for Writing to Save a Life: The Louis Till File (2017)
- PEN Oakland/Josephine Miles Literary Award for Writing to Save a Life: The Louis Till File (2017)
- O. Henry Award for "Maps and Ledgers", originally published in Harper's Magazine (2019)
- The Wall Street Journal "10 Best Books of 2021" for Look for Me and I'll Be Gone (2021)

Wideman's winning the PEN/Faulkner Award for Fiction in 1991 marked the first time a writer had won that prize twice, a feat that has since been accomplished by three other writers: Philip Roth, E. L. Doctorow, and Ha Jin.

In addition, Wideman's memoir, Brothers and Keepers, and his book, Writing to Save a Life, were both finalists for the National Book Critics Circle Award. His memoir, Fatheralong, was a finalist for the National Book Award. via Wideman's short works have been widely anthologized, including in the Norton Anthology of African American Literature, the Oxford Book of American Short Stories, and The Heath Anthology of American Literature, among others.

Wideman has been a visiting fellow, professor, or speaker at numerous institutions. His work has been translated into many languages.
