= The Story of Music =

- Chatto & Windus edition
- Author: Howard Goodall
- Language: English
- Subject: history of classical music
- Publisher: Chatto & Windus, Vintage
- Publication date: 2013
- Pages: 359
- ISBN: 9780701187521
- OCLC: 802294392
- Website: Playlists for The Story of Music

The Story of Music is a work of nonfiction by English composer and broadcaster Howard Goodall, first published in 2013 by Chatto & Windus, which covers the history of largely Western classical music from pre-history to 2012. The book is associated with the 2013 BBC2 documentary series Howard Goodall's Story of Music. The book's reception was broadly positive, with the main criticism being of its treatment of Schoenberg and the atonal movement.

== Background ==
Goodall (born 1958) is a well-known English composer of choral music, musical theatre and scores for television; he is also a television presenter who has written and presented several documentary series on musical history topics, leading to his being described as having "a tireless zeal for spreading the love of music." The 2000 series Howard Goodall's Big Bangs forms the basis of his earlier book, Big Bangs: The Story of Five Discoveries that Changed Musical History, which focuses on how the development of music has been driven by pivotal discoveries, such as the invention of musical notation and recording technology, and The Story of Music also expounds this idea. Goodall has stated that he likes pop music as much as he does classical, and The Story of Music frequently draws parallels between the two genres.

=== Television series ===
The Story of Music is associated with a six-episode television series, Howard Goodall's Story of Music, produced by Tiger Aspect and broadcast on BBC2 in January–March 2013. Aimed at a general viewer, the television series explains musical developments in nonspecialist English; Goodall states "This is an overview, for someone who doesn't have a music degree. It's an attempt to make the basic building blocks of music clear". Both series and book try to avoid technical nomenclature, or "jargon"; Goodall considers when writing about the "aural sensation" that is music: "quite a lot of the words begin to get in the way and become more of a hindrance." The series also avoids assigning music to the conventional eras, such as Baroque music, and is instead divided into six broad time periods, dubbed "ages": "The Age of Discovery", "...Invention", "...Elegance & Sensibility", "...Tragedy", "...Rebellion" and "The Popular Age".

== Publication history ==
The book was first published in 2013 under the Chatto & Windus imprint of Random House. It was reissued in paperback (368 pages) by the Vintage imprint of Penguin Random House on 3 October 2013 (ISBN 978-0-099-58717-0); an e-book edition is also published by Vintage.

== Contents ==
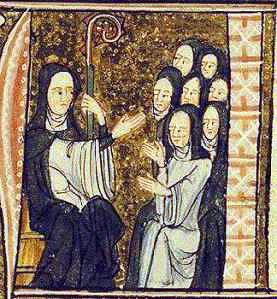
Hildegard of Bingen (left), one of the earliest composers whose name is known

The book is organised on a similar scheme to the television series, based on time periods but with slightly different divisions into eight chapters plus the introduction. "The Age of Discovery, 40,000 BC–AD 1450" starts with the earliest evidence for musical instruments, and goes on to cover the invention of modern musical notation by Guido of Arezzo in around 1000 AD. The chapter also reviews the earliest named composers including Hildegard of Bingen and Pérotin. "The Age of Penitence, 1450–1650" covers the development of improved musical instruments and the introduction of opera, as well as composers including Josquin, Dowland and Monteverdi.

"The Age of Invention, 1650–1750" focuses on J. S. Bach and the invention of the equal temperament tuning system and the piano. It also reviews other composers of the era, including Lully, Corelli, Biber, Vivaldi and Handel. "The Age of Elegance and Sentiment, 1750–1850" surveys the classical era, focusing on Haydn and Mozart. It then goes on to cover the early Romantic era, focusing on Beethoven and also reviewing Schubert, Mendelssohn, Field, Schumann and Chopin. The later Romantic era is covered in "The Age of Tragedy, 1850–1890", with composers including Berlioz, Verdi, Liszt, Dvořák and Wagner.

"The Age of Rebellion, 1890–1918" opens by reviewing Modernist composers broadly within the classical tradition including Satie, Mahler, Schoenberg, Richard Strauss, Mussorgsky, Debussy and Stravinsky. It then introduces popular music including jazz and Blues. The chapter also covers the invention of recording technology. The final pair of chapters, "The Popular Age I, 1918–1945" and "The Popular Age II, 1945–2012", open with the invention of radio broadcasting, and focus on the growth of pop music and its interaction with classical forms.

The book is illustrated with 38 photographs, mainly in colour, as well as occasional diagrams and musical quotations interspersed throughout the text. There is a 17-page index. A playlist is appended, listing a few key pieces of music for each chapter; these are also available for download via Spotify on Goodall's website. There are 2 pages of books suggested for further reading.

== Critical reception ==
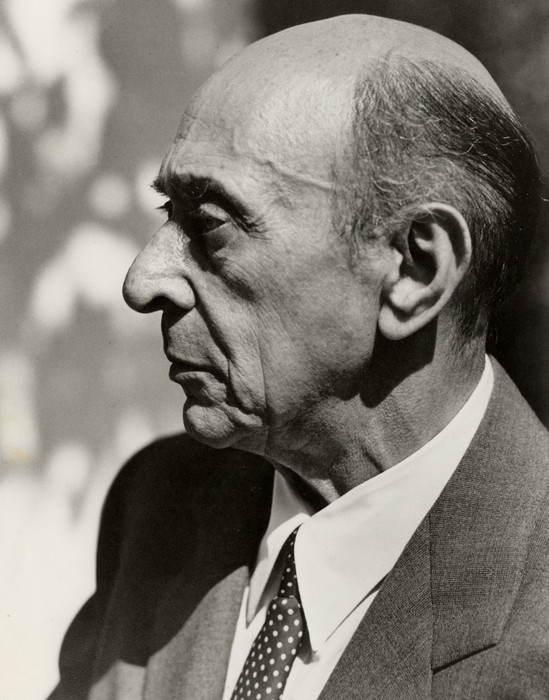
Arnold Schoenberg (1874–1951), associated with atonalism

Reviews of the book in British newspapers were generally broadly positive. Ivan Hewett, music critic for The Telegraph, gives the book four out of five stars, describing it as "a racily written, learned and often shrewdly insightful". He highlights Goodall's "amusingly knockabout" presentation, and considers Goodall's appraisal of Satie and Picabia's ballets as "frivolous" (in the context of the ongoing First World War) to be "refreshing". Nicholas Lezard, music book reviewer for The Guardian, praises Goodall's attempt to convey the qualities of music in the written medium, singling out his "masterly" treatment of the period from Haydn to Schubert. He notes that the final work mentioned is the author's own. Stuart Kelly, literary editor of The Scotsman, calls the book a "clever, engaging read", praising the broad coverage and the eschewal of terms such as "Romantic" and "classical" that Kelly deems "problematic" in the context of music; he also appreciates Goodall's foregrounding of British composers. Christopher Hart, writing in The Sunday Times, calls the book "a lively zip through some 45 millennia", and singles out the "excellent" treatment of Liszt. He terms the book's treatment of religion, particularly Catholicism, a "glaring oddity", and also points out occasional minor errors in facts, dates and spelling. Ben East, writing in The Observer, describes the book as a "snappily written journey" and praises the "captivating" material on Beethoven. Liz Thomson, writing in The Independent, gives a more critical review, characterising the book as "too facile for the audience most likely to engage with it but which will leave the casual listener... floundering".

The book's unearthing of numerous unusual facts is foregrounded in several reviews: Lezard mentions "surprising and fascinating factoids" and Hart calls them "entertaining ClassicFM-style snippets". Several reviewers comment on the "thought-provoking and sobering" notion on the book's opening page that, until the invention of recording in the latter part of the 19th century, a music lover would only ever hear their favourite works a handful of times. Multiple reviews highlight Goodall's habit of unexpectedly referencing modern pop culture; East states that the "populism... grate[s] at times". Hewett calls attention to the fact that the last two chapters covering the 20th century focus on pop music; Kelly considers these chapters to raise "provocative" issues.

Goodall's treatment of the atonal movement and especially its exponent Schoenberg also draws criticism from several reviewers. Lezard calls attention to Goodall's dismissive treatment of both atonality and serialism, criticising the work as falling within what he terms the "grand British tradition of near-philistinism"; Hewett describes the material on Schoenberg as "wrong-headed" and a "serious blot" on the work as a whole. Kelly describes the coverage of Schoenberg as "intemperate", and also criticises Goodall's dismissal of Wagner. Hart, however, agrees with Goodall's assessment of the atonal movement.

== See also ==
- The Rest Is Noise: Listening to the Twentieth Century, a 2007 book by Alex Ross
