= Howard Goodall =

English composer (born 1959)

Howard Goodall CBE
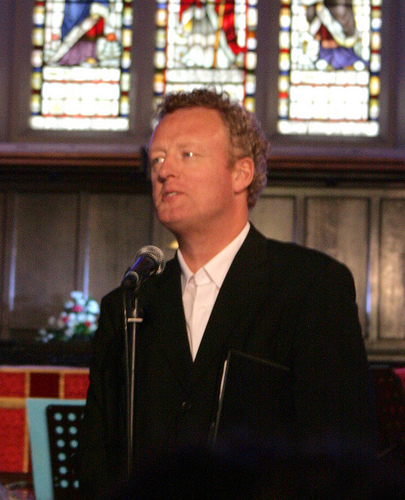
- Goodall at the Church of St John the Baptist in Barnstaple, Devon, May 2009

Background information
- Born: Howard Lindsay Goodall; 26 May 1958 (age 68); Bromley, Kent, England
- Occupations: Composer, presenter for television and radio (Classic FM - "Composer-in-Residence")
- Years active: 1979–present
- Spouse: Val Fancourt
- Howard Goodall's voice Recorded September 2013

Howard Lindsay Goodall (/ˈɡʊdɔːl/ GUUD-awl; born 26 May 1958) is an English composer of musicals, choral music and music for television. He also presents music-based programmes for television and radio, for which he has won many awards. In May 2008, he was named as a presenter and "Composer-in-Residence" with the UK radio channel Classic FM. In May 2009, he was named "Composer of the Year" at the Classic BRIT Awards.

== Early life ==
Born in Bromley, Kent, Goodall was educated at New College School, where he was a chorister in the Choir of New College, Oxford. He then went on to Stowe School and Lord Williams's School. He read music at Christ Church, Oxford, where he gained a first-class degree.

== Works ==
=== Popular music ===
In the late 1970s, Goodall was a member of the band Half Brother with his friend Jonathan Kermode. They produced an eponymous LP album, Half Brother, in 1978.

=== Musical theatre ===
Goodall's 1984 musical The Hired Man, an adaptation of the novel by Melvyn Bragg, won an Ivor Novello award (1985) and TMA Award (2006) award for Best Musical. Professional revivals of The Hired Man in recent years include a UK tour by the New Perspectives Theatre Company in 2008 and a production directed by David Thacker and Elizabeth Newman at the Octagon Theatre, Bolton in June 2010.

A Winter's Tale now known as A Summer's Tale, commissioned for the opening of the Sage Gateshead in December 2005 was presented during 2009/10 by Youth Music Theatre UK. In 2011 its London professional premiere at the Landor Theatre received the Offie for Best New Musical.

Love Story, based on the novella by Erich Segal, premiered in 2010 at the Minerva Theatre, Chichester.

Bend It Like Beckham: The Musical, written with Gurinder Chadha, Paul Mayeda Berges and Charles Hart began previewing at the Phoenix Theatre, London, in May 2015.

Other musicals include Girlfriends (1986), Days of Hope (1991), Silas Marner (1993), The Kissing-Dance (1998), The Dreaming (2001) (both with Charles Hart), A Winter's Tale (2005) and Two Cities (2006).

=== Television ===
Goodall has composed the main themes and incidental music for UK comedy programmes including Red Dwarf, Blackadder, Mr. Bean, The Thin Blue Line, The Vicar of Dibley, The Catherine Tate Show, 2point4 Children, Words and Pictures and QI, on which he has also appeared twice as a panellist. A single "Tongue Tied" from Red Dwarf reached no. 17 on the UK charts.

As an undergraduate at Christ Church, Oxford, Goodall met actor Rowan Atkinson and writer Richard Curtis, his collaborators on several of these projects, including his first break into TV, Not the Nine O'Clock News.

=== Choral works ===
Goodall has a body of choral music to his name, including "In Memoriam Anne Frank" (2001), "O Lord God of Time and Eternity" (2003) and settings of Psalm 23 (used as the theme tune to The Vicar of Dibley) and "Love Divine". In September 2008, his Eternal Light: A Requiem was premiered by Rambert Dance Company to choreography by the company's artistic director, Mark Baldwin. The result of a commission from London Musici to celebrate its 20th anniversary, Eternal Light: A Requiem was commissioned as both a choral-orchestral-dance piece and a choral orchestral work. The London premiere took place on 11 November 2008 at Sadler's Wells with Rambert Dance Company, London Musici, The Choir of Christ Church Cathedral, Oxford, Finchley Children's Music Group and soloists, conducted by Paul Hoskins. Also in September 2008, EMI Classics released the premiere recording of Eternal Light: A Requiem, with soloists Natasha Marsh, Alfie Boe and Christopher Maltman joining London Musici, The Choir of Christ Church Cathedral, Oxford, and conducted by Stephen Darlington. Eternal Light: A Requiem has now had over 700 live performances across the world.

In March 2009, Classic FM released Howard Goodall's Enchanted Voices, a modern exploration of ancient chant, scored for upper voices, cello, organ, handbells and synthesiser. The disc marks Goodall's position as Classic FM's Composer-in-Residence for 2009. A month after its UK release, it became the best-selling specialist choral CD of 2009. It subsequently earned a nomination for Classical Brit Album of the Year. Howard Goodall's Enchanted Voices was followed by Howard Goodall's Enchanted Carols (November 2009) and Pelican in the Wilderness (March 2010).

Goodall arranged an orchestral and choir score for Psalm 122 for Tonbridge School to commemorate their chapel which burnt down in the 1980s. Goodall was also commissioned by Truro Cathedral to write a new work for all four of the Cathedral's choirs: Truro Cathedral Choir (boys and men), St Mary's Singers (mixed adults), Cornwall Youth Choir and Cornwall Junior Choir. The piece, entitled A New Heart, A New Spirit, sets a text from Wisdom and Ezekiel in four languages (English, Latin, French and Cornish).

The 45-minute oratorio, Every Purpose Under the Heaven (The King James Bible Oratorio), was premiered in Westminster Abbey in November 2011 (conducted by the composer). It was commissioned as a gift to the United Church Schools Trust and United Learning Trust from Sir Ewan and Lady Harper, to mark the 400th anniversary of the King James Bible. Every Purpose Under the Heaven was recorded and released on the Decca Classics/Classics fm CD Inspired in 2012.

Goodall's commission Rigaudon was part of Queen Elizabeth II Diamond Jubilee Regatta and he was musically responsible for Rowan Atkinson's performance at the Opening Ceremony of the 2012 London Olympics.

I am Christmas Day premiered at Southwark Cathedral as part of the Mercy Ships Charity annual Carol Service on Wednesday 5 December 2012. Commissioned by Mercy Ships UK, the work was performed by Southwark Cathedral Girls Choir, conducted by the composer.

Goodall contributed two choral items for the August 4th commemoration of the beginning of the First World War at St Symphorien Military Cemetery near Mons, Belgium, broadcast live in BBC2. He arranged British and German soldiers' songs into a suite with band accompaniment (The Band of the Coldstream Guards) and composed an entirely new work in English and German, "Sure of the Sky, Sure of the Sun – Des Himmels sicher, der Sonne sicher", performed jointly by the London Symphony Chorus and the Schleswig-Holstein Festival Choir, conducted by Simon Halsey, based on the poems "May, 1915" by Charlotte Mew (1869–1928) and "An einen vermißten Freund!" by a German soldier killed in action on the Western Front, Goldfeld (discovered by Peter Appelbaum). Present at the event, alongside members of the UK Government, were the presidents of Germany and Ireland, the King and Queen of the Belgians, and Prince William and Catherine and Prince Harry.

Steadfast, with music and lyrics by Goodall, was released on 14 October 2014, in aid of Global's Make Some Noise, a charity that helps disadvantaged children in the UK. Steadfast included performance contributions from Katherine Jenkins, Laura Wright, Milos, Charlie Siem, Alfie Boe, Myleene Klass and Alexander Armstrong.

More Tomorrows was commissioned by Classic fm for Cancer Research UK and premiered by the Philharmonia Orchestra at the Royal Albert Hall on 25 April 2013, conducted by the composer.

Invictus: A Passion, a 55-minute work for soloists, chorus and small orchestra, was commissioned by St Luke's United Methodist Church in Houston, Texas, and premiered there under the composer's baton in March 2018, with the UK premiere following in May 2018, given by the Choir of Christ Church Cathedral, Oxford and Stephen Darlington.

Unconditional Love: A Cantata of Gratitude and Remembrance was commissioned by St Luke's United Methodist Church, Houston as a piece to reflect the world we were living in through the Covid-19 pandemic (premiered in Houston in 2021). St Luke's also commissioned Christmas Cantata which premiered again in Houston (Dec 2019) and both pieces are now having national premieres worldwide.

== Presenting ==
As well as presenting the BBC's Choir of the Year, Young Musician of the Year, Goodall was Classic FM's Composer-in-Residence and host of Saturday Night at the Movies for six years. Among many programmes, he has presented six award-winning series of television programmes on musical theory and history, filmed by Tiger Aspect and broadcast on Channel 4:

- Howard Goodall's Organworks (1996) – history of the organ
- Howard Goodall's Choirworks (1998) – history of choral music
- Howard Goodall's Big Bangs (2000) – pivotal events in the history of music (also a book, published by Vintage in 2001, ISBN 0-09-928354-9
- Howard Goodall's Great Dates (2002) – important dates in the history of music
- Howard Goodall's 20th Century Greats (2004) – exploring the divergence between classical and popular music in the 20th century
- Howard Goodall's How Music Works (2006) – analysing the fundamental components of music itself.
- The Truth About Christmas Carols (2008) – a documentary examining the surprising, and often secret, history of the traditional Christmas carol
- Hallelujah! The Story of Handel's Messiah (2010) – celebrates Handel's "Messiah" and looks at its origins and modern arrangements

Broadcast on BBC2:

- Howard Goodall's The Story of Music (2013) – traces the story of music from the ancient world to the modern day. The book accompanying this series has been translated into many languages.
- Sgt. Pepper's Musical Revolution (2017) – a 50th anniversary retrospective of the album's making by the Beatles and its impact, shown on both BBC2 and PBS on 3 June 2017.

Goodall received a Royal Television Society award for Organworks and the 2000 BAFTA Huw Wheldon award for Big Bangs, which also won several international prizes, including a Peabody Award.

Goodall was musical commentator for the V&A exhibition David Bowie Is in 2013, Diaghilev and the Ballets Russes in September 2010, and Pink Floyd: Their Mortal Remains in 2017.

== Personal life ==
He is married to Val Fancourt, who is a classical music agent, and they have two daughters.

== Discography ==
=== Television ===
Year	Title	Director(s)	Notes
1979–1982	Not the Nine O'Clock News	—N/a	28 episode
1983–1989	Blackadder	—N/a	24 episodes
1985–1986	ABC Weekend Special	—N/a	2 episodes
1987	CBS Schoolbreak Special	—N/a	Episode: "What If I'm Gay"
1987	Murder by the Book	Lawrence Gordon Clark	Television film
1988–2017	Red Dwarf	—N/a	73 episodes
1989	Carl Jung: Wisdom of the Dream	Stephen Segaller	—N/a
1990–1992	No Job for a Lady	—N/a	9 episodes
1990–1995	Mr. Bean	—N/a	15 episodes
1991	Bernard and the Genie	Paul Weiland	Television film
1992	A Time to Dance	Kevin Billington	—N/a
1992	The Borrowers	John Henderson	—N/a
1994-2020	The Vicar of Dibley	Dewi Humphreys (series 1-2), Gareth Carrivick (series 3), Barbara Wiltshire (lockdown episodes)	24 episodes
1995	The Last Englishman	John Henderson	Television film
1995–1996	The Thin Blue Line	—N/a	14 episodes
1997	Chalk	—N/a	12 episodes
1999	Blackadder: Back & Forth	Paul Weiland	Television short film
2002	The Gathering Storm	Richard Loncraine	—N/a
2002–present	Mr. Bean: The Animated Series	—N/a	143 episodes
2003–present	QI	—N/a	322 episodes
2003	The Adventure of English	Robert Bee; David Thomas	—N/a
2005	Shakespeare's Happy Endings	Stephen Leslie	—N/a
2005	The Catherine Tate Show	—N/a	Theme music composer
2009	Into the Storm	Thaddeus O'Sullivan	Emmy Award for Outstanding Music Composition for a Miniseries, Movie or a Special (Original Dramatic Score)
2009	Gigglebiz	Various	7 episodes
2010	Tweeines	Bella	186 episodes
2012–2015	Intresseklubben	—N/a	34 episodes
2013	The Spa	—N/a	7 episodes
2023–2024	Concordia	Barbara Eder	6 episodes

=== Film ===
Year	Title	Director	Notes
1997	Bean	Mel Smith	—N/a
2003	Johnny English	Peter Howitt	Theme music composer, main score composed by Edward Shearmur
2007	Mr. Bean's Holiday	Steve Bendelack	—N/a
2018	Johnny English Strikes Again	David Kerr	—N/a

== Awards ==
- Order of the British Empire

Goodall has been awarded honorary Doctorates of Music from Bishop Grosseteste University College in Lincoln, the University of Bolton, Mountview Academy of Theatre Arts with the University of East Anglia and Doctor of Literature (Education) from the Institute of Education, University College London. The British Academy of Songwriters, Composers and Authors (BASCA) gave him its Gold Badge Award for exceptional work in support of his fellow British composers. In 2007, he received the Making Music/Sir Charles Groves Prize for Outstanding Contribution to British Music and was appointed by the UK Government as England's first ever National Ambassador for Singing, leading a 4-year programme (Sing Up) to improve the provision of group singing for all primary-age children.

In April 2009, Goodall was nominated for The Classical BRITs "Composer of the Year" award for Eternal Light: A Requiem, which he won in May 2009, and in July 2009 he was nominated for an Emmy Award in the category "Outstanding Music Composition for a Miniseries, Movie, or Special (Dramatic Score)" for his work on the Winston Churchill biopic Into the Storm; which he went on to win on 12 September at a ceremony in Los Angeles.

In 2009, Goodall received the Karl Haas Prize for Music Education, awarded by the Klassix Society–Friends of 88.7KXMS / Fine Arts Radio International of Missouri Southern State University.

Additional awards include the Naomi Sergeant Memorial Award for Outstanding contribution to British Music, the MIA/Classic fm award for Outstanding contribution to Music Education and a Primetime Emmy Award for Original Dramatic Score for the score of the HBO film Into the Storm.

In January 2011, Goodall was appointed Commander of the Order of the British Empire (CBE) in the 2011 New Year Honours for services to music education.
