= Apoorva (given name) =

Apurv or Apurva is the common English spelling of two related Indian given names: the feminine अपूर्वा apūrvā and the masculine अपूर्व apūrva. The masculine name is often spelled Apurv or Apoorv, as in many modern Indo-Aryan languages it is pronounced without the vowel at the end, for example in Hindi: [ɐpuːrv]. The feminine name is spelled Apurva or Apoorva and is pronounced with the vowel at the end. In Sanskrit apūrva and apūrvā are respectively the masculine and feminine forms of the adjective meaning 'unprecedented', 'like none other', 'like never before', 'new', 'never seen before', 'one of a kind', 'rare', 'unique', 'exquisite', 'extraordinary'.

== List of people with the name ==
=== Masculine given name ===
- Apurva Asrani (born 1978), Indian film director
- Apurva Agnihotri (born 1972), Indian TV actor
- Apoorva Lakhia, Indian film director
- Apoorva D. Patel, Indian physicist
- Apoorva Sengupta (1938–2013), Indian army officer and cricketer

=== Feminine given name ===
- Apoorva Arora (born 1996), Indian actress and model
- Apoorva Muralinath (born 1989), Indian basketball player

=== Other ===
- Pratiksha Apurv (born 1964), Indian painter
