= Reuben (novel) =

1987 novel by John Edgar Wideman

- First edition
- Author: John Edgar Wideman
- Language: English
- Publisher: Henry Holt
- Publication date: 1987
- Publication place: United States
- Media type: Print (hardback)
- Pages: 215
- ISBN: 0-395-85730-9
- OCLC: 39045168

Reuben is a novel by the American writer John Edgar Wideman set in Pittsburgh, Pennsylvania during the 1980s.

The novel tells the story of Reuben, an aging African-American man who lives in an abandoned trailer, but is a lawyer and go-between on behalf of poor blacks in Homewood, a neighborhood of the East End.

== Sources ==
- Contemporary Authors Online. The Gale Group, 2005.
