= Two Cities (novel) =

1998 novel by John Edgar Wideman

- First edition
- Author: John Edgar Wideman
- Language: English
- Publisher: Houghton Mifflin
- Publication date: 1998
- Publication place: USA
- Media type: Print (hardback)
- Pages: 256
- ISBN: 0-395-85730-9
- OCLC: 39045168
- Preceded by: The Cattle Killing
- Followed by: God's Gym

Two Cities is a novel by the American writer John Edgar Wideman set in the Pennsylvania cities of Pittsburgh and Philadelphia during the 1990s. It was Wideman's 13th novel, published in 1998 by Houghton Mifflin.

== Plot ==
The novel tells the story of Kassima, a widow in mourning for her husband and two sons who died in the streets of Pittsburgh. Martin Mallory is Kassima's tenant, a photographer whose works depict the 50-year history of life in the African American neighborhoods of Pittsburgh and Philadelphia.
