= Half Brother (album) =

Studio album by Half Brother
- Released: 1978
- Studio: Scorpio Sound, London, England
- Genre: Pop rock
- Label: Ariola Hansa
- Producer: Del Newman

Singles from Half Brother
- 1. "Holding Hands With Love" Released: 1978

Half Brother is a vinyl LP record album by the band Half Brother. It is the first album by the BAFTA, Brit, Emmy, and Gramophone award-winning composer Howard Goodall.

The album was released by Ariola Hansa (AHAL 8002). It was recorded at Scorpio Sound studios, engineered by Richard Dodd. It was produced and arranged by Del Newman.

== Track listing ==
Side one

1. "You Never Tell Me" (Howard Goodall)
2. "Holding Hands With Love" (Jonathan Kermode)
3. "Love Too Short" (Howard Goodall)
4. "English Love Song" (Howard Goodall)
5. "Ain't No Rock 'n Roller" (Jonathan Kermode)
6. "Mama Says" (Howard Goodall)

Side two

1. "Don't Leave Me Alone" (Howard Goodall)
2. "Disko Donki" (Howard Goodall)
3. "Brigitte" (Howard Goodall)
4. "Hey Little Girl" (Jonathan Kermode)
5. "I Look In Your Eyes" (Jonathan Kermode, Dave Blackburn)

== Personnel ==
- Howard Goodall – vocals, keyboards
- Jon Kermode – vocals, keyboards
- John Mealing – keyboards
- Bill Kristian – bass guitar
- Alan Jones – bass guitar
- Paul Hart – bass guitar
- Brian Odgers – bass guitar
- Henry Spinetti – drums
- Frank Gibson – drums
- Les Davidson – guitar
- Alan Parker – guitar
- Richie Hitchcock – guitar
- Colin Green – guitar
- Laurence Juber – guitar
- Ray Cooper – percussion
