= Appoorva Muralinath =

Indian baseball player

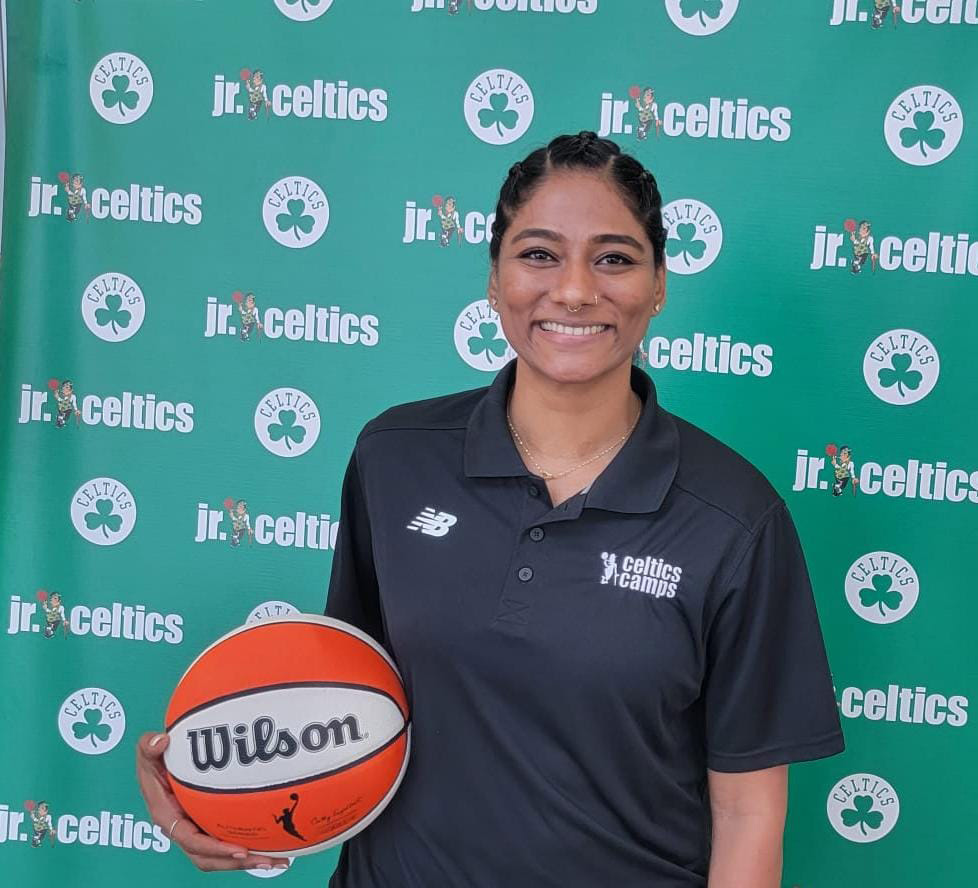
- Appoorva Muralinath

No. 22 – India
- Position: Power forward/center
- League: BFI

Personal information
- Born: Chennai, Tamil Nadu
- Listed height: 180 cm (5 ft 11 in)
- Listed weight: 83 kg (183 lb)

Appoorva Muralinath (born in Chennai, Tamil Nadu) is an Indian basketball player and coach. Her career as a player was from 2005 to 2017, and she played on the India women's national basketball team from 2010 to 2015. She is a power forward/center. She is the daughter of K. Muralinath who played for the Indian National Men's Basketball Team in the 1982 Asian Games. She is now the youth basketball coach for the Boston Celtics.

== General references ==
- R, Gopalakrishnan (18 January 2014). "9th Savio Cup 2014: Favourites ONGC (men) and Southern Railway crowned champions". Ekalavyas.
