= Apoorva Sagodharargal (soundtrack) =

1989 soundtrack album by Ilaiyaraaja

Soundtrack album by Ilaiyaraaja
- Released: 14 April 1989
- Recorded: 1988–1989
- Genre: Feature film soundtrack
- Length: 28:22
- Language: Tamil
- Label: Echo
- Producer: Ilaiyaraaja

Apoorva Sagodharargal is the soundtrack to the 1989 Tamil-language masala film of the same name directed by Singeetam Srinivasa Rao with Kamal Haasan leading an ensemble cast featuring Jaishankar, Nagesh, Gautami, Rupini, Manorama, Srividya, Janagaraj, Moulee, Delhi Ganesh and Nassar. The soundtrack featured six songs composed by Ilaiyaraaja, with lyrics written by Vaali. The dubbed Telugu and Hindi versions, Vichitra Sodarulu and Appu Raja, featured only five songs which are written by Prem Dhawan and Rajasri.

== Development ==
After his previous collaboration with Raja Paarvai (1981), Rao recruited Ilaiyaraaja to provide the musical score for Apoorva Sagodharargal and Vaali wrote the lyrics. According to Ilaiyaraaja, Haasan explained the particular situation in the story (regarding a marriage) to which Ilaiyaraaja composed the tune, but Haasan, despite liking the tune offered, was not overall satisfied. He then presented the song "Naan Paarthathile", composed by M. S. Viswanathan for Anbe Vaa (1966) and based on that Ilaiyaraaja composed the song "Puthu Maappillaikku". Haasan has stated that, after watching a performance at an Academy Awards ceremony, he wanted Ilaiyaraaja to compose a song like that; this resulted in adding the gibberish lines "bababa... bababari..." before the song's introduction.

The song "Unna Nenachen" was rewritten by Vaali five times until the sixth attempt satisfied Haasan. The song "Raja Kaiya Vachchaa" has two versions: one by Haasan, which was used in the film and in the audio cassette, and another sung by S. P. Balasubrahmanyam, which was included in the audio LP. The song was used as a place-holder for the originally intended track "Ammava Naan". This song was shot with Haasan and Gandhimathi (who was the initial choice for Haasan's foster mother) for 10 days, before being excluded from the film due to script changes. However, after its successful theatrical run, the song was included as an added attraction. The visuals of "Raja Kaiya Vachchaa" takes inspiration from the American film Grease (1978).

== Track listing ==
=== Tamil ===
All lyrics are written by Vaalee.

No.	Title	Singer(s)	Length
1.	"Raja Kaiya Vachchaa"	Kamal Haasan	4:56
2.	"Raja Kaiya Vachchaa" (Reprise)	S. P. Balasubrahmanyam	4:55
3.	"Puthu Maappillaikku"	S. P. Balasubrahmanyam, S. P. Sailaja	4:34
4.	"Unna Nenachen"	S. P. Balasubrahmanyam	4:38
5.	"Vaazhavaikum Kaathalukku Jey"	S. P. Balasubrahmanyam, S. Janaki	4:40
6.	"Annaaththe Aaduraar"	S. P. Balasubrahmanyam	4:39
Total length:			28:22

=== Telugu ===
All lyrics are written by Rajasri.

No.	Title	Singer(s)	Length
1.	"Raja Cheyyi Vesthe"	S. P. Balasubrahmanyam	4:50
2.	"Bujji Pelli Kodukki"	S. P. Balasubrahmanyam, S. P. Sailaja	4:32
3.	"Ninnu Thalachi"	S. P. Balasubrahmanyam	4:26
4.	"Vedi Vedi Aasalaku"	S. P. Balasubrahmanyam, K. S. Chithra	4:30
5.	"Aadedhi Nenura"	S. P. Balasubrahmanyam	4:28
Total length:			22:46

=== Hindi ===
All lyrics are written by Prem Dhawan.

No.	Title	Singer(s)	Length
1.	"Raja Naam Mera"	Kamal Haasan	4:50
2.	"Woh To Bana Apna"	S. P. Balasubrahmanyam, Asha Bhosle	4:32
3.	"Tune Saathi Paya Apna Jag Mein"	S. P. Balasubrahmanyam	4:25
4.	"Matwale Yaar Teri Jai"	S. P. Balasubrahmanyam, Asha Bhosle	4:30
5.	"Aaya Hai Raja"	S. P. Balasubrahmanyam	4:28
Total length:			22:45

== Reception ==
Khalid Mohamed of The Times of India described that, along with the visuals of P. C. Sreeram, Ilaiyaraaja's "ring-rang rock pop music score" served as the film's key contributor, Anand Kumar RS of The News Minute described the music as "fantastic" with the background score "just elevates the scenes by a few notches" and also complimented Vaali's lyrics. Rajesh Rajamani of HuffPost described "Raaja Kaiya Vachcha" as one of his "self-referential songs where he invokes the name Raaja (king), a monicker often used by fans"; the lyrics "raaja kaiya vachcha adhu wrong-ah ponadhilla" (transl. If Raja touches something, then it does not go wrong), often regard to his illustrious career, which, according to Rajamani, "had made his critics accuse him of extreme narcissism".

== Legacy ==
Following Vaali's death in 2013, The Hindu included "Unna Nenachen" among his best songs in their collection, "Best of Vaali: From 1964 – 2013". Roktim Rajpal of Deccan Herald also included "Unna Nenachen" as the best five songs sung by Balasubrahmanyam, which was published post his death in September 2020; Rajpal described it as "one of the finest sad songs of all time". "Annaaththe Aaduraar" was included as one of the "16 Tamil dance party songs" by The News Minute.

== In popular culture ==
The chorus of "Annatha Aadurar" was sampled in the song "Saroja Saman Nikalo" from Chennai 600028 (2007). In the same film, the emotional theme music from Apoorva Sagodharagal was humorously reused in a sequence where Gopi (Vijay Vasanth) loses his favorite cricket bat, after Sharks team's defeat in a betting cricket match with schoolchildren. This theme was remixed as the "Gopi Bat Theme" for the sequel, Chennai 600028 II (2016). In October 2020, Assamese musician sisters Antara and Ankita Nandy performed "Annatha Aadurar" as a tribute to Balasubrahmanyam.
