= Two Cities (musical) =

Two Cities is a 2006 stage musical by Howard Goodall based on the 1859 novel A Tale of Two Cities by Charles Dickens. The music and lyrics were written by Goodall, and the book was co-written by Goodall and Joanna Read.

Unlike the novel, which is set in the French Revolution, the musical is set in the 1917 Russian Revolution, and the "two cities" of the title are not London and Paris but rather London and Saint Petersburg. However, the underlying story is the same: a love triangle between the young Lucy Mannersly and the two men who fall in love with her, torn between their loyalties to her and to their native countries as they become caught up in the politics of the war-torn times they live in.

== Production ==
The musical first ran from 5 to 30 September 2006 at Salisbury Playhouse, Salisbury of which Read was the artistic director at the time. Though the possibilities of its transfer to the West End had been suggested, a series of negative reviews on its gala night meant no such transfer took place and as yet no revival performance has occurred. The original cast included Rosalie Craig as Lucy Mannersley, with Glyn Kerslake as Dr. Manislav; David Ricardo-Pearce as Sydney Carton and Ben Goddard as Yevgeny Irtenev.

== Development ==
Two Cities was the result of a partnership between Goodall and Read that had begun several years before in 2003, when Read staged a production of Goodall's musical The Hired Man, based on the novel by Melvyn Bragg. The production was a huge success and won a TMA Award for Best Musical. During its production, Goodall had hinted that he might be interested in writing a new song for the revival, a chance Read had "enthusiastically accepted", as Goodall said. After the success of the production, Goodall says he "would have been mad not to try and work with her again, this time on a new piece." The first piece Goodall suggested as source material for the musical was Cyrano de Bergerac, being a story about self-sacrifice for the sake of an unrequited love. However, Goodall had misgivings about taking this further, partly due to the impracticality of having to radio mike a singer with a prosthetic nose, and partly because he did not like Roxanne's self-centred decision to choose the "good-looking halfwit" Christian above Cyrano himself. Instead, they settled on a similar story of self-sacrifice, that of Charles Dickens' Sydney Carton.

The major departure from Dickens' novel was the decision to focus the story on the Russian Revolution of 1917 rather than the French Revolution of 1789–1799. Goodall claims he was worried that if he kept the story set during the French Revolution that it would begin to bear too much resemblance to the musical Les Misérables, so he made the alteration. He explained that the Russian Revolution is "roughly as close to our time as the storming of the Bastille was from Dickens'." Many other changes crept in during the development process, but Goodall affirms that "the underlying compassion of Dickens' story has been, I hope, faithfully retained."

There were also various changes made during the development of the musical. Originally, in contrast to the novel, Goodall was going to have Dr. Manislav locked up for sixteen years rather than eighteen, but in the final version of the musical this was changed. There were also several changes to the lyrics as things progressed. The original version of "The Night School of Subversion" was very different musically, having a much more upbeat, almost circus-esque sound, and actually never featured the lyric that was to become the song's title. Lucy originally had a solo song called "Gentleman One, Gentleman Two", but this was replaced with a different song, "Just Suppose".

== Synopsis ==
Prologue

The opening song, "Mirom Gospodu Pomolimsya", sung by the whole company, sets the scene before a church in St. Petersburg in 1895. Dr. Manislav is summoned to the scene by Yana, the old servant of the villainous Count Irtenev. The Count has raped a young girl and Manislav has been summoned to help her. Appalled at the way people turn a blind eye to such crimes just because the perpetrator is one of the nobility, Dr. Manislav speaks out against the injustice ("Testimony") but is simply arrested and locked up for trying to speak out against the ruling classes.

Act One

The scene changes to the East End of London eighteen years later, in 1913. The prostitutes Dulcie and Enid describe the squalor of the lives they lead ("On Petticoat Lane") when the rich young Lucy Mannersley emerges from a theatre with her ward and guardian, Peter Stryver. They bump into a friend of Stryver's, the lawyer Sydney Carton, who is familiar with Dulcie and Enid. Stryver tells Lucy that he has discovered that her father, Dr. Manislav, is still alive, in prison in St. Petersburg. Realising she must go and rescue him, Lucy prepares to set out for Russia with Stryver.

In St. Petersburg, the young student Kralena is thrown in prison for printing pamphlets inciting rebellion against the ruling classes. He vows that one day he shall see the workers take control, while Dr. Manislav, lying on the floor of the cell, reflects again on the injustice of his being silenced for trying to do the right thing ("One Day...") Lucy arrives with Stryver and arranges for her father's release, though Manislav seems to be delirious and doesn't recognise her. Kralena curses the aristocratic airs and graces of people like Lucy, and once they have gone, he again sings of how he shall one day seize power ("One Day...Reprise"). At the docks, a young peasant girl named Natalya sells her wares to the passing strangers, many of whom ignore her ("Departures"). However, one individual buys a locket from her. This man is Yevgeny Irtenev, the son of Count Irtenev. He explains to Yana that he has to leave to escape the anger of the working classes and says goodbye to her ("Irtenev and Yana's Farewell"). Lucy and Stryver, meanwhile, are having trouble with customs officials. Irtenev, posing as an Englishman named Edward Ireton, helps them to get past and onto the ship.

As the ship sets sail back to England, Lucy sings to her father, trying to calm him in his absent, delirious state. Yevgeny/Edward and the whole company join in the song as they will the boat on towards England ("West and Safety Bound.") Lucy later speaks to Edward on the boat, and he expresses fear about going to a strange place he does not know. Edward is then approached by a Russian woman named Tatiana, who tries to sell him counterfeit gems and precious jewels from his homeland of Russia, but Edward refuses to give in to such temptation ("Precious Matryoshkas.") The boat eventually arrives at the docks in Harwich, where Lucy again tries to comfort her father by singing ("West and Safety Bound Reprise.") Meanwhile, Tatiana reports Edward to a policeman, claiming he is a Russian spy. Edward pleads his innocence, but is taken away. Lucy resolves to help him.

Meanwhile, in Russia, Kralena arrives at an abandoned warehouse, where two of the Communist revolutionaries, Alexei and Sergei, welcome him to their dark world ("The Night School of Subversion,") asking him if he has what it takes. In the courtroom back in England, Sydney Carton arrives to defend Edward, apparently suffering from a dreadful cold. He questions Tatiana as to how she could be so certain that Edward was the man she thought he was, and she confesses not to know exactly what the spy she was looking for looks like. Throwing off his disguise, Sydney demonstrates that he bears an uncanny resemblance to Edward, thereby proving that it was easy for Tatiana to be mistaken in her assumption. Edward is released. Back in Russia, Alexei and Sergei take Kralena to the home of the local Police sergeant and urge him to blow the house up. Kralena is horrified but eventually does the horrific deed. Gleefully, the two revolutionaries welcome him to their movement ("The Night School of Subversion Reprise.") After the trial back in England, Lucy is very thankful to Sydney, and he feels an affection for her, but sees her obvious preference for Edward. Going home, Sydney sings sadly of the wasted life he has led pursuing women and always drinking, reflecting on the bleakness of his future. In St. Petersburg, Kralena joins the song, singing of how horrified he is at what he is done ("At the Last Trumpet.")

The next day at Dr. Manislav's house, Sydney arrives to help Manislav arrange his will. When Manislav hears that Edward's real name is Irtenev, he becomes delirious again and goes into a sort of fit. Sydney helps him and leads him outside. Left alone with Lucy, Edward confesses his feelings for her, and asks her to marry him. With time suddenly frozen, Lucy sings alone, imagining her life with Edward and weighing up the choice in her mind ("Just Suppose.") However, before she can tell Edward her decision, Sydney returns and breaks the tension. In Russia, meanwhile, Count Irtenev speaks to Yana, claiming that the talk of a revolution is just ridiculous rumours that will never come to fruition. He also expresses his deep disappointment in his son for fleeing the country. Back in England, Dr. Manislav plays chess with Stryver and explains his disapproval of the relationship between Lucy and Edward. Stryver sings back at him, making a case that they should not blame Edward for his father's faults ("Bad Blood.")

Back again at the Irtenev estate, Count Irtenev catches a young, starving boy stealing from him and orders him to be thrown in the lake. The final scene is all enacted through the song "Angelica, Arkangel", sung by the whole company. Edward tells Lucy his memories of childhood, while Sydney sings with Dulcie, eventually deciding to give up his self-pity and move to Australia where he can find a new life. Dr. Manislav and Stryver again sing together of the "bad blood" inherent in Edward. Lucy marries Edward and Kralena instigates a revolution, culminating in the execution of rich nobles such as Count Irtenev.

Act Two

In the streets of St. Petersburg in 1917, Kralena leading the people in revolution and smashing the world of the old elite ("A New Russia.") In England, Edward and Lucy are now married and have a daughter, Lily. Edward receives news from Yana telling of how his father has been killed and the revolutionaries have taken control. He tells Lucy that he must return to Russia to help. Kralena, meanwhile, has seized the Irtenev estate as his headquarters and sings "One Day...Reprise" as they capture Yana and force her to be their slave.

Enid and Dulcie now sing and welcome us to the coastal resort of Paradise Sands ("On Paradise Sands,") singing of how soldiers come here on leave for a brief taste of happiness. Lucy and Stryver, who has been blinded fighting in the War, arrive and Lucy speaks bitterly of Edward's decision to return to Russia, claiming that "that country robs me of my family." On a Baltic ferry towards Russia, Edward sings of his fears of what he may find when he returns home. Lucy, meanwhiles, bumps into Sydney on a train, who has come back to England to fight in the War. Joining in the song, Sydney confesses the love he has held for Lucy since he met her. She tells him that she is flattered, but cannot feel the same way, as she is married and has a daughter. As the song reaches its climax, Edward returns home to find the place a hellish nightmare, and Sydney and Lucy kiss ("Home.") They are disturbed by the arrival of Clusper, a major who knows Sydney. When Lucy has gone, Sydney decides to help Lucy in whatever way he can and asks Clusper to get him shipped out to Russia so he can rescue Edward for her.

Edward arrives on the Irtenev estate and is immediately captured by Kralena and his men. He tries to plead his case that he is just a traveler, but when they threaten to kill Yana he confesses that he is indeed the son of Count Irtenev ("Capture.") Back at the English seaside, Lucy expresses concern for Edward, but Stryver stops her, telling her that he is sorry for all the times in the past that he upset or offended her. Meanwhile, the revolutionaries put Edward on trial ("Trial & Testimony.") He claims to be innocent, though Tatiana appears and levels accusations at him of being a foreign spy. Kralena summons the priest who was there when Dr. Manislav wrote his testimony, and reads it out as the words of Dr. Manislav explain the crimes of Edward's father. Condemned by Manislav's words, Edward despairs as he is led away to the old slaughter house to await execution.

Sydney arrives in St. Petersburg and pleads with the officer in charge to let him go into the city and find Edward. However, the officer forbids it, saying he must stay in the British Consulate and be on a troop ship in the morning. However, another soldier, Barker, feels sorry for Sydney, and agrees to lead him to the slaughter house to find his friend. Stopping outside the ruined church, Sydney encounters Yana, caring for an injured young boy, as the company sings "Resurrection and Life." Back in England, Lucy asks her father to tell her about her childhood in Russia. Dr. Manislav refuses, saying that that life is far behind them and they must move on ("Fairy Tales and Ghosts.")

Sydney and Barker arrive at the slaughter house, where Edward and Natalya are kept prisoner. While Barker and the guard stay outside drinking, Sydney gets Natalya to help him switch clothes with Edward. Delirious, Edward barely recognises Sydney and leaves in a daze as the drunken Barker leads him out, believing him to be Sydney and taking him towards the troop ship. Left alone with Natalya, Sydney confesses that for the first time he feels he has done something honourable. Natalya sings to Sydney and explains her own tragic story ("The Sorrow of my Fate"). As the guards arrive to take Sydney to execution, he sings a reprise of "Home" that is taken up by the whole company as he is led away to be killed and Edward returns home to his wife and daughter.

== Musical numbers ==
Act One

- Mirom Gospodu Pomolimsya – Full Company
- Testimony – Dr. Manislav, Yana, Priest & Company
- On Petticoat Lane – Dulcie, Enid & Company
- One Day... – Kralena & Dr. Manislav
- One Day... (Reprise) – Kralena
- Departures – Natalya
- Irtenev & Yana's Farewell – Yevgeny/Edward & Yana
- West and Safety Bound – Lucy, Yevgeny/Edward & Company
- Precious Matryoshkas – Tatiana & Yevgeny/Edward
- West and Safety Bound (Reprise) – Lucy & Company
- The Night School of Subversion – Alexei, Sergei & Kralena
- The Night School of Subversion (Reprise) – Alexei, Sergei & Kralena
- At the Last Trumpet – Sydney & Kralena
- Just Suppose – Lucy
- Bad Blood – Dr. Manislav & Stryver
- Angelica, Arkangel – Yevgeny/Edward, Lucy, Yana, Sydney, Dulcie, Dr. Manislav, Stryver, Kralena, Natalya & Company

Act Two

- A New Russia – Full Company
- One Day... (Reprise) – Kralena
- On Paradise Sands – Enid, Dulcie & Company
- Home – Yevgeny/Edward, Sydney & Lucy
- Capture – Yakov, Kralena, Raina, Vassily, Yevgeny/Edward & Yana
- Tribunal & Testimony – Kralena, Sergei, Vassily, Yakov, Raina, Yevgeny/Edward, Tatiana, Priest & Dr. Manislav
- Resurrection and Life (Vokresenya i zhizni) – Full Company
- Fairy Tales and Ghosts – Lucy & Dr. Manislav
- The Sorrow of my Fate – Natalya & Sydney
- Home (Reprise) – Sydney, Natalya, Edward, Lucy, Dr. Manislav & Company

== Characters ==
- Lucy Mannersly – the central figure of the musical, an aristocratic young woman who goes to Russia to save her father and is bound by her loyalty to her family.
- Dr. Manislav – Lucy's father, a kind and gentle-hearted man, but haunted by his memories of the past.
- Sydney Carton – the womanising and alcoholic lawyer who discovers his salvation through his love for Lucy, for which he is willing to sacrifice himself.
- Edward Ireton/Yevgeny Irtenev – the son of Count Irtenev who flees Russia to make a new life for himself with Lucy, but returns when he hears of the political upheaval.
- Kralena – the leader of the Communist revolutionaries, at first horrified by the concept of violence but soon becoming ruthless in his pursuit of power.
- Peter Stryver – Lucy's guardian and Dr. Manislav's friend. He is often a voice of reason, but can also be insensitive at times.
- Yana – an old servant of the Count and Yevgeny's only childhood friend. Her suffering spurs him to return to Russia.
- Natalya – a young Russian peasant girl living in poverty and sentenced to death by the violent revolutionaries.
- Tatiana – a Russian woman in need of money, resorting to forgery and deception to save herself from ruin.
- Dulcie & Enid – two prostitutes who live in the East End of London
- Alexei and Sergei – two of the leading revolutionaries who initiate Kralena
- Priest – present when Dr. Manislav makes his testimony
- Count Irtenev – the villainous noble whose crimes incite Manislav's anger against social injustice.
- Clusper – a major in the British Army who is friends with Sydney
- Barker – a soldier stationed in St. Petersburg who helps Sydney rescue Yevgeny
- Digby Jones – the officer in charge of the British Consulate in St. Petersburg
- Yakov, Vassily & Raina – three of the revolutionaries under Kralena
- Purser of the ship from St. Petersburg to Harwich
- Judge of the court case against Yevgeny Irtenev
- Brewyer the lawyer who prosecutes Yevgeny
- Customs Officers at the St. Petersburg docks
- Guard of the prison in St. Petersburg
- Sailor on the boat from St. Petersburg to Harwich
- Policeman who arrests Yevgeny
- Boy who is caught stealing from the Count
- Lily, daughter of Lucy and Yevgeny/Edward

== Reception ==
Two Cities opened to very mixed reviews on its opening run. Most of the reviews from the press, such as from The Times and The Guardian were quite negative. The Times critic found the acting and singing uninspiring, but found most grievances with the musical itself, feeling that it was, despite the change of setting, strikingly similar to Les Misérables, even down to the nature of some of the songs. The Guardian reviewer wrote "But Goodall's music, although often beautiful and sometimes clever – particularly in the way that much of the second-act music mirrors the first – lacks any big numbers, and Read's book and production lack any impetus at all."

A West End transfer never occurred. As yet, there has been no revival of the musical.

Several members of the original cast went immediately into shows in the West End, with Nicola Sloane, who played Yana, and Paul Kemble, who played Alexei, Clusper and Barker, getting the roles of Frau Schmitt and Franz in Andrew Lloyd Webber's production of Rodgers and Hammerstein's The Sound of Music, and Rosalie Craig, who played Lucy, going on to play Arwen in the London premiere of the stage musical based on J.R.R. Tolkien's The Lord of the Rings.

== Original cast ==
The original cast for the musical:

- Dr. Manislav – Glyn Kerslake
- Lucy Mannersly – Rosalie Craig
- Yevgeny Irtenev/Edward Ireton – Ben Goddard
- Sydney Carton – David Ricardo-Pearce
- Kralena – Chris Thatcher
- Peter Stryver – Oliver Beamish
- Yana – Nicola Sloane
- Enid/Natalya – Emily Butterfield
- Dulcie/Raina – Laura Checkly
- Tatiana – Mary Doherty
- Sergei/Customs Officer/Guard – Guy Oliver-Watts
- Alexei/Clusper/Barker – Paul Kemble
- Priest/Count Irtenev/Digby Jones – Stefan Bednarczyk
- Yakov/Purser/Brewyer – David Ashley
- Vassily/Sailor/Policeman – Chris Grierson
- Child Actors – Emily Arnold, Freya Stevens, Will Wheeler, Oliver Malam, Daisy Billinge, Rosie Bibby and Antigone Lovering.
