= Half Brother (band) =

English pop rock band

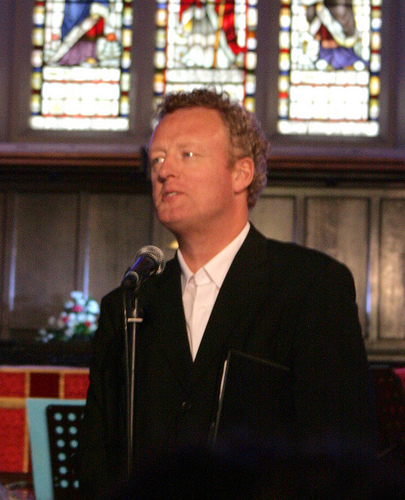
Howard Goodall, member of Half Brother.

Half Brother was an English pop rock band in the late 1970s, consisting of two half brothers, Howard Goodall and Jonathan Kermode.

Howard Goodall first conceived the band at the age of 15. He went on to be a composer of musicals, choral music, and music for television, as well as presenting music-based programmes for television and radio, for which he has won a number of awards.

== Members ==
The main members of the band were:

- Howard Goodall – keyboards & vocals
- Jonathan Kermode – keyboards & vocals

Additional notable musicians who played with the band included:

- Ray Cooper – percussion
- Frank Gibson – drums
- Laurence Juber – guitar
- John Mealing – keyboards
- Alan Parker – guitar
- Henry Spinetti – drums

== Discography ==
Albums

- Half Brother (LP) – Ariola Hansa (AHAL 8002) – 1978

Singles

- "Holding Hands With Love" (7") – Ariola Hansa (AHA 515) – 1978
- "Hideaway" (7", Single) – Ariola Hansa (AHA 534) & Hansa International (100 443-100) – 1979
