= Brothers and Keepers =

1984 memoir by John Edgar Wideman

- Author: John Edgar Wideman
- Language: English
- Genre: Memoir
- Publisher: Holt, Rinehart and Winston
- Publication date: 1984

Brothers and Keepers is a memoir written by John Edgar Wideman. It was published by Holt, Rinehart and Winston in 1984.

== Plot summary ==
Two brothers, Afro-Americans, John and Robert, grew up together in the same neighborhood in Homewood. But they lived very different lives. On November 15, 1975, the author's younger brother, Robert, was involved in a botched robbery that left a man dead. Being unemployed and in need of money to buy heroin he and his friends tried to steal a truck load of stolen TV sets. One of his accomplices shot the fence and who was trying to run away. Wanted for armed robbery and murder, Robert and his accomplices ran for three months. Suddenly Robert turns up at John's house in Laramie and stays overnight. He was arrested by the police the next day. John was a writer and taught literature and creative writing at the University of Wyoming at that time. As John got involved with them, he became a suspect in the police. Robert, a junkie, drug dealer and thief was eventually sentenced to life in a Pittsburgh prison with no chance of parole, even though it wasn't him who shot the man. During his time in prison Robert is frequently visited by his brother John. Robert writes and talks to him about his experiences in the prison. He also studied for a college degree while in prison.

According to Lionel Mandy there are "at least two books within these covers". The first is a "biographical family portrait of the Widemans and their forebears", while the "second book concerns the prison and the larger society within which it exists."

== Style ==
The New York Times says that "by combining his [the author's] own literary skill with the candor and vitality of his brother's street style, Mr. Wideman gives added power and dimension to this book about the contrary values and goals of two brothers. It is a rare triumph in its use of diverse linguistic styles". He "uses an impressive array of literary skills" and "convincingly mimes the rhythms and style of the Depression writings of Carl Sandburg and Margaret Walker."

== Reception ==
The book was a finalist for the National Book Critics Circle Award in 1984. The New York Times describes the book as a "gripping account of the events, social pressures and individual psychological responses that led his brother Robert to prison for murder and him [the author] to a middle-class life as a professor of English", as well as "a sensitive and intimate portrayal of the lives and divergent paths taken by two brothers". It is furthermore described as a "source of some powerfully written scenes in which he conveys his impressions of American prisons", especially the experiences with the guards, "the Keepers", who degrade the prisoners as well as their guests. He has "succeeded brilliantly in both understanding his brother's life and coming to terms with his own." Kirkus Reviews describes the book as having a "powerful initial grab [...], but only sporadic flickers of drama and insight amid the narrative convolutions."

Published in 1985 in the UK by Allison and Busby, the book was described by Edward Blishen in The Guardian as a "brilliant and most moving attempt by John Edgar Wideman, black American novelist and academic, to write his brother out of a merciless prison sentence."

Brothers and Keepers was frequently quoted in Didier Eribon's 2018 book Returning to Reims.
