= D. Quentin Miller =

D. Quentin Miller (born 1967) is a professor of the English language and literature at Suffolk University in Boston. He earned his B.A. from Boston College in 1989, his M.A. from the College of William and Mary in 1990, and his Ph.D. from the University of Connecticut in 1996.

== Published works ==
He is the author or editor of a number of textbooks and critical studies of American literature, including:

- The Compact Bedford Introduction to Literature (co-edited with Michael Meyer), New York: Macmillan (13th edition, 2020)
- James Baldwin in Context (edited volume), Cambridge University Press (2019)
- Understanding John Edgar Wideman, Columbia, South Carolina: U of South Carolina Press (2018)
- American Literature in Transition 1980-1990 (edited volume), Cambridge: Cambridge University Press (2018)
- The Routledge Introduction to African American Literature London: Routledge (2016)
- 'A Criminal Power': James Baldwin and the Law Columbus, Ohio: The Ohio State University Press (2012)
- Connections: Literature for Composition (co-edited with Julie Nash), Boston: Houghton Mifflin (2008)
- The Heath Anthology of American Literature (co-edited with Paul Lauter et al.), Boston: Cengage (6th edition: 2010)
- Prose and Cons: New Essays on U.S. Prison Literature (edited volume), Jefferson, NC: McFarland (2005)
- The Generation of Ideas, Boston: Wadsworth/Cengage (2005)
- John Updike and the Cold War, Missouri University Press (2001)
- Re-viewing James Baldwin: Things Not Seen (edited volume), Philadelphia: Temple University Press (2000)
