= Grange Hill series 3 =

Season of television series

Grange Hill
- Season 3
- No. of episodes: 16

Release
- Original network: BBC One
- Original release: 8 January – 29 February 1980

Season chronology
- ← Previous; Series 2 Next → Series 4

The third series of the British television drama series Grange Hill began broadcasting on 8 January 1980, before ending on 29 February 1980 on BBC One. The series follows the lives of the staff and Students of the eponymous school, an inner-city London comprehensive school. It consists of sixteen episodes.

== Cast and characters ==
=== Students ===
- Todd Carty as Tucker Jenkins
- George Armstrong as Alan Humphries
- Michelle Herbert as Trisha Yates
- Terry Sue-Patt as Benny Green
- Robert Craig-Morgan as Justin Bennett
- Vincent Hall as Michael Doyle
- Donald Waugh as Joseph Hughes
- Paul McCarthy as Tommy Watson
- Lindy Brill as Cathy Hargreaves
- Linda Slater as Susi McMahon
- Mark Eadie as Andrew Stanton
- Sheila Chandra as Sudhamani Patel
- Vinny Mann as Antoni Karamanopolis
- Lesley Woods as Madelin Tanner
- Ruth Davies as Penny Lewis
- Kim Benson as Mary Johnson
- Peter Moran as Pogo Patterson
- Mark Baxter as Duane Orpington
- Joanne Boakes as Anita Unsworth
- Carey Born as Karen Stanton
- Amanda Mealing as Tracy Edwards
- Mark Farmer as Gary Hargreaves

=== Teachers ===
- Graham Ashley as Mr Garfield
- Michael Cronin as Mr Geoff Baxter
- Robert Hartley as Mr Keating
- James Wynn as Mr Graham Sutcliffe
- Brian Capron as Mr Stuart Hopwood
- Lucinda Gane as Miss Terri Mooney
- Susan Porrett as Mrs Hilary Thomas
- Cheryl Branker as Miss Peterson
- Neville Barber as Mr John Curtis
- Penny Brownjohn as Miss Miles
- Nickola Sterne as Mrs Kennedy
- Susan Field as Miss Parsons

== Episodes ==
No.	Episode	Writer	Director	Original airdate
1	Episode One	Phil Redmond	Brian Lennane	8 January 1980
Tucker & co are late on the first day when the bus doesn't turn up. Mr Sutcliffe helps lay signs around the school for the new first formers. Benny turns up with football in one hand, and little brother in the other. Andrew Stanton is accompanied by his sister, Karen: he is overprotective, but she would rather be independent. Sudhanami Patel turns up with uniform, but her classmates are now casually dressed. Penny's know-all hauteur gets up the nose of Trisha. Tucker and Alan seem to be as lost as the first years. Mr Sutcliffe falls out with the caretaker over the arrows supposed to help new Students. In the new Miss Peterson's class, Cathy's jeans don't meet with approval. Tucker's mates tell him he must finish his holiday assignment, even though it is not needed till Friday. Duane's bike goes missing. First appearances: Miss Peterson, Tracey Edwards, Duane Orpington, Anita Unsworth, Miss Terri Mooney, Karen Stanton, Michael Green, Douglas 'Pogo' Patterson, Sally Forsyth, Jenny Yates and others. Tommy Watson returns.
2	Episode Two	Phil Redmond	Brian Lennane	11 January 1980
Duane turns up with a black eye, given by his dad as a result of his lost bike. With school maintenance going on, the window putty proves irresistible. The drama class starts. Duane's long-term friendship with Tracey seems to be crumbling under peer pressure. Pogo's putty removal causes some headaches for the school maintenance man. Pogo accidentally spills some red paint over Duane's jacket. Tracey repairs the rift in their friendship by sorting out Duane's paint problem.
3	Episode Three	Phil Redmond	Jackie Willows	15 January 1980
Justin is given the bumps on his birthday. The third form wants a common room for lunch and breaks. A school trip to some waste ground inspires Penny and Susi to ask if they can go to the proper countryside. Susi has bra troubles. Alan, with Andrew, and witnessed by Susi leaves a fire burning, but a chain of kids put it out using milk churns. Susi throws her bra in the river, but Andrew retrieves it, and there's a mutual agreement between them to keep quiet about what each other has seen. First appearance: Mr 'Hoppy' Hopwood
4	Episode Four	Phil Redmond & Margaret Simpson	Jackie Willows	18 January 1980
A new school council rep is elected. The students still are thinking about the countryside, and want a regular trip. Cathy flirts with the decorator. Trish is pushed into becoming a school rep. Tucker starts a fire in Chemistry. Tempers flare between Trisha, Cathy, and Penny. Doyle and Trisha, and Mark and Penny are proposed from the each class. Doyle's proposed policies are all stolen from other candidates. Trisha & Penny fight until Miss Peterson intervenes. Doyle wins but both Trisha and Penny are beaten by an outsider.
5	Episode Five	Phil Redmond & Margaret Simpson	Brian Lennane	22 January 1980
Duane's bike seems to have resurfaced as owned by another Student. Madelin Tanner is seen behaving suspiciously. The first formers are told their project is to collect insects. A meeting is held about the school magazine: censorship rears its ugly head. Another bike goes missing. Pogo holds an insect race, but the contestants escape. Sally Forsyth takes a tumble during Miss Peterson's obstacle course, and rumours spread that she has died. More bikes go missing.
6	Episode Six	Phil Redmond	Brian Lennane	25 January 1980
It's a case of too many cooks spoil the broth when it comes to catching the bike thieves, but perhaps Tucker will save the day. Tracy sees Mr. Sutcliffe and Miss Mooney holding hands outside a jewellers shop. Sally is visited in hospital by Jenny, Tracey and Karen. Final appearance: Sally Forsyth
7	Episode Seven	Phil Redmond & Margaret Simpson	Jackie Willows	29 January 1980
A new girl, Fatima, enrols at the school, but speaks no English, and the staff naively assume that Sudhamani speaks her native language. Fatima has difficulties fitting into the school, but is taught useful phrases by Cathy and Trisha, including "Shut yer Mouf". The school fair looms and Tucker has plans to get a teacher wet. An accident in Chemistry makes Trisha re-evaluate her stand against school uniform. Sudhamani's dad is upset at her Western friends, and decides he would like her moved to an all-girls school. Can Trisha and Cathy persuade him that Sudhamani is not being corrupted?
8	Episode Eight	Phil Redmond	Jackie Willows	1 February 1980
Doyle is abusing his position on school council by taking bribes. Mr Hopwood has arranged for a hut to be rented for outdoor activities on a nearby farm, but transport seems to be a problem. The First form has a mime lesson, but it is interrupted by Mr Garfield setting up lunch tables. Pogo is obnoxious in Cookery, so the girls teach him a lesson. Because the lunch is delayed, Pogo gets his first stab at a business venture, selling Duane's cakes to starving students. Pogo and Duane are mugged after the second day's cake sale, but Mr Sutcliffe intervenes. Although the staff aren't happy about Pogo's venture, it prompts them to start the official tuck shop, using Pogo and Duane as helpers – but with a detention and essay thrown in for good measure.
9	Episode Nine	Phil Redmond	Brian Lennane	5 February 1980
Sutcliffe and Mooney seem to be having a lover's tiff, which pleases Cathy no end. Mr Hopwood is not pleased to find virtually no-one's come to the meeting about the outdoor centre – Doyle is blamed for doing nothing. Penny and Susi are determined to show how useless Doyle is as a council rep. They type a short piece for the school magazine, which is accepted at the last moment. The "Trading Post" makes a start with its hungry customers and sells out. Doyle finds out about the school magazine and confronts Penny, but she is rescued by Alan who has evidently taken a shine to Susi. The staff aren't amused by Penny's comments, worried because Doyle's father is on the council. All magazines are rounded up, and this annoys Andrew Stanton and Justin Bennett.
10	Episode Ten	Phil Redmond	Brian Lennane	8 February 1980
Andrew's parents seem to be having marital strife again. Andrew gets paint over his trousers. A tug of war between staff and Students is planned. The meeting to discuss the outdoor centre has a lot more people this time. Penny realises she can use Susi to promote her anti-Doyle campaign. Fundraising is started for the outdoor centre, including a sponsored walk. Alan takes Tucker's two 50-pence pieces, and a small battle begins which ends up with Tucker lobbing a water bomb at Baxter accidentally. Benny tries for the District Team, and shows off his stuff in the trials, but is handicapped by not being a Brookdale boy. Mr Wainwright is thwarted when the teams reorganise themselves to show off Benny and the other boys in a more prominent position. Benny is chosen, but gives him a dilemma that his first match conflicts with one against Rodney Bennett.
11	Episode Eleven	Phil Redmond	Brian Lennane	12 February 1980
Pogo has an argument with Karen, in Woodwork, and he breaks her toast rack. Karen hires some help, who ambush him and remove his trousers. Tucker, Benny and Alan shortcut Mr Baxter's cross country run by using a bus. Mr Baxter reconciles with Benny and cancels his detention. Enough money has been raised for the outdoor centre, but who will win the tug of war?
12	Episode Twelve	Phil Redmond & Alan Janes	Brian Lennane	15 February 1980
At half term, Alan ropes in Tucker and Benny to help with measuring timber, but they are scuppered by one of Alan's Dad's workmen. At the weekend, Duane and Benny's brother, Michael, plan to enter a competition to win a van for the outdoor centre. While the boys are hiding from Alan's dad, they take an accidental trip in the truck and uncover some copper being stolen. Tracy finds her mum is racist when Michael comes round, so instead they use the school, which is closed of course. Mr Keating finds them, but they get off lightly. They cook a plan to collect old papers from the paper round. Alan's dad finds out about the copper tubing and sets out a plan to follow the thieves. As a reward, Alan's dad gives £25 to the school's outdoor project.
13	Episode Thirteen	Phil Redmond	Brian Lennane	19 February 1980
Alan's Dad offers some help to Mr Hopwood. Tracey, Duane and Michael face Mr Keating's interrogation, and Tracey comes clean. Alan seems to have a mystery assignment in the afternoon, and Tucker is determined to find out what it is. Doyle vandalises Justin's woodwork, but Tucker locks him in the cupboard. Susi seems reluctant to leave school. Tucker finds out that Alan's doing Judo, and is thrown by him by demonstration. Susi seems interested in the Judo class. Mr Hopwood finds a minibus at Alan's Dad's yard, and bends his arm to strike a deal. Susi is bullied into helping Jill Harcourt with her homework. Alan rescues Susi outside the changing room, but she isn't quite ready to let him help her. The local paper is impressed by Tracey's gang's attempt at the competition, and wants to interview them; but the article ends up rather disappointing. Alan proposes extra Judo tuition to Susi.
14	Episode Fourteen	Phil Redmond & Alan Janes	Jackie Willows	22 February 1980
The first trip to the outdoor centre in the newly acquired van. The third formers set up camp, and Alan takes off Susi for some judo practice. Tucker strikes up a deal with Justin. The boys set up the girls tent on an ants nest. Cathy ignores advice to go upstairs in the derelict building, and trips up over a rotting floorboard. She is carted off to hospital, but the damaged building raises doubts that the outdoor centre may be too derelict. Jill Harcourt's handwriting is arousing suspicion in Mr Sutcliffe. Alan takes his dad on an unofficial visit to assess the outdoor centre, but Mr Hopwood catches them there. Alan's dad is more optimistic than the school council, and promises a low estimate. Susi's Judo floors Jill Harcourt, and Alan is rewarded with a kiss for his efforts, to the glee of Tucker.
15	Episode Fifteen	Phil Redmond & Alan Janes	Roger Singleton-Turner	26 February 1980
Tucker, Alan and Hughsey mess around at the shopping centre. Trouble seems to be brewing between Brookdale and Grange Hill. Baxter guards the school entrance, and notes Students arriving with injuries. A series of dares begins, each getting more and more dangerous. Are Trisha and Cathy really extorting money from the first formers? Tucker makes use of the back entrance, selling its usage to other third formers. The precinct is made out of bounds. Sutcliffe catches Cathy and Trisha in the shopping precinct – but he can't be angry at their reason for being there. Meanwhile at the same time Tucker is pushed into the precinct's fountain as part of a dare. Antoni Karamanopolis takes a daring walk on the car park wall, is this one dare too far? Final appearance: Antoni Karamanopolis, Mr Garfield and Tracy Edwards
16	Episode Sixteen	Phil Redmond	Roger Singleton-Turner	29 February 1980
Penny's magazine contribution is being done through Susi. Tucker has ideas on using the school's video recorder. Cathy's having problems with her periods. Tucker's chair-knocking game falls foul of the cleaners. The Outdoor centre is vetoed in the council meeting, which seems to please Doyle. The option of sharing an outdoor centre with Brookdale is proposed by Tucker. Miss Peterson gives Doyle some grief about his poor council rep performance. In return he steals Penny's project and bins it. Mr Hopwood comes to the rescue and Doyle is made to retrieve the lost project from the rubbish, and loses his council rep position as a result. Brookdale agrees to a joint venture for the outdoor centre.

== DVD release ==
The third series of Grange Hill was released on DVD in the UK in 2007. The set includes all sixteen episodes.
