= Grange Hill series 4 =

Grange Hill
- Season 4
- No. of episodes: 19 (18 + Christmas Special)

Release
- Original network: BBC1
- Original release: 30 December 1980 – 27 February 1981 (Christmas Special: 28 December 1981)

Season chronology
- ← Previous; Series 3 Next → Series 5

The fourth series of the British television drama series Grange Hill began broadcasting on 30 December 1980 and finished on 27 February 1981 with a Christmas Special being broadcast on 28 December 1981 on BBC1. The series follows the lives of the staff and Students of the eponymous school, an inner-city London comprehensive school. It consisted of nineteen episodes (including the Christmas Special).

== Cast and characters ==
=== Students ===
Neil Rogers as Robbo

- Todd Carty as Tucker Jenkins
- George Armstrong as Alan Humphries
- Michelle Herbert as Trisha Yates
- Terry Sue-Patt as Benny Green
- Robert Craig-Morgan as Justin Bennett
- Vincent Hall as Michael Doyle
- Donald Waugh as Joseph Hughes
- Paul McCarthy as Tommy Watson
- Lindy Brill as Cathy Hargreaves
- Linda Slater as Susi McMahon
- Mark Eadie as Andrew Stanton
- Sheila Chandra as Sudhamani Patel
- Lesley Woods as Madelin Tanner
- Rene Alperstein as Pamela Cartwright
- Peter Moran as Pogo Patterson
- Mark Baxter as Duane Orpington
- Joanne Boakes as Anita Unsworth
- Carey Born as Karen Stanton
- Paula Ann Bland as Clare Scott
- Mark Burdis as Stewpot Stewart
- Dulice Liecier as Precious Matthews
- Susan Tully as Suzanne Ross
- Mark Savage as Gripper Stebson
- Nicholas Pandolfi as Matthew Cartwright
- Mark Farmer as Gary Hargreaves
- David Lynch as Booga Benson
- Sarah Attwood as Julia Farley

=== Teachers ===
- Stella Haime as Janet
- Michael Cronin as Mr Geoff Baxter
- Robert Hartley as Mr Keating
- James Wynn as Mr Graham Sutcliffe
- Brian Capron as Mr Stuart Hopwood
- Lucinda Gane as Miss Terri Mooney
- Susan Porrett as Mrs Hilary Thomas
- Cheryl Branker as Miss Peterson
- Neville Barber as Mr John Curtis
- Gwyneth Powell as Mrs Bridget McClusky
- Allyson Rees as Miss Lexington
- Timothy Bateson as Mr Thompson
- Paul Jerricho as Mr Hicks

== Episodes ==
No.	Episode	Writer	Director	Original airdate
1	Episode One	Phil Redmond	Colin Cant	30 December 1980
Justin is having troubles with his over-protective mother. Mrs. McClusky makes a start at the school, which is having vandalism problems. She puts new rules in place prohibiting Students from staying inside during breaks. Tuck shop prices go up, and up and up. Trisha and Cathy form a group with some other girls. There is a competition to make a new design for the school magazine, with £10 as the prize, and Tucker thinks he is in with a chance. When a deliberate fire is started and someone is injured, a new prefect scheme is started. First appearance: Pamela Cartwright, Booga Benson and Mrs Bridget "The Midget" McClusky
2	Episode Two	Phil Redmond	Colin Cant	2 January 1981
The Tuck Shop prices rise again. Trisha is torn between fighting against the school lockout and being part of Cathy's band; Mr Sutcliffe persuades the girls that she will have to go. Tucker catches a first-former writing graffiti but gets accused himself by the caretaker.
3	Episode Three	Phil Redmond & Sandy Welch	Christine Secombe	6 January 1981
Pogo overhears a girl talk about "time of the month", and tries the same excuse! A medical is in the offing for the first year—everyone speculates about how intrusive it will be. Alan worries about whether his smoking vice will be spotted, Clare is worried too, because she has not started her periods, and Salena is worried because her country's customs disapprove of undressing in company. First appearance: Richard Marks, Matthew Cartwright, Suzanne Ross and Clare Scott
4	Episode Four	Phil Redmond	Colin Cant	9 January 1981
Gripper Stebson makes his first appearance and gives Grange Hill a bad reputation at the sweet shop. Mr Hicks seems to be a bit of a head-case at the swimming lesson: he pushes Christopher Stewart (Stewpot), who cuts his head. He talks his way out of it when Stewpot's mother comes to complain, because the boys are scared of him. Mr. Baxter announces that Mr Hicks will be taking PE. Mr. Hicks now has it in for Stewpot. Miss Lexington senses something is wrong and speaks to Mr. Baxter, who reprimands her for listening to tittle-tattle. However, the older kids are putting doubts in his mind, so he surreptitiously goes to watch Mr. Hicks in action. When he sees Hicks pushing Christopher to the ground, he calls him out and punches him on the jaw. Hicks is dismissed, much to everyone's relief. First appearance: Gripper Stebson, Christopher "Stewpot" Stewart, Miss Lexington and Danny Taylor
5	Episode Five	Phil Redmond & Sandy Welch	Christine Secombe	13 January 1981
While talking about the bad behaviour of Doyle, Trisha learns that the school has a file on her. Tucker seems confident about his art winning the Magazine Cover Competition, but Doyle seems determined to scupper him. Trisha and Susi have another meeting about their rights and problems - a poll is being held asking everyone about their opinions. Trisha goes to see Mrs. McClusky about being treated like kids and asks to see her file. Alan finds Susi is at his house, and she ropes him into working out a plan of action.
6	Episode Six	Phil Redmond	Sarah Hellings	16 January 1981
It is the day of the disco. Tucker reckons Booga Benson is behind the vandalism. Booga tears up Tucker's competition entry, so Tucker bunks off home to recreate it. Tucker wins the competition with his replacement entry, but his absence during the day has not gone unnoticed. Tucker catches Booga in the act of vandalising Mr. Baxter's office but is threatened not to tell. The caretaker announces that the vandalism has gone too far, and the disco dance is cancelled. Tucker is now in a quandary, torn between saving his skin, and saving the disco—and he reports Booga to Mrs. McClusky. Sooty and the Sootettes (with Mr. Sutcliffe and Cathy) have a hit on their hands with "Detention Blues". At the end of the evening, all seems to have ended up okay for Tucker and his mates, except that Booga Benson is waiting for them. Final Appearance: Booga Benson
7	Episode Seven	Phil Redmond & Alan Janes	Christine Secombe	20 January 1981
A new flashy sports strip causes complaints about the extra cost, especially as it is only bought from one shop who can charge what they like. Booga has cracked Tucker's rib, and now Tucker is laid up at home. Mrs. McClusky is not pleased that the school magazine is bad mouthing her decision about the new sports strip and bans publication with the excuse that there is no money to produce it. Susi and Rosie wonder if they can make the magazine self-supporting, for instance, by raising the cover price. Pogo tries to find out what the wholesale prices of the sports strip will be, but the manufacturer will not listen to him. Alan's dad is roped into making a phone call and finds out the markup the shop is making is over 100%.
8	Episode Eight	Phil Redmond & Alan Janes	Christine Secombe	23 January 1981
Mr. Baxter is offended when Stewpot would prefer to go on a school trip to a silicon chip factory than do football practice. Duane has taken a fancy to "Sexy Lexy" (Miss Lexington), much to Clare's disgust. The stone-cold school dinners cause aggravation to Anita and Suzanne. Mrs. McClusky cancels Miss Lexington's trip when she sees how badly dressed her class are. Danny starts a lottery, but canny Gripper buys a matching lottery book from the shops. Could things get any worse? Yes, because Precious Matthews also has a winning ticket and will not take no for an answer! First Appearance: Precious Matthews; Final appearance: Karen Stanton
9	Episode Nine	Phil Redmond & Margaret Simpson	Christine Secombe	27 January 1981
Suzanne Ross spreads a rumour about school uniform coming back. Miss Mooney chastises Pogo Patterson for his smug attitude toward poor Student Richard Marks. Cathy's tardiness is becoming more regular. Pogo wants the boys to be able to play table tennis, rather than just the girls, which leads to a heated discussion about feminism. Trisha Yates finds that their school rep has emigrated, and what with Doyle being kicked out of his position, she pushes Justin into being a replacement, along with herself. At a meeting between school reps and the staff, Mrs McClusky makes plain her view that school uniform is a good idea, which goes down like a lead balloon with Trisha, but the Head backs down. The meeting votes for just a part of the school building being used during breaks, but Pogo pretends to be Superman, and breaks a table—the caretaker threatens to speak to Mr. Keating. Miss Peterson is sympathetic to learn that Cathy's poor work is due to her rehearsals with her group.
10	Episode Ten	Phil Redmond & Margaret Simpson	Christine Secombe	30 January 1981
Miss Peterson has arranged for Cathy to practise in the lunchtime. Pogo's class is getting fed up with him for not owning up about the chair he broke, so they tell him that boys can play table tennis. School dinners seem to be going from bad to worse, and take too long. Pamela Cartwright, who writes for the school magazine, liaises with Trisha, but this gets up the nose of Cathy. Trisha proposes a kind of snack bar for lunches, and a questionnaire is distributed, which ruffles a few feathers. Cathy is starting up the militant School Action Group, but falls out with Trisha, who is using the School Council to solve issues.
11	Episode Eleven	Alan Janes	Christine Secombe	3 February 1981
Doyle sinks to a new low—stealing light bulbs and selling them to a second-hand shop, and replacing the good ones with duds. In the storeroom, Tucker nags Alan about his smoking habit. Cathy's group gives an impressive trial performance to Justin and Andrew. Mr Thompson comes to the conclusion that the School's electrics are faulty, because so many bulbs are failing. When Doyle and his mates go to sell the bulbs, they find the transaction is not as profitable as they hoped—but perhaps if they can also supply toilet rolls. The caretaker notices the smoky smells from Alan's illicit cigarettes and locks the storeroom. As a result, Alan uses his desk for an illicit drag, but is caught by Mr. Hopwood. Cathy observes Doyle stealing light bulbs and asks Andrew Stanton to have a quiet word with Doyle.
12	Episode Twelve	Phil Redmond & Alan Janes	Colin Cant	6 February 1981
Tommy Watson has left it too late for the trip to France. Tucker devises a scheme that lets him get on the coach. On the ferry, two French lads waste no time in chatting up Cathy and Trisha—"Bit handy ain't they", says Trisha. Tucker and Alan are intent on keeping Tommy hidden. The coach lands on the other side of the Channel, and a customs man is insistent on having a good look around. Unfortunately, he spots Tommy under the back seat. The holiday is ruined, but Miss Lexington has a bright idea to save the day. Final Appearance of: Janet the secretary (credited as Stella Monsell)
13	Episode Thirteen	Phil Redmond	Colin Cant	10 February 1981
Andrew Stanton's mother seems preoccupied. Tucker is giving Pamela Cartwright longing looks. Alan is getting increasingly secretive with his smoking habit, and also irritable. Tucker is playing mean tricks on the first-formers—telling them to go and see Mrs McClusky. Andrew is found drunk and unconscious in the changing rooms. He is wheeled out of sight on a trolley. Tucker intends to go round to Andrew's house, but is intercepted by Mrs. McClusky, who finds out the truth, and goes to Mrs. Stanton to discuss Andrew's drinking. Tucker makes one last attempt to ask out Pamela.
14	Episode Fourteen	Alan Janes	Colin Cant	13 February 1981
Tucker bets Tommy that Alan is going out with Susi; to prove it, he devises a plan of sending a love letter to Susi, asking her to come to a café, to see how she reacts. Her mum finds the letter, and is not pleased, so Susi is confined to her bedroom. Tucker and Tommy wait in vain for Susi, who apologises to Alan for not turning up. He is bewildered by this, but puts two and two together and confronts Tucker. Susi's mum has an unsatisfactory meeting with Alan's dad who is rather blasé about their offspring's relationship, and refuses to chastise his son. Some first years meet a narrow escape when they encounter a paedophile while using a shortcut home, but Tucker saves the day.
15	Episode Fifteen	Alan Janes	Graham Theakston	17 February 1981
Cathy's group has got a paying gig, but it means bunking off school. Tucker is feeling left out with Alan spending so much time with Susi. Doyle and Tucker find themselves learning Judo. Alan floors Doyle easily but Doyle vows to have his revenge outside, however Alan does not seem such an easy pushover as he thought. Alan leaves his judo outfit behind in the tussle, and Doyle takes it away to sell. Tucker buys a second-hand costume—the label has been cut off, but Alan finds it disturbingly familiar. Alan confronts the dodgy second-hand shop owner about his judo suit who denies knowledge—but Doyle chooses that moment to enter. Tucker threatens to go to the police and reclaims the money he paid for the judo suit. Cathy and her group's gig becomes a complete shambles, unpaid, and with almost no audience.
16	Episode Sixteen	Phil Redmond	Colin Cant	20 February 1981
Cathy's group have been found out and have an appointment with Mrs. McClusky. It is time for the third -formers to choose their options, but they find annoying limitations of what subjects can be chosen. Susi confides to Pamela that her parents never discuss anything. Mrs. McClusky recommends that the girls in Cathy's group are expelled for skipping school. Tucker's mum bends his ear about going to university, but he would be keener on working in a garage. Trisha wants to do technical drawing, but finds the option closed to girls. She talks to McClusky but finds no help there. Cathy's mother is not happy about the idea of expulsion for her daughter and suggest the cane as a short, sharp, alternative. Tucker overhears Pamela Cartwright say she would rather go out with Penny Lewis' pony than him! Final appearance: Carol Yates and Gary Hargreaves
17	Episode Seventeen	Jane Hollowood & Alan Janes	Graham Theakston	24 February 1981
Gripper leans on Pogo to do his homework, who in turn leans on an exasperated Matthew. Pogo messes up Gripper's homework to get him into trouble—he is about to change his mind when Gripper grabs it back off him. Miss Mooney goes mad at Gripper's terrible work, and after the lesson Pogo runs for his life. In the fight that follows, Pogo causes severe damage to the common room. Under interrogation, the truth about Pogo's homework service comes out. Gripper is suspended as a result and Pogo gets the cane. The hooliganism gives Mrs. McClusky and the rest of the PTA a determination to bring back school uniform.
18	Episode Eighteen	Phil Redmond	Christine Secombe	27 February 1981
Claire is fed up with the boys pretending they are better, getting the best of everything, and she is not the only one. Cathy is trying to make friends again with Trisha, but her former pal seems impermeable. Trisha has got a bee in her bonnet about boy's subjects, and wants to go round the car factory. A boys vs girls contest is planned, with various sporting, practical and academic competitions. Boys just win the quiz (with a suspicion of cheating), but are thrashed at netball, also not without some cheating. Meanwhile, the cake baking of Mr. Sutcliffe leaves a lot to be desired, as does Miss Mooney's metalwork. Their respective assistants though have bought ready-made versions as a backup. Mrs. McClusky declares the contest a draw! Final appearance: Miss Peterson, Sudhamani Patel
19	Christmas Special	Phil Redmond & Paul Manning	Hugh David	28 December 1981
Christmas looms, but Tucker and his mates do not escape the vigilant Mr. Sutcliffe when they arrive at school late. Tucker tells Mr. Sutcliffe that he is looking pale, as a distraction, but the observation is echoed by Miss Mooney, and Mrs. McClusky a bit later. Mrs. McClusky tells the assembly that some videos have gone missing, and also that there is an end of term disco. Mr Sutcliffe is volunteered into making the arrangements for the disco, and talks to Tucker, Alan and Tommy. Tucker suggests his brother does the music—he is able to lay his hands on the necessary equipment. Tucker fails to persuade the teacher to give him £20 for expenses but does compromise by getting the detention cancelled. Meanwhile, Trisha and Cathy go shopping for clothes, and Trisha is driven mad by Cathy's indecision. Alan gets some stick for his neat suit—just what did Susi promise him to persuade him to wear it! Final appearances: Michael Doyle, Tommy Watson, Susi McMahon, Andrew Stanton

== DVD release ==
The fourth series of Grange Hill was released on DVD in the UK in 2007. The set includes eighteen episodes (excluding the Christmas Special).

The 1981 Christmas Special was later included in the Series 8 boxset on 19 November 2019 on its DVD release by Eureka Entertainment. This episode includes subtitles and is shown in the 4:3 format with a running time of 24mins.

== Notes ==
Episode 4 is notable for having been entirely shot on film, including the closing credits. The norm for Grange Hill in this era was that only outdoor scenes were on film, with the rest of the programme recorded on videotape.
