= Grange Hill series 5 =

Grange Hill
- Season 5
- No. of episodes: 18

Release
- Original network: BBC One
- Original release: 5 January – 5 March 1982

Season chronology
- ← Previous; Series 4 Next → Series 6

The fifth series of the British television drama series Grange Hill began broadcasting on 5 January 1982, before ending on 5 March 1982 on BBC One. The series follows the lives of the staff and Students of the eponymous school, an inner-city London comprehensive school. It consists of eighteen episodes.

== Cast and characters ==
=== Students ===
- Todd Carty as Tucker Jenkins
- George Armstrong as Alan Humphries
- Michelle Herbert as Trisha Yates
- Terry Sue-Patt as Benny Green
- Robert Craig-Morgan as Justin Bennett
- Lindy Brill as Cathy Hargreaves
- Ruth Davies as Penny Lewis
- Rene Alperstein as Pamela Cartwright
- Peter Moran as Pogo Patterson
- Mark Baxter as Duane Orpington
- Joanne Boakes as Anita Unsworth
- Paula Ann Bland as Claire Scott
- Mark Burdis as Stewpot Stewart
- Lisa East as Christine Everson
- Dulice Liecier as Precious Matthews
- Susan Tully as Suzanne Ross
- Mark Savage as Gripper Stebson
- Nicholas Pandolfi as Matthew Cartwright
- Julian Griffiths as Denny Rees
- Lee MacDonald as Zammo McGuire
- Erkan Mustafa as Roland Browning
- Alison Bettles as Fay Lucas
- Simone Nylander as Janet St. Clair
- Nadia Chambers as Annette Firman
- Terry Kinsella as Jimmy Flynn
- Lee Sparke as Jonah Jones
- Paula Taras as Belinda Zowkowski

=== Teachers ===
- Michael Cronin as Mr Geoff Baxter
- Robert Hartley as Mr Keating
- James Wynn as Mr Graham Sutcliffe
- Brian Capron as Mr Stuart Hopwood
- Lucinda Gane as Miss Terri Mooney
- Susan Porrett as Mrs Hilary Thomas
- Gwyneth Powell as Mrs Bridget McClusky
- Allyson Rees as Miss Lexington
- Timothy Bateson as Mr Thompson
- Fraser Cains as Mr Bill McGuffey

== Episodes ==
No.	Episode	Writer	Director	Original airdate
1	Arrival	Alan Janes	Diarmuid Lawrence	5 January 1982
Six new Students arrive at Grange Hill. Roland Browning gets off to a bad start when he falls victim to Gripper – and the whole school. Meanwhile, best friends Jonah and Zammo unleash stink bombs onto the school, disrupting Miss Mooney's first lesson. First Appearances: Jonah Jones, Zammo McGuire, Roland Browning and more ...
2	Settling In	Alan Jane	Anthea Browne-Wilkinson	8 January 1982
When Gripper takes bullying to a new level, Roland is pushed over the edge and deliberately cuts himself in woodwork, forcing Mrs. McClusky to summon his mother to school. Meanwhile, Zammo and Jonah ask for Mr. Hopwood's help in teaching Gripper a lesson that he will never forget.
3	Sex Education	Jane Hollowood	Anthea Browne-Wilkinson	12 January 1982
A lesson on human biology is announced, and a letter is sent home to alert the parents of what their children are learning. Mrs. McClusky thinks it's a great idea until her office is filled with angry parents, and Claire's disapproving mother only makes matters worse. Meanwhile, Pogo tries to make money by selling school textbooks that contain pornographic images. Final appearance: Pamela Cartwright
4	Text Books	Margaret Simpson	Anthea Browne-Wilkinson	15 January 1982
With Grange Hill in financial crisis, The Computer Club wants to buy a new computer for £1200, and the PTA tries to come up with some fund-raising ideas. A "Sponsored Spell" is on the cards. Meanwhile, Gripper sees the text book shortages as a way of earning money, getting his supplies from St. Mary's girls. He ropes in Pogo as an unwilling accomplice to sell them. Unfortunately, Gripper's muggings have not gone unreported – Mrs. McClusky is investigating his latest bullying scheme.
5	Instruments	Margaret Simpson	Anthea Browne-Wilkinson	19 January 1982
Belinda starts learning the clarinet, an expensive instrument that she becomes paranoid about getting damaged. Annette hides it in the boys' changing rooms for a laugh, but Belinda is not amused, and nor is Pogo when she bursts in while he is changing. Annette's joke backfires when they discover the clarinet has disappeared... First Appearance: Janet St Clair, Mr McGuffey
6	Sports Trials	Margaret Simpson	Christine Secombe	22 January 1982
Benny inspires Zammo to become an athlete and saves Roland from another beating from Gripper. Even though he escaped Gripper's demands for payment, Roland is having trouble with his other classmates, and desperately wants to gain their friendship by signing up for the School Revue, led by Mr McGuffey. Final appearance: Benny Green
7	Saturday Job	Barry Purchese	John Prowse	26 January 1982
Gripper fools Mr. McGuffey into believing he has the wrong room by locking the door and H3 cause havoc for him until Mr. Hopwood arrives. Teachers are noticing that Suzanne Ross is bunking off and Mr. Hopwood discovers why. Mr. McGuffey shows off his performing feet to the amusement of Pogo, who gives a weak comedic performance. The teacher is more impressed with the natural humour of Stewart and Duane.
8	Scruffy McGuffey	Barry Purchese	John Prowse	29 January 1982
Pogo is determined to profit from selling tickets for the School Revue. Matthew Cartwright has written a piece for the school magazine, but the editors have doubts about publishing it. Gripper offers Matthew protection against possible damage to his new digital watch. Suzanne comes to school in a chic dress and has an audience with Mrs. McClusky. Mr. 'Scruffy' McGuffey finds himself defending his "sartorial style", and loses control of his class after an outbreak of humming, and he accidentally antagonises Mrs McClusky.
9	Stickers	Barry Purchese	John Prowse	2 February 1982
Jonah comes to school plastered with badges, but Mr. Hopwood insists that they are all removed. Placing yellow stickers on different places and unsuspecting people becomes a new hobby, much to the caretaker's disgust. Who can put a sticker in the most daring place, the boys or the girls? Meanwhile, Roland is seeing an educational psychologist, but Gripper has found out and gives him some grief about it. Things get worse for Roland when he is framed for grassing on Jonah and Zammo, and turned against the whole school. Has Gripper finally pushed Roland too far?
10	Exploration	Barry Purchese	John Browse	5 February 1982
Zammo and Jonah have been cleaning up the stickers, including ones mysteriously found on the school trophies. Fay, Annette and Belinda are told tales about the service tunnels by the workmen. Annette has a go at Fay for being too goody-goody. She challenges Fay to go spelunking with her in the service tunnels. After school, the girls have a row, and Fay storms off, but Belinda stays to follow Annette. Once underground, it's Belinda who seems to have taken charge. While the girls get lost, thieves have broken in under Gripper's instructions, in search of the trophy cabinet.
11	Sponsorship	Jane Hollowood	John Prowse	9 February 1982
Miss Mooney announces a scheme of collecting "Minto bar" wrappers to raise money for science, but some are cynical about the chocolate bar's promotional gimmick. It's girls versus boys. Roland's father owns a firm that sells Minto bars. Will Roland's determination to fit in amongst Grange Hill force him to steal from his father?
12	Zoo	Jane Hollowood	Diarmuid Lawrence	12 February 1982
A trip to the zoo gets off to a bad start when Roland can't fit through the turnstiles. Even Miss Mooney is finding the loud teacher from a rival boys' school hard to bear. Annette chats up Carrots Garvey, a Student of Westerfield School, and a friendly little war breaks out, and Zammo finds himself targeted by a new student, while Jonah goes for an unexpected swim...
13	Girl Gangs	Margaret Simpson	Anthea Browne-Wilkinson	16 February 1982
Claire can't believe her eyes when she witnesses Suzanne demanding money off Roland Browning. She is horrified to discover Suzanne has become Gripper's latest partner in crime. Can she save her friend from going off the rails? Meanwhile, it's time for rehearsals for the School Revue. The School Council meeting seems unsatisfactory – Mrs. McClusky won't even discuss censorship of the School Magazine. First Appearance: Christine Everson Final appearance: Justin Bennett
14	Diary	Margaret Simpson	Anthea Browne-Wilkinson	19 February 1982
Claire seems to be hanging around Mr. Hopwood a lot. The student biology teacher has difficulty controlling the third formers, what with Duane's laughter box and Pogo's bleeping watch. Claire is writing a diary, in which she fantasizes situations with her heartthrob Mr. Hopwood. Her mother finds the hidden diary and reads the romantic entries, and becomes convinced something is going on. Claire's father arrives at Grange Hill, confronts Mr Hopwood in front of Students and makes a complaint to Mrs McClusky. Will a schoolgirl crush result in the end of a teacher's career?
15	Despair	Alan Janes	John Prowse	23 February 1982
Roland has a session with his educational psychologist and is told he has to go and see a dietician. At the rehearsals for the School Revue, Janet tries to talk to him, but in backing away from her evil clutches, Roland steps through the scenery. Gripper tries to see if Roland really can roll, and then Roland gets grief from his mum over the state of his clothes. Gripper's demands for cash have now reached the point beyond Roly's means. He tries to fight the bully, but his blows are ineffective. Someone writes a message about Roland's meetings with a shrink, and it proves to be the final straw when Roland goes missing...
16	School Revue	Barry Purchese	Diarmuid Lawrence	26 February 1982
Pogo is appointed as a replacement for one of Suzanne's team in the School Revue – but is lacking what Mr. McGuffey calls 'Elegance'. Tucker and Alan buy some cheap champagne, paying in small change, for a prize in a raffle – Mr. McGuffey's not entirely happy about this, but it does seem to have boosted ticket sales. Everyone is playing a role in the School Revue. But will it be enough to impress Mrs. McClusky? Final appearance: Tucker Jenkins (as a series regular), Alan Humphries, Trisha Yates, Cathy Hargreaves and Penny Lewis
17	Aftermath	Alan Janes	Anthea Browne-Wilkinson	2 March 1982
Mrs. McClusky announces that Roland's out of danger, but won't be back for a while. She suggests that N1 creates a get-well card and Annette is appointed artist. Belinda tells Fay and Annette that she has to leave, because she's going back to Canada, and Fay decides that they'll buy a present for her. Everyone is forced to make a donation for both Roland and Belinda, and Gripper plots to steal it. Can Jonah and Zammo stop his reign of terror reaching a new low? Final appearance: Belinda Zowkowski
18	Exams	Alan Janes	Anthea Browne-Wilkinson	5 March 1982
It's nearing the end of term, and Mrs. McClusky antagonises everyone by bringing exam week forward. Pogo resorts to cheating to pass his exams. But Gripper is keen to cause trouble for him. Will he ruin Pogo's future at Grange Hill just for some fun? Meanwhile, Mr. Sutcliffe and Miss Mooney's engagement is in jeopardy when they come to blows about the date of the wedding, And, Suzanne clashes with Claire's strict mother. Final appearance: Mr Sutcliffe

== Release history ==
The fifth series of Grange Hill was released on dvd by Eureka Entertainment on 19 November 2018. This series includes English subtitles on all 18 episodes on three DVD discs, with format of 4:3 and total running time of 443 mins. (7hrs 23min)

In 2021 the fifth series was released on the streaming platform BritBox
