= Grange Hill series 2 =

Grange Hill
- Season 2
- No. of episodes: 18

Release
- Original network: BBC One
- Original release: 2 January – 2 March 1979

Season chronology
- ← Previous; Series 1 Next → Series 3

The second series of the British television drama series Grange Hill began broadcasting on 2 January 1979, before ending on 2 March 1979 on BBC One. The series follows the lives of the staff and Students of the eponymous school, an inner-city London comprehensive school. It consists of eighteen episodes.

== Cast and characters ==
=== Students ===
- Todd Carty as Tucker Jenkins
- George Armstrong as Alan Humphries
- Michelle Herbert as Trisha Yates
- Terry Sue-Patt as Benny Green
- Robert Craig-Morgan as Justin Bennett
- Vincent Hall as Michael Doyle
- Donald Waugh as Joseph Hughes
- Abigail Brown as Judy Preston
- Paul McCarthy as Tommy Watson
- Lindy Brill as Cathy Hargreaves
- Linda Slater as Susi McMahon
- Mark Chapman as Andrew Stanton
- Sheila Chandra as Sudhamani Patel
- Vinny Mann as Antoni Karamanopolis
- Lesley Woods as Madelin Tanner
- Ruth Davies as Penny Lewis
- Paul Miller as Simon Shaw
- Kim Benson as Mary Johnson
- Julia Gale as Carol Yates
- Miriam Mann as Jackie Heron
- Karen Snow as Lucy
- Mark Farmer as Gary Hargreaves
- Sara Sugarman as Jessica Samuels
- Alan Gibson as Joey Singer
- Neil Rogers as Robbo
- Hubert Clarke as Terry O’Brian

=== Teachers ===
- Michael Percival as Mr Tony Mitchell
- Brenda Cavendish as Mrs Shubert
- Stella Haime as Janet
- Graham Ashley as Mr Garfield
- Jill Dixon as Miss Pauline Clarke
- Michael Cronin as Mr Geoff Baxter
- Robert Hartley as Mr Keating
- James Wynn as Mr Graham Sutcliffe
- Sean Arnold as Mr Llewellyn
- Philomena McDonagh as Miss June Summers
- Anthony Dawes as Mr Golightly

== Episodes ==
No.	Episode	Writer	Director	Original airdate
1	Episode One Mess	Phil Redmond	Colin Cant	2 January 1979
There is a new headmaster at Grange Hill - Mr Llewellyn, who introduces a new timetable and changes the forms to match the school name. There seems to be some confusion between the form rooms, so Mr Mitchell and G3's form tutor leave, resulting in a smashed window. Grange Hill are playing at Brookdale and 50p goes missing, but by coincidence Benny has found the same amount. Will anyone believe his story? First appearances: Mr Llewellyn, Simon Shaw, Mr Geoff "Bullet" Baxter, Mr Golighty, Miss June Summers, Cathy Hargreaves, Madelin Tanner, Sudhamani Patel and Singer
2	Episode Two Thief	Phil Redmond	Colin Cant	5 January 1979
Judy has to go to Brookdale due to family circumstances and she really doesn't want to go. During PE, Justin has an accident and he catches Singer in the act of stealing, but Singer warns Justin not to tell. Singer is later rumbled by Mr Baxter and Benny is put in the clear over the theft at Brookdale, but his dad isn't happy. First appearance: Antoni Karamanopolis, Penny Lewis and Susi McMahon.
3	Episode Three Tired	Phil Redmond & Alan Janes	Colin Cant	9 January 1979
Justin makes friends with Andrew Stanton after Doyle gives Justin trouble. Antoni Karamanopolis is falling asleep and Miss Summers investigates and it turns out Antoni works in his Dad's restaurant up to 4 times a week. The staff go on strike due to timetable confusions. Andrew's mum is worried about him and asks Justin. First appearance: Andrew Stanton
4	Episode Four Gary	Phil Redmond & Margaret Simpson	Colin Cant	12 January 1979
Mr Mitchell finds the form has terrible grammar. Trisha seems attracted to Cathy's brother. Trisha rings for Simon in the morning, under instructions, in order to get him to school on time. With Gary Hargreaves vying for Trisha's affections, jealousy is in the air. First appearance: Gary Hargreaves and Mr. Sutcliffe
5	Episode Five Jumble	Phil Redmond & Margaret Simpson	Colin Cant	16 January 1979
The development of SAG (School Action Group) continues. Penny Lewis is voted school council rep. Arguments ensue about a tuck shop and book shop. A jumble sale is proposed to raise the initial cash to buy stock. Students go walkabout to collect from the local houses and shops. Tucker's enthusiasm for the jumble sale causes havoc. First appearance: Jessica Samuels, Dave and Mike
6	Episode Six Locked In	Phil Redmond	Roger Singleton-Turner	19 January 1979
Simon Shaw's initiation into the Tremblers (a group seemingly made up on the spur of the moment by Tucker) involves climbing into the tower – a secret area discovered by Tucker and his gang. When Benny gets locked in, an unauthorized return to school after hours leads to a disastrous fire .
7	Episode Seven Jumbled Up	Phil Redmond	Roger Singleton-Turner	23 January 1979
After the fire in the previous episode, Tucker and his mates wait for news. The costs of the fire come out of the jumble sale proceeds. Shaw reveals his reading deficiency to Trisha. Trisha becomes Simon's teacher until Mr Sutcliffe finds out too, but she doesn't seem cut out for teaching.
8	Episode Eight Prowler	Phil Redmond & Alan Janes	Colin Cant	26 January 1979
There is increased vigilance at school after police alert them to the presence of a man following girls in the area. Trisha and Cathy are given a parcel to post, and have seemingly forgotten the warning, and separate to go home. Cathy is being stalked, becomes aware of this, and makes a run for it. In the meantime, her sister, worried after not finding her at school, involves Mr. Mitchell, and a chase follows in a police car. But is the stalker all he appears to be?
9	Episode Nine Dad	Phil Redmond & Margaret Simpson	Roger Singleton-Turner	30 January 1979
Cathy's home life becomes complicated by the return of her dad. SAG has another meeting. Work is recreated for the school play, which had been lost in the fire. Bully Jacky Heron reappears on the scene. Cathy falls out with Trisha and aligns herself with Madelin Tanner. Miss Summers is accused of hitting Cathy, when she separates her fighting with Trisha over a fake inkblot, and her job is on the line. Final appearance: Simon Shaw
10	Episode Ten Shoplifting	Phil Redmond	Roger Singleton-Turner	2 February 1979
The staff take strike action against Miss Summers' resignation. Cathy goes off with Madelin and behaves badly at a shopping centre. The pair shoplift, and flirt with boys, by dropping sugar lumps on their heads. The thieving gets out of hand when Madelin puts her theft into Cathy's bag, and she is caught by the police. Back at school, the Head gives Cathy a second chance. Filmed at the Arndale Shopping Centre, Wandsworth, London (now called Southside)
11	Episode Eleven Picket	Phil Redmond	Colin Cant	6 February 1979
Mr Baxter picks his team for the match against Brookdale. Blazer-turning-inside-out becomes a defiant new fashion. Tucker rebels against the special tables for Free-meals kids, like Benny. Jess from the SAG takes up the case and a riot ensues until the Headmaster arrives. The proposed football match against Brookdale becomes a cricket match. SAG change tactics to protest at the cricket practice, but Baxter stands firm. The SAG picket line prevents cricket practice so Benny ropes in Tucker and Alan. At the last minute, the cricket team outwit SAG who are trying to stop them playing. Could Justin Bennett surprise them all?
12	Episode Twelve Sit In	Phil Redmond	Roger Singleton-Turner	9 February 1979
Trisha makes it up with Cathy. People seem to be standing behind SAG, which holds a demonstration. The headmaster agrees the uniforms issue will be raised, but at the meeting the vote goes against doing anything. A sit-in is organized, but backfires when they get locked in. The press are called, but the Head wins them round to his side. Trisha and Cathy hide when the siege is over, fearful of the consequences, but Mr Mitchell turns up on their doorstep, and they are suspended for a week. Final appearance: Jessica Samuels, Dave and Mike
13	Episode Thirteen The Play	Phil Redmond & Margaret Simpson	Colin Cant	13 February 1979
Andrew feels ill before the play. Tucker gets into trouble for missing Maths to work on the play, and becomes absorbed in creating the bike, a prop in the play. Jackie Heron's gang attempt to sabotage the play, but Tucker saves the day with some unauthorized pilfering from his mum's wardrobe, which doesn't go unnoticed. First appearance: Mr Keating; Final appearances: Jackie Heron, Brenda and Lucy
14	Episode Fourteen Fight	Phil Redmond	Roger Singleton-Turner	16 February 1979
While fighting with Brookdale kids, Benny loses his blazer. Tucker leads an infiltration into the enemy school to retrieve it.
15	Episode Fifteen The Trip	Phil Redmond & Alan Janes	Colin Cant	20 February 1979
On a school trip to Beaconsfield, Justin gets coach-sick and Doyle frightens Susi and Penny, who get hopelessly lost in woodland.
16	Episode Sixteen Lost	Phil Redmond & Alan Janes	Colin Cant	23 February 1979
Still at camp, Mr Sutcliffe announces a puma has escaped, and although the boys have returned, the two girls are still missing. A full-scale search is started. Doyle wants to keep mum, but the others want to tell the authorities when they saw the girls. Finally Justin spills the beans, and the search party is able to concentrate on the right area. In the meantime, the girls have fallen in the swamp, and are struggling with their predicament. During the search, Justin seems to become assertive, and loses his fear of Doyle. Mr Mitchell decides that the incident won't be reported, as the boys have learned their lesson.
17	Episode Seventeen Struggling	Phil Redmond & Margaret Simpson	Colin Cant	27 February 1979
Susi worries about her academic abilities, and struggles with Maths. Tucker finds a geography exam paper – surely it must be the one to be used in the upcoming exams? Susi fakes sickness to get off school, but then goes down with a fever for real on the day of the exams. The Head announces that uniforms will become optional.
18	Episode Eighteen Quiz	Phil Redmond	Roger Singleton-Turner	2 March 1979
A surprise return of Judy Preston, but only to announce an end-of-term quiz against Brookdale. The draw picks Hughesy, who wishes he'd never volunteered. Doyle locks him in a cupboard, but he escapes in time – will GH be victorious? Mr Mitchell leaves the school. Last appearances: Mr Tony "Old Mitch" Mitchell, Miss June Summers, Mr Golighty, Mr Llewellyn, Judy Preston and loads more...

== DVD release ==
The second series of Grange Hill was released on DVD in the UK in 2007. The set includes all eighteen episodes.
