= List of Grange Hill characters =

This is a list of characters from the long-running BBC children's series Grange Hill.

== Students ==
Character	Actor(s)	Series	Years
Justin Bennett	Robert Morgan (later credited as Robert Craig-Morgan) (Note: On joining the actors' union Equity at the age of 16, it was necessary for some Grange Hill actors to change their professional names to avoid confusion with existing artists with the same name.)	1–5	1978–1982
Judy Preston	Abigail Brown (later credited as Abigail Arundel)	1–2	1978–1979
Michael Doyle	Vincent Hall	1–4	1978–1981
Peter "Tucker" Jenkins	Todd Carty	1–5, 26, 31	1978–1982, 2003, 2008
Tommy Watson	James Jebbia	1	1978
Tommy Watson	Paul McCarthy	3–4	1980–1981
Ann Wilson	Lucinda Duckett	1	1978
Trisha Yates	Michelle Herbert	1–5	1978–1982
Alan Humphries (Note: The character was referred to as both Alan Turner and Alan Hargreaves in Series 1.)	George Armstrong	1–5	1978–1982
Benny Green	Terry Sue-Patt	1–5	1978–1982
Joseph Hughes	Donald Waugh	1–4	1978–1981
Mary Johnson	Kim Benson	1–3	1978–1980
Simon Shaw	Paul Miller	2	1979
Jessica Samuels	Sara Sugarman	2	1979
Sudhamani Patel	Sheila Chandra	2–4	1979–1981
Andrew Stanton	Mark Chapman (later credited as Mark Eadie)	2–4	1979–1981
Susi McMahon	Linda Slater	2–4	1979–1981
Cathy Hargreaves	Lindy Brill	2–5	1979–1982
Penny Lewis	Ruth Davies	2–3, 5	1979–1980, 1982
Antoni Karamanopolis	Vinny Mann	2–3	1979–1980
Madelin Tanner	Lesley Woods	2–3	1979–1980
Tracy Edwards	Amanda Mealing	3	1980
Sally Forsyth	Sarah Summerfield	3	1980
Michael Green	Mark Bishop	3–4	1980–1981
Anita Unsworth	Joanne Boakes	3–7	1980–1984
Karen Stanton	Carey Born	3–4	1980–1981
Douglas "Pogo" Patterson	Peter Moran (later credited as Peter Emmett)	3–7	1980–1984
Duane Orpington	Mark Baxter	3–7	1980–1984
Pamela Cartwright	Rene Alperstein	4–5	1981–1982
Matthew Cartwright	Nicholas Pandolfi	4–5	1981–1982
Suzanne Ross	Susan Tully	4–7	1981–1984
Precious Matthews	Dulice Liecier	4–8	1981–1985
Christopher "Stewpot" Stewart	Mark Burdis	4–8	1981–1985
Norman "Gripper" Stebson	Mark Savage	4–8	1981–1985
Claire Scott	Paula Ann Bland	4–8	1981–1985
Richard Marks	David Doyle	4–5	1981–1982
Denny Rees	Julian Griffiths	5–6	1982–1983
Belinda Zowkowski	Paula Taras	5	1982
Gordon "Jonah" Jones	Lee Sparke	5–6	1982–1983
Annette Firman	Nadia Chambers	5–8	1982–1985
Janet St. Clair	Simone Nylander	5–9	1982–1986
Samuel "Zammo" Maguire	Lee MacDonald	5–10	1982–1987
Roland Browning	Erkan Mustafa	5–10	1982–1987
Fay Lucas	Alison Bettles	5–10	1982–1987
Christine Everson	Lisa East	5–7	1982–1984
Jimmy Flynn	Terry Kinsella	5–8	1982–1985
Terry Mitchell	Keith Meade	6–8	1983–1985
Diane Cooney	Julie-Ann Steel	6–8	1983–1985
Mandy Firth	Anita Savage	6–8	1983–1985
Sarah Wilks	Joanne Bell	6–8	1983–1985
Julie Marchant	Lisa York	6–10	1983–1987
Randir Singh	Kaka Singh	6–7	1983–1984
Jeremy Irvine	Vincent Matthews	6–7	1983–1984
Glenroy Glenroy	Steven Woodcock	6–7	1983–1984
Derick "Woody" Woods	Tony McPherson	6	1983
Kevin Baylon	Mmoloki Chrystie	7–9	1984–1986
Jackie Wright	Melissa Wilks	7–10	1984–1987
Jimmy McClaren	Gary Love	7	1984
Steven "Banksie" Banks	Tim Polley	8–10	1985–1987
Jane Bishop	Joann Kenny	8–11	1985–1988
Luke "Gonch" Gardner	John Holmes (later credited as John McMahon)	8–12	1985–1989
Paul "Hollo" Holloway	Bradley Sheppard	8–10	1985–1987
Robert "Robbie" Wright	John Alford	8–13	1985–1990
Trevor Cleaver	John Drummond	8–14	1985–1991
Vincent "Vince" Savage	Steve West	8–12	1985–1989
Veronica "Ronnie" Birtles	Tina Mahon	8–14	1985–1991
Caroline "Calley" Donnington	Simone Hyams	8–14	1985–1991
Helen Kelly	Ruth Carraway	8–12	1985–1989
Emma Stebson	Bonita Jones	8	1985
Julian Fairbrother	Douglas Chamberlain	8	1985
Imelda Davis	Fleur Taylor	9–10	1986–1987
Cheryl Webb	Amma Asante	9–10	1986–1987
Anthony "Ant" Jones	Ricky Simmonds	9–10	1986–1987
Laura Reagan	Fiona Mogridge (later credited as Fiona Lee-Fraser)	9–11	1986–1988
Julia Glover	Sara McGlasson (later credited as Sara Peters)	9–11	1986–1988
Danny Kendall	Jonathan Lambeth	9–12	1986–1989
Louise Webb	Alison McLaughlin	9–11	1986–1988
Eric "Ziggy" Greaves	George Wilson (later credited as George Christopher)	9–12	1986–1989
Georgina Hayes	Samantha Lewis	9–14	1986–1991
Freddie Mainwaring	Simon Vaughan	10–11	1987–1988
Fiona Wilson	Michelle Gayle	11–12	1988–1989
Francis "Mauler" McCaul	Joshua Fenton	11–13	1988–1990
Ted Fisk	Ian Congdon-Lee	11–15	1988–1992
Terence "Tegs" Ratcliffe	Sean Maguire	11–14	1988–1991
Matthew Pearson	Paul Adams (later credited as Paul Parris)	11–15	1988–1992
Susi Young	Lynne Radford	11–12	1988–1989
Christine "Chrissy" Mainwaring	Sonya Kearns	11–15	1988–1992
Clarke Trent	Darren Cudjoe	11–12	1988–1989
Justine Dean	Rachel Victoria Roberts	11–17	1988–1994
Mandy Freemont	Melanie Hiscock	12	1989
Aichaa Rashim	Veena Tulsiana	13	1990
Mike Bentley	René Zagger	13–14	1990–1991
Natalie Stevens	Julie Buckfield	13–16	1990–1993
Akik Rashim	Sundeep Suri	13–14	1990–1991
Neil Timpson	John Pickard	13–14	1990–1991
Kevin "Locko" Lockery	Otis Munyangiri	13–14	1990–1991
Alice Rowe	Alice Dawnay	13–15	1990–1992
Brian Shaw	Ian Steele	13–18	1990–1995
Russell "Jacko" Morgan	Jamie Lehane	13–19	1990–1996
Rebecca "Becky" Stevens	Natalie Poyser	13–19	1990–1996
Julie Corrigan	Margo Selby	13–19	1990–1996
Barry Timpson	David Shane	13–16	1990–1993
Fran Williams	Rebekah Joy Gilgan	14–16	1991–1993
Maria Watts	Luisa Bradshaw-White	14–17	1991–1994
Richard Hare	Desmond Askew	14–17	1991–1994
Robyn Stone	Nina Fry	14–19	1991–1996
Raymond "Ray" Haynes	Kelly George	14–16, 20–25	1991–1993, 1997–2002
Diane Richmond	Helena Meagher	15	1992
Frank Buttering	Christopher McGown	15–16	1992–1993
Graham "Grimbo" Pipe	Jamie Golding	15–16	1992–1993
Andy "Spanner" Walker	Zander Ward	15–16	1992–1993
Mick Daniels	Joseph Kpobie	15–16	1992–1993
Natasha Stevens	Clare Buckfield	15–16	1992–1993
Dennis "Techno" Morris	Alan Cave	15–21	1992–1998
Lauren Phillips	Melanie Joseph	15–21	1992–1998
Mary McCarthy	Helen McDonagh	16	1993
Gabriel Woods	Darren Kempson	16–19	1993–1996
Jodie Abadeyo	Natalie Tapper	16–19	1993–1996
Lucy Mitchell	Belinda Crane	16–21	1993–1998
Dudley Wesker	Steven Hammett	16–21	1993–1998
Paula Webster	Abigail Hart	17–19	1994–1996
Rachel Burns	Francesca Martinez	17–21	1994–1998
Josh Davis	Jamie Groves	17–21	1994–1998
Denny Roberts	Lisa Hammond	17–19	1994–1996
Jessica Arnold	Amy Phillips	17–21	1994–1998
Delia "Dill" Lodge	Rochelle Gadd	17–23	1994–2000
Sam Spalding	Kevin Bishop	17–18	1994–1995
James "Arnie" Arnold	Aidan J. David	17–24	1994–2001
Colin Brown	Colin Ridgewell	17–24	1994–2001
Joe Williams	Martino Lazzeri	17–19	1994–1996
Anna Wright	Jenny Long	17–19	1994–1996
Wayne Sutcliffe	Peter Morton	18–24	1995–2001
Kelly Bradshaw	Kate Bell	18–24	1995–2001
Sarah-Jane Webster	Laura Hammett	18–23	1995–2000
Kevin Jenkins	George Stark	18–22	1995–1999
Rick Underwood	Simon Long	18–19	1995–1996
Poppy Silver	Ayesha Antoine	18–21	1995–1998
Robert Buckley	Sam Powell	19–20	1996–1997
Joanna Day	Fiona Wade	19–21	1996–1998
Laurie Watson	Sian Welsh	19–21	1996–1998
Chris Longworth	Ben Freeman	19–21	1996–1998
Alec Jones	Thomas Carey	19–23	1996–2000
Carlene Joseph	Lorraine Woodley	20–21	1997–1998
Claire Sullivan	Tracey Murphy	20–21	1997–1998
Judi Jeffreys	Laura Sadler	20–22	1997–1999
Gemma Lyons	Maggie Mason	20–22	1997–1999
Evelyn Wright	Diana Magness	20–24	1997–2001
Tracy Long	Sally Morton	20–24	1997–2001
Tom Smith	Oliver Elmidoro	20–25	1997–2002
Lisa West	Charlotte McDonagh	20–25	1997–2002
Sam "Cracker" Bacon	Jonathan Marchant-Heatley	20–25	1997–2002
Matt Singleton	Robert Stuart	20–25	1997–2002
Nathan Charles	Marcel McCalla	20–25	1997–2002
Sean Pearce	Iain Robertson	21	1998
Sian O'Brien	Tilly Gerrard-Bannister	21	1998
Zoe Stringer	Jade Williams	21–22	1998–1999
Franco Savi	Francesco Bruno	21–23	1998–2000
Adam Hawkins	Sam Bardens	21–24	1998–2001
Max Abassi	Michael Obiora	21–25	1998–2002
Ian Hudson	John Joseph	21–27	1998–2004
Kamal Hussain	Taylor Scipio	22	1999
Becky Radcliffe	Emma Pierson	22	1999
Ben Miller	Daniel Lee	22–25	1999–2002
Darren Clarke	Adam Sopp	22–25	1999–2002
Amy Davenport	Lindsey Ray	22–26	1999–2003
Anika Modi	Jalpa Patel	22–27	1999–2004
Calvin Braithwaite	Arnold Oceng	22–27	1999–2004
Spencer Hargreaves	Colin White	22–28	1999–2005
Katy Fraser	Emma Waters	23–24	2000–2001
Briony Jones	Renee Montemayor	23–25	2000–2002
Danny Hartston	Max Brown	24–25	2001–2002
Kieran "Ozzie" Osbourne	Jon Newman	24–25	2001–2002
Clare Chaplin	Naomi Osei-Mensah	24–25	2001–2002
Vikki Meedes	Emma Willis	24–25	2001–2002
Shannon Parks	Amanda Fahy	24–27	2001–2004
Leah Stewart	Jessica Staveley-Taylor	24–26	2001–2003
Shona West	Sophie Shad	24–25	2001–2002
Josh Irvine	Shane Leonidas	24–27	2001–2004
Maddie Gilks	Kacey Barnfield	24–29	2001–2005
Martin Miller	Matthew Buckley	24–30	2001–2007
Kathy McIlroy	Sammy O'Grady	24–31	2001–2008
Carl Fenton	Reggie Yates	25	2002
Nick Edwards	Tom Graham	26–27	2003–2004
Mel Adams	Sarah Lawrence	26–27	2003–2004
Barry "Baz" Wainwright	Tom Hudson	26–30	2003–2007
Karen Young	Holly Quin-Ankrah	26–30	2003–2007
Max Humphries	James Wignall	26–30	2003–2007
Annie Wainwright	Lauren Bunney	26–30	2003–2007
Matthew "Mooey" Humphries	Jonathan Dixon	26–30	2003–2007
Emma Bolton	Daniella Fray	26–30	2003–2007
Andy Turner	Chris Crookall	26–30	2003–2007
Jeremy Bishop	Max Friswell	26–30	2003–2007
Abel Benson	Lucas Lindo	26–31	2003–2008
Patrick "Togger" Johnson	Chris Perry-Metcalf	26–31	2003–2008
Tanya Young	Kirsten Cassidy	26–31	2003–2008
Taylor Mitchell	Reece Noi	27–30	2004–2007
Dawn O'Malley	Hollie-Jay Bowes	28–29	2005
Katrina Simpson	Chantelle Latham	28–29	2005
Timothy "Tigger" Johnson	Jack McMullen	28–31	2005–2008
Ed Booth	Alex Sheldon	28–31	2005–2008
Sammy Lee	Holly Mai	28–31	2005–2008
Chloe Moore	Mia Smith	28–31	2005–2008
Andrea O'Malley	Darcy Isa	28–31	2005–2008
Alex Pickering	Josh Brown	28–31	2005–2008
Alison Simmons	Georgia May Foote	28–31	2005–2008
Donnie Briscoe	Rob Norbury	29–30	2005–2007
Holly Parsons	Rebecca-Anne Withey	29–30	2005–2007
Eleanor Smith	Amber Hodgkiss	29–30	2005–2007
Ross Duncan	Lewis Rainer	30	2007
Kyle Brown	Danny Miller	30	2007
Anna Duncan	Sacha Parkinson	30	2007
Ali Duncan	William Rush	30	2007
Jake Briggs	Lucien Laviscount	30–31	2007
Lucy Johnson	Daisy McCormick	30–31	2007
Rachel Towers	Grace Cassidy	30–31	2007
Bryn Williams	Joseph Slack	30–31	2007
Jenny Young	Naomi Richie	30–31	2007

== Staff ==
Character	Actor(s)	Position in School	1	2	3	4	5	6	7	8	9	10	11	12	13	14	15	16	17	18	19	20	21	22	23	24	25	26	27	28	29	30	31
Mr Tony "Old Mitch" Mitchell	Michael Percival	Geography Teacher; Form tutor to G1	Main	Main																													
Mr Parkes	Derek Anders	Woodwork Teacher	Guest																														
Mr Rankin	Blake Butler	Science Teacher	Guest																														
Mr Dan "Frosty" Foster	Roger Sloman	PE Teacher	Recurring																														
Mrs Schubert	Brenda Cavendish	PE Teacher	Recurring	Recurring																													
Mrs Monroe	Dorothea Phillips	Head of First Year	Main																														
Mr E. "Tweety Bird" Starling	Denys Hawthorne	Headmaster	Guest																														
Mr "Grumpy" Garfield	Graham Ashley	Caretaker	Main	Main	Main																												
Miss Pauline Clarke	Jill Dixon	Science Teacher	Recurring	Recurring																													
Mr Malcolm	Christopher Coll	Swimming Teacher	Guest																														
Miss June Mather	Carole Nimmons	Art Teacher	Main																														
Janet	Stella Haime	School secretary	Recurring	Recurring	Recurring	Recurring																											
Mr Geoff "Bullet" Baxter	Michael Cronin	PE Teacher; Deputy Headmaster (1986)		Main	Main	Main	Main	Main	Main	Main	Main																						
Mr Llewellyn	Sean Arnold	Headmaster		Main	Main																												
Mr Golightly	Anthony Dawes	Form Tutor to G3		Guest																													
Mr Graham "Sooty" Sutcliffe	James Wynn	English Teacher; Drama Teacher		Main	Main	Main	Main																										
Mr Keating	Robert Hartley	Maths Teacher; Deputy Headmaster		Main	Main	Main	Main	Main	Main																								
Miss June Summers (once referred to as Sheila Summers)	Philomena McDonagh	Art Teacher; Form tutor to R1		Main																													
Mrs Dunlop	Cleo Sylvestre	French Teacher		Guest																													
Mr Stuart "Hoppy" Hopwood	Brian Capron	Woodwork Teacher; Form tutor to R3 (1980–1981); Form tutor to H3 (1982); Form tutor to H4 (1983)			Main	Main	Main	Main																									
Miss Terri Mooney "The Loony"	Lucinda Gane	Science Teacher; Form tutor to H1 (1980–1981); Form tutor to N1 (1982); Form tutor to N2 (1983)			Main	Main	Main	Main																									
Miss Susie Peterson	Cheryl Branker	PE Teacher; Form tutor to G3 (1980–1981)			Main	Main																											
Mr John Curtis	Neville Barber	Head of First Year			Main	Main																											
Mrs Cooney	Maryann Turner	Cleaner			Recurring	Recurring																											
Mrs Hilary Thomas	Susan Porrett	Science Teacher			Main	Main	Main																										
Miss Brooks	Kara Noble	PE Teacher			Recurring	Recurring	Recurring																										
Miss Miles	Penny Brownjohn	Art Teacher			Guest																												
Mrs Maggie Kennedy	Nickola Sterne	Head of Third Year			Guest																												
Mr Chris Thomas	David Adams	School newspaper editor			Guest																												
Mrs Dunne	Myra Forsyth	Home Economics Teacher			Recurring																												
Miss Parsons	Susan Field	French Teacher			Guest																												
Mrs Bridget "The Midget" McCluskey	Gwyneth Powell	Headteacher (1981–1984, 1986–1991); Deputy Headteacher (1985)				Main	Main	Main	Main	Main	Main	Main	Main	Main	Main	Main																	
Mr "Tom-Tom" Thomson	Timothy Bateson	Caretaker				Main	Main																										
Miss Jenny "Sexy Lexi" Lexington	Allyson Rees	IT Teacher				Recurring	Recurring	Recurring	Recurring																								
Mr Hicks	Paul Jerricho	PE Teacher				Guest																											
Mrs Harris	Maggie Maxwell	Cleaner				Recurring																											
Mr Swindells	Christopher Reeks	History Teacher				Guest																											
Mrs Briscoe	Judy Franklin	Music Teacher				Guest																											
Mr Bill "Scruffy" McGuffy	Fraser Cains	English Teacher; Drama Teacher					Main	Main	Main																								
Mr Price	Andrew Hilton	IT Teacher					Guest																										
Miss Griffiths	Anni Domingo	Music Teacher					Recurring																										
Mrs Harvey	Sheila Mitchell	Home Economics Teacher					Guest																										
Miss O'Keefe	Penny Casdagli	School Councillor					Recurring																										
Mr Raynesford	Andy de la Tour	IT Teacher						Guest																									
Mr Lawrence Knowles	Chris Jury	History Teacher						Guest	Main																								
Mrs Jones	Rachel Davies	Science Teacher						Recurring	Recurring																								
Miss Saunders	Jennie Stoller	PE Teacher						Recurring																									
Mr Nick "Smartarse" Smart	Simon Heywood	English Teacher; Form tutor to H5 (1984); Head of First Year (1985)						Main	Main	Main																							
Mr Butterworth	Michael Graham Cox	History Teacher						Guest																									
Miss Clarke	Anne Kristen	Geography Teacher						Recurring																									
Mrs Gossage	Gillian Hanna	Typist Teacher						Guest																									
Mr Peter Howard	Michael Osborne	Head of Third Year							Main																								
Miss Caroline Gordon	Kara Wilson	Art Teacher; Form tutor to N3							Main																								
Miss Anne Hartley	Angela Newmarch	PE Teacher							Recurring																								
Mr Alan Devereaux	Dennis Blanch	Swimming Teacher							Guest																								
Nurse	Maggie Ollerenshaw	School nurse							Guest																								
Mr Maurice "Bronco" Bronson	Michael Sheard	French Teacher; Form tutor to N4 (1985); Form tutor to G3 (1986); Deputy Headteacher (1987–1989)								Main	Main	Main	Main	Main																			
Miss Ginny Booth	Karen Ford	Art Teacher; Form tutor to N1 (1988); Form tutor to N2 (1989); Form tutor to N3 (1990); Form tutor to N4 (1991)								Main	Main	Main	Main	Main	Main	Main																	
Mr Craig Mackenzie	Nicholas Donnelly	C.D.T Teacher; Form tutor to G1 (1988); Form tutor to G2; Form tutor to G3 (1990); Form Tutor to R1 (1992); Head of Second Year (1993)								Main	Main	Main	Main	Main	Main	Main	Main	Main															
Miss Gillie Washington "DC"	Caroline Gruber	English Teacher; Drama Teacher; Form tutor to E1 (1985)								Main																							
Mrs Moorcroft	Denyse Alexander	Sewing Mistress								Guest	Guest																						
Mr Humphries	Dennis Edwards	Headteacher								Recurring																							
Mr Peter McCartney	Tony Armatrading	Music Teacher								Main																							
Mrs Girling	Penny Leatherbarrow	Home Economics Teacher								Guest																							
Mr Dean	Sion Tudor Owen	English Teacher								Guest																							
Mrs Joseph	Tamara Ustinov	Manager of Transfer Students								Guest																							
Mr Legge	Ian Redford	Maths Teacher								Guest																							
Mr Eric Griffiths	George A. Cooper	Caretaker								Main	Main	Main	Main	Main	Main	Main	Main																
Mr Peter King	David Straun	Maths Teacher; Form tutor to E2 (1986)									Main	Guest																					
Mr Chris Kennedy	Jeffery Kissoon	English Teacher; Drama Teacher; Form Teacher to N5 (1986); Head of Third Year (1987)									Main	Main																					
Mrs Liz Reagan	Lucinda Curtis	PE Teacher; Head of Second Year (1986); Head of First Year (1988)									Main	Main	Main																				
Miss Roz Partridge	Karen Lewis	History Teacher; Head of Third Year (1986); Head of 6th Form (1987)									Main	Main																					
Mr Phil "Selina" Scott	Aran Bell	Science Teacher; Form Tutor to E3 (1987)										Main																					
Mr Peter Robson	Stuart Organ	PE Teacher; Geography Teacher; Form Tutor to E4 (1988); Form Tutor to E5 (1989); Deputy Headteacher (1993–1997); Headteacher (1998–2003)											Main	Main	Main	Main	Main	Main	Main	Main	Main	Main	Main	Main	Main	Main	Main	Main					
Mrs Margaret Stone	Madeline Church	History Teacher											Recurring	Recurring																			
Mrs Evans (Mrs Fitzgerald in 1990)	Susan Field	Home Economics Teacher											Recurring	Recurring	Recurring																		
Mr "Mad" Max Hargreaves	Kevin O'Shea	Deputy Headteacher													Main	Main	Main																
Mr Jeff Hankin	Lee Cornes	Science Teacher													Main	Main	Main	Main	Main	Main	Main	Main	Main	Main	Main	Main	Main						
Mrs Kate "Marilyn" Monroe	Anna Quayle	English Teacher; History Teacher; Form Tutor to R1 (1990); Form Tutor to R2 (1991); Form Tutor to R3 (1992); Form Tutor to R4 (1993); Head of First Year (1994)													Main	Main	Main	Main	Main														
Rod	Wayne Norman	Assistant Caretaker													Main																		
Mr Jan "The Man" Van Der Groot	William Brand	Maths Teacher														Main																	
Miss Percival	Janet Lees Price	Home Economics														Recurring																	
Mrs Angela Keele	Jenny Howe	Headteacher															Main	Main	Main														
Miss Patti Janowitz	Marita Black	English Teacher; Form tutor to N5															Main																
Mr Tom "Grizzly" Brisley	Adam Ray	Art Teacher															Main	Main	Main	Main	Main	Main	Main	Main									
Mr Malcolm Parrott	Peter Leeper	Maths Teacher; German Teacher; Form tutor to R2 (1993)																Main	Main	Main	Main												
Mr Dave Greenman	Paul Bigley	Caretaker																Main	Main	Main													
Mrs Siobhan Maguire	Karen O'Brien	School Secretary																	Main	Main	Main	Main	Main										
Miss Martha Jordan	Dena Davis	English Teacher																	Main														
Mr Paul Manyeke	Hakeem Kae-Kazim	Music Teacher																	Main														
Miss Jayne Carver	Sally Geoghegan	English Teacher																		Main	Main	Main	Main	Main	Main	Main	Main						
Mr Davies	Nigel Miles-Thomas	PE Teacher																		Main	Main												
Mr Russell Joseph	David Case	Caretaker																			Main	Main	Main										
Mr Christophe Urdy	Dominic Carrara	French Teacher																			Main		Main										
Mrs Margaret Holmes	Rachel Bell	History Teacher; Deputy Headteacher																				Main	Main	Main	Main	Main	Main						
Miss Betterton	Tam Hoskyns	School secretary																			Main	Main		Main	Main								
Madame Lefevre	Catherine Chevalier	French Teacher																			Main												
Mr Dai "Hard" Jones	Clive Hill	PE Teacher																				Main	Main	Main	Main	Main	Main						
Miss Emily Fraser	Judith Wright	Maths Teacher																							Main	Main	Main						
Mr Michael Barton	Nicholas Caunter	Geography Teacher																								Main	Main						
Mr Stephen Deverill	Nicholas Tizzard	Deputy Headteacher																									Main						
Mrs Bassinger	Jacqueline Boatswain	History Teacher; Deputy Headteacher (2003–2004); Headteacher (2005–2006)																										Main	Main	Main	Main		
Mr Chris Malachy	Edward Baker-Duly	PE Teacher; IT Teacher																										Main	Main	Main	Main		
Mr Wallace "Wally" Scott	Simon O'Brien	Caretaker																										Main	Main	Main	Main		
Miss Dyson	Nikki Grosse	Art Teacher; Form tutor to 7D (2003); Form tutor to 8D (2004)																										Main	Main				
Mrs Knuckle	Valerie Lilley	Food Technology Teacher																										Main	Main				
Mr Green	Celyn Jones	English Teacher																											Main				
Ms Lawrence	Louise Plowright	Teacher																												Main			
Miss Adams	Terri Dwyer	Geography Teacher																												Main	Main		
Mr Fox	Paul Orchard	Maths Teacher																												Main	Main		
Mr "Maccy-D" McDonnell	Paul Gilmore	Deputy Headteacher; Swimming Teacher; PE Teacher																												Main	Main	Main	Main
Miss Gayle	Cathy Tyson	Headteacher (2008)																														Main	Main
Taylor Mitchell	Reece Noi	Assistant Caretaker																														Main	
Miss Bettany	Kate Deakin	Teaching Assistant																															Main
Ms Hilda Rawlinson	Kim Hartman	Science Teacher																													Main	Main	Main
Kathy McIlroy	Sammy O'Grady	Deputy Manager of the Creative Learning Centre																															Main

- From 2003, there was a reluctance to give teachers' first names or to expand their roles in the show beyond teaching or keeping Students in line.
- Additionally, from around the mid-1990s, the number of teachers seen declined as their roles became more prominent, meaning that in the 2008 series there were only four members of staff (and only one actual teacher).
- Two former Students became staff members of Grange Hill in the show's final years. These were Taylor Mitchell, who became assistant caretaker, and Kathy McIlroy, who was appointed as a liaison officer to primary schools.

== Parents ==
Character	Actor(s)	Children	1	2	3	4	5	6	7	8	9	10	11	12	13	14	15	16	17	18	19	20	21	22	23	24	25	26	27	28	29	30	31
Mrs Preston	Peggy Sinclair	Judy Preston	Main	Main																													
Mrs Yates	Pamela Vezey	Carol, Trisha and Jenny Yates	Main	Main																													
Mrs Ruth Jenkins	Hilary Crane	Peter "Tucker" Jenkins	Main	Main	Main	Main																											
Mr Sam Green	Al Matthews	Benny and Michael Green		Main	Main																												
Mrs Green	Jumoke Debayo	Benny and Michael Green		Main																													
Mr George Karamanopolis	Alexis Mylonas	Antoni Karamanopolis		Main																													
Mrs Karamanopolis	Helen Bourne	Antoni Karamanopolis		Main																													
Mr John Hargreaves	Nigel Baguley	Gary and Cathy Hargreaves		Main																													
Mrs Hargreaves	Jo Anderson	Gary and Cathy Hargreaves		Main	Main																												
Mrs Hargreaves	Sheila Freeman	Gary and Cathy Hargreaves				Main																											
Councillor Doyle	David McKail	Michael Doyle		Main																													
Mrs Doyle	Amanda Reiss	Michael Doyle		Main																													
Mrs Stanton	Briony Hodge	Andrew and Karen Stanton		Main	Main	Main																											
Mr Tony McMahon	Bill Treacher	David and Susi McMahon		Main																													
Mrs McMahon	Maggie Riley	David and Susi McMahon		Main	Main	Main																											
Mrs Lewis	Jennifer Hill	Penny Lewis		Main																													
Mrs Edwards	Barbara Bermel	Tracy Edwards			Main																												
Mrs Patterson	Sylvia Carson	Douglas "Pogo" Patterson			Main																												
Mr Patel	Minoo Golvala	Sudhamani Patel			Main																												
Mr Albert Humphries	Tony Barton	Alan Humphries			Main	Main																											
Mrs Orpington	Christine Shaw	Duane Orpington			Main																												
Mrs Orpington	Deirdre Costello	Duane Orpington				Main																											
Mrs Stewart	Helen Cotterill	Christopher "Stewpot" Stewart				Main																											
Mr Leslie Scott	Malcolm Terris	Claire Scott				Main	Main	Main	Main																								
Mrs Ann Scott	Jennifer Piercey	Claire Scott				Main	Main	Main	Main																								
Mr Cartwright	Iain Rattray	Pamela and Matthew Cartwright					Main																										
Mrs Cartwright	Christine Akehurst	Pamela and Matthew Cartwright					Main																										
Mrs Zowkowski	Diana Ricardo	Belinda Zowkowski					Main																										
Mr Stewart	Mike Lewin	Christopher "Stewpot" Stewart					Main	Main	Main																								
Mr Browning	Mike Savage	Roland "Roly" Browning					Main	Main	Main	Main																							
Mrs Joyce Browning	Jo Kendall	Roland "Roly" Browning					Main	Main																									
Mrs McGuire	Jenny Twigge	Samuel "Zammo" McGuire					Main	Main	Main	Main	Main	Main																					
Mr Singh	Ahmed Khalil	Randir Singh						Main																									
Mrs Singh	Sheila Chitnis	Randir Singh						Main																									
Mrs Firman	Dorothy White	Annette Firman							Main																								
Mrs Gloria Cooney	Linda Marlowe	Diane Cooney							Main																								
Mr Bill Donnington	John Bleasdale	Caroline "Calley" Donnington (adoptive)								Main																							
Mrs Donnington	Deirdre Costello	Caroline "Calley" Donnington (adoptive)								Main	Main	Main	Main	Main	Main																		
Mrs Angela Selby	Jean Heard	Caroline "Calley" Donnington (birth)								Main																							
Mrs Fairbrother	Ann Curthoys	Julian Fairbrother								Main																							
Mrs Wilks	Cecily Hobbs	Sarah Wilks								Main																							
Mr Wright	Barry Summerford	Jackie and Robbie Wright								Main																							
Mrs Wallace	Zienia Merton	Eric Wallace								Main																							
Mrs St Clair	Alibe Parson	Janet St. Clair								Main																							
Mrs Jones	Elspeth Charlton	Ant Jones									Main																						
Mr Jones	Keith Drinkel	Ant Jones									Recurring																						
Mrs Gardener	Joanna Mackie	Luke "Gonch" Gardener									Main																						
Mr Martin Glover	Vincent Brimble	Julia and Steven Glover									Main	Main																					
Mrs Glover	Sarah Nash	Julia and Steven Glover									Main																						
Mrs Davis	Marcia King	Imelda Davis										Main																					
Mr Kendall	Chris Sanders	Danny Kendall										Main																					
Mrs Kendall	Jo Manning Wilson	Danny Kendall										Main	Main	Main																			
Mr Pearson	Bunny Losh	Matthew and Lucy Pearson											Main																				
Mrs Pearson	Julia Goodman	Matthew and Lucy Pearson											Main	Main	Main	Main																	
Mr Les Birtles	Geoffrey Beevers	Veronica "Ronnie" Birtles											Main	Main																			
Mrs Birtles	Angela Crow	Veronica "Ronnie" Birtles											Main	Main	Main																		
Mrs Young	Jenny Lee	Susi Young												Main																			
Mr Savage	Christopher Driscoll	Vincent "Vince" Savage												Main																			
Mr Ratcliffe	Alan Ford	Mark and Terence "Tegs" Ratcliffe												Main	Main																		
Mr Rashim	Raj Patel	Akik and Aichaa Rashim													Main	Main																	
Mrs Rashim	Chanda Sharma	Akik and Aichaa Rashim													Main	Main																	
Mr Bentley	David Cann	Mike Bentley													Main	Main																	
Mr Frank Glanville	Brian Croucher	Paul Glanville, Mark and Terence "Tegs" Ratcliffe (stepsons)													Main	Main																	
Mrs Rita Glanville	Cristina Avery	Mark and Terence "Tegs" Ratcliffe, Paul Glanville													Main	Main																	
Mrs Stevens	Janet Allen	Becky, Natalie and Natasha Stevens													Main	Main	Main																
Mr Shaw	David Streames	Brian Shaw														Main																	
Mrs Shaw	Helen Duvall	Brian Shaw														Main																	
Mr Ken Mainwaring	Vincent Pickering	Christine "Chrissy", Fred "Freddie" and Paula Mainwaring														Main	Main																
Mrs Mainwaring	Eliza Hunt	Christine "Chrissy", Fred "Freddie" and Paula Mainwaring														Main	Main																
Mrs Corrigan	Jo Warne	Julie Corrigan														Main	Main	Main	Main	Main	Main												
Mrs Lodge	Maria Warner	Delia "Dill" Lodge															Main	Main	Main	Main	Main	Main	Main	Main	Main								
Mr Phillips	Andrew Francis	Lauren and Andy Phillips																Main															
Mr Phillips	Don Warrington	Lauren and Andy Phillips																				Main											
Mrs Phillips	Lee Halliday	Lauren and Andy Phillips																Main															
Mrs Phillips	Claire Benedict	Lauren and Andy Phillips																				Main											
Mr Stone	Paul Ridley	Robyn Stone																Main															
Mrs Jenny Stone	Lois Butlin	Robyn Stone																Main	Main														
Mr Morgan	Jim Barclay	Russel "Jacko" Morgan																	Main														
Mrs Morgan	Sally Watts	Russel "Jacko" Morgan																	Main														
Mr Watts	John Arthur	Maria Watts																	Main														
Mr Jim Arnold	David Quilter	Jessica and James "Arnie" Arnold																	Main	Main	Main	Main	Main	Main	Main								
Mrs Caroline Arnold	Daryl Webster	Jessica and James "Arnie" Arnold																	Main	Main	Main												
Mr Morris	Tony Millan	Dennis "Techno" Morris																		Main													
Mrs Morris	Sharon Bower	Dennis "Techno" Morris																		Main													
Mrs Morris	Susannah Bray	Dennis "Techno" Morris																				Main											
Mr Jenkins	Geoff Lawson	Kevin Jenkins																		Main	Main												
Mrs Jenkins	Madelaine Newton	Kevin Jenkins																		Main	Main	Main	Main										
Mr Greg Mitchell	Tim Bentinck	Lucy Mitchell																		Main	Main	Main											
Mrs Silver	Delmozene Morris	Poppy Silver																			Main	Main	Main										
Mr Longworth	Stephen Earle	Chris and Elizabeth Longworth																			Main	Main	Main										
Mrs Longworth	Julie Foulds	Chris and Elizabeth Longworth																			Main	Main	Main										
Mrs Jeffreys	Theresa Streatfield	Judi, Harry and Jonathan Jeffreys																				Main	Main	Main									
Mrs Day	Patti Love	Eddie, David and Joanna Day																					Main										
Mrs Sutcliffe	Brenda Ford	Wayne Sutcliffe																					Main										
Mrs Singleton	Ann Davies	Matt Singleton																					Main	Main									
Mr Hudson	Dean Harris	Ian Hudson																					Main	Main	Main	Main	Main						
Mrs Savi	Susan Henry	Franco and Fabio Savi																						Main									
Mr Abassi	Wale Ojo	Max Abassi																						Main									
Mr Radcliffe	Giles Watling	Becky Radcliffe																						Main									
Mrs Annie Radcliffe	Alison Rose	Becky Radcliffe																						Main									
Mrs Hattie Davenport	Jenny Galloway	Amy Davenport																						Main	Main	Main	Main	Main					
Mrs Webster	Susan Beresford	Paula, Sarah-Jane and Kimberley Webster																						Main									
Mrs Braithwaite	Doreen Ingleton	Calvin Braithwaite																						Main									
Mr Hawkins	Steve Weston	Adam Hawkins																							Main								
Mr Fraser	Stephen Tiller	Emily and Katy Fraser																							Main								
Mrs Modi	Sakuntala Ramanee	Anika and Amit Modi																							Main	Main	Main						
Mr Modi	Tanveer Ghani	Anika and Amit Modi																							Main								
Mr Don West	Simon Pearsall	Lisa and Shona West																								Main	Main						
Mrs Sally West	Suzy Aitchison	Lisa and Shona West																								Main							
Mr Miller	Peter Temple	Ben and Martin Miller																								Main							
Mrs Miller	Jacqueline Bucknell	Ben and Martin Miller																								Main							
Suzie Gilks	Sara Stockbridge	Maddie Gilks																									Main						
Mr Stewart	Malcolm Tomlinson	Leah Stewart																										Main					
Mrs Stewart	Natalie Forbes	Leah Stewart																										Main					
Mr Owen Wainwright	Mark Entwhistle	Barry "Baz" and Annie Wainwright																										Main	Main	Main			
Mrs Wainwright	Fionnuala Ellwood	Barry "Baz" and Annie Wainwright																										Main	Main				
Mrs Bolton	Gillian Perry	Emma Bolton																											Main	Main	Main	Main	
Mr Bolton	Philip Hazelby	Emma Bolton																												Main			
Mr Benson	Danny Lawrence	Abel and Theo Benson																												Main			
Mr Pickering	Nigel Betts	Alex Pickering																														Main	
Mrs Margaret McIlroy	Cally Lawrence	Kathy McIlroy																														Main	
Mrs Moore	Kerry McGregor	Chloe Moore																															Main
Mr Johnson	Danny McCall	Patrick "Togger", Timothy "Tigger" and Lucy Johnson																															Main
