= Grange Hill series 1 =

Season of television series

Grange Hill
- Season 1
- No. of episodes: 9

Release
- Original network: BBC One
- Original release: 8 February – 5 April 1978

Season chronology
- Next → Series 2

The first series of the British television drama series Grange Hill began broadcasting on 8 February 1978, before ending on 5 April 1978 on BBC One. The series follows the lives of the staff and Students of the eponymous school, an inner-city London comprehensive school. It consists of nine episodes.

== Cast and characters ==
=== Students ===
- Todd Carty as Tucker Jenkins
- George Armstrong as Alan Turner/Humphries
- Michelle Herbert as Trisha Yates
- Terry Sue-Patt as Benny Green
- Robert Craig-Morgan as Justin Bennett
- Vincent Hall as Michael Doyle
- Donald Waugh as Joseph Hughes
- Abigail Brown as Judy Preston
- Lucinda Duckett as Ann Wilson
- James Jebbia as Tommy Watson
- Ckive Gehle as Adrian Jones
- Carol Daniels as Margaret Shaw
- Kim Benson as Mary Johnson
- Julia Gale as Carol Yates
- Miriam Mann as Jackie Heron
- Kim Neve as Lucy
- Karen Snow as Brenda
- Hubert Clarke as Terry O’Brian
- George Armstrong as Alan Humphries

=== Teachers ===
- Michael Percival as Mr Tony Mitchell
- Brenda Cavendish as Mrs Shubert
- Stella Haime as Janet
- Graham Ashley as Mr Garfield
- Jill Dixon as Miss Pauline Clarke
- Dorothea Phillips as Mrs Monroe
- Carole Nimmons as Miss Mather
- Christopher Coll as Mr Malcolm
- Denys Hawthorne as Mr Starling
- Roger Sloman as Mr Dan Foster
- Derek Anders as Mr Parkes
- Blake Butler as Mr Rankin

== Episodes ==
No.	Episode	Writer	Director	Original airdate
1	Episode One New School	Phil Redmond	Colin Cant	8 February 1978
The new comprehensive looks intimidating to Justin Bennett and Judy Preston. Trisha Yates makes it clear that she's not putting up with any nonsense from Tucker Jenkins and Ann Wilson has some difficulty finding the school at all. First appearances: Benny Green, Peter "Tucker" Jenkins, Alan Humphries, Justin Bennett, Ann Wilson, Tommy Watson, Trisha Yates, Carol Yates, David Lewis, Mr Tony "Old Mitch" Mitchell, Mr "Frosty" Foster, Mr Rankin, Margaret Shaw, Mary Johnson, Jackie Heron, Brenda, Lucy, Mrs Monroe and Mr Garfield.
2	Episode Two Football	Phil Redmond	Colin Cant	15 February 1978
When Benny Green kicks his football across the path of Mr. Mitchell's car, the teacher tells him off for being careless. Relenting a little, Mr. Mitchell asks if Benny will be trying for the team, but Benny tells him he has no football boots. In P.E, Mr. Foster makes it clear the correct gear must be worn, but Benny's still trying to find the right place – after embarrassingly getting undressed in what turns out to be the girls changing room, he does find the gym.
3	Episode Three Bullies	Phil Redmond	Colin Cant	22 February 1978
Judy is unhappy because she has no friends, but Trisha sticks up for her when Tucker playfully plays Piggy in the Middle with Judy's satchel. Outside, Jackie Heron and her cronies demand money with menaces, but find Judy's 20p insufficient. Jackie takes Judy's precious fountain pen as security against 75p to be brought the next day. The next day, Jackie finds Judy outside near the sweet shop, and insists she goes home to get the money – but Trisha is also watching with her sister Carol.
4	Episode Four Swimming	Phil Redmond	Colin Cant	1 March 1978
When Form One Alpha's boys go swimming, Tucker hides Justin's trousers. Mr. Mitchell appeals to the class for information about the missing apparel. "Are you sure you put them on this morning?" asks Benny innocently. There's another swimming lesson for the boys the next day, due to staff limitations. Early on, proceedings come to a halt when Winkle Graham cuts his toe on a loose tile, and the boys sent back to change. Benny goes back to the pool to recover his missing medal, but Tucker can't resist extending their stay. Tucker and Benny use the benches as improvised boats and race each other the length of the pool. First appearances: Mr Malcolm
5	Episode Five Hamster	Phil Redmond	Colin Cant	8 March 1978
Trisha won't admit to her family that she has a crush on Mr. Rankin, nevertheless it is true that she helps the biology teacher out in the lab at lunchtimes cleaning the test tubes and cages. In the lunch hour, intent on doing a magazine article about the school animals, Judy visits the biology lab and finds Trisha there. Against her better judgement, Trisha lets Judy look at the grey school hamster, but it escapes when the bossy Miss Clark suddenly enters. Trisha earns a detention for her earrings. In trying to corner the creature, Trisha and Judy bring down a bookcase. Judy decides they can replace the animal, and Trisha remembers she has school holiday money. Judy runs to buy a hamster from the nearby pet shop while Trisha tidies up the lab.
6	Episode Six Woodwork	Phil Redmond	Colin Cant	15 March 1978
Benny finally is able to go to school with the proper blazer. In woodwork, Tucker challenges Benny to go with him to visit an old ammunition dump; Justin, wanting to prove he is no chicken, agrees to go too. Tucker leads them through the site, but they are disappointed to find it is just a derelict house next to a junkyard. Wandering around, the trio get stuck in a room, with weird sounds nearby. They break down the door to find it was just a cat, which scampers. Upstairs is a lifting trolley, which Tucker uses to give Benny and Justin rides, but outside, a truck is heading in their direction with workmen inside. Tucker, Benny and Justin realize they will be seen leaving from the front, so scale the wall at the rear. It is no use – the workmen have seen them, but Justin is still climbing the ladder and has nowhere to go; he falls backwards with a yell.
7	Episode Seven Votes	Phil Redmond	Colin Cant	22 March 1978
Judy and Trisha speculate that Miss Mather is seeing Mr. Mitchell. It is time to elect representatives to the school council, but to start with each form has to come up with likely candidates. Mr. Mitchell tells his form that the possibilities are Trisha, Tucker and Ann, although some unlikely other options are Snoopy, the Six Million Dollar Man and "our budgie". Trisha immediately wants to opt out, while Ann, with support from both Judy and Trisha, suggests that Tucker is an inappropriate choice, because he messes around. A fourth choice materializes in the form of new boy Doyle, whose credentials include having a father on the local council, but who has a history of bad behaviour. Form One Alpha easily votes in Ann to be their candidate, and then the campaigns get started. First appearances: Michael Doyle
8	Episode Eight Gun	Phil Redmond	Colin Cant	29 March 1978
While chasing after Benny, Doyle knocks over some paint and gets into trouble. Trisha Yates' stripy socks earn her a detention. Doyle's eyes light up when he sees valuable flintlocks on loan to the school: he and his friend grab one of them, brushing past Tucker as they escape. With Form One Alpha under suspicion the head suspends the impending school festival unless the valuable object is returned. Tucker tells Doyle he knows it was him, but Doyle won't admit the truth – Trisha overhears and gets Mary and Ann involved, but the girls aren't entirely sure Tucker is trustworthy. Doyle is sent to Coventry: it is made clear that no-one wants to know him, and before long he's fighting Tucker. After a week, it is clear more action is needed – it is suggested that an amnesty is set up, allowing an anonymous return of the pistol. Ann tells Mr. Mitchell and the Head of First Year, Mrs Monroe, and the Headmaster agrees. Doyle gets beaten up by Tucker, Benny and Alan. Final appearance: Miss Monroe
9	Episode Nine Truant	Phil Redmond	Colin Cant	5 April 1978
Both Benny and Trisha are disillusioned with Grange Hill – Benny, because he gets called names like "gollywog" by the likes of Doyle, and Trisha because the rules about uniform are, to her mind, very strict. When Trisha wears nail varnish, Mr. Mitchell won't take any more excuses, and tells her he's going to write to her mother. When the letter arrives, Trisha takes it herself, but she knows she is only delaying the inevitable. On Monday, neither Benny nor Trisha are present at registration, although Benny was seen before school began. Ann knocks on Trisha's door at lunchtime – her mother is unaware that Trisha is not at school. Mr. Mitchell overhears Ann and Mary talking, and with Miss Mather taking his tutorial, as he goes out to try to find the lost sheep. Last appearances: Ann Wilson, David Lewis, Anthony Underwood, Mr Rankin, Mr "Frosty" Foster, Margaret Shaw, Mr Malcolm, and Miss Mather

== DVD release ==
The first series of Grange Hill was released on DVD in the UK in 2007. The set includes all nine episodes.
