= Settling In =

Settling In may refer to:

- "Settling In" (Doctor in the House), a 1969 television episode
- "Settling In" (Grange Hill), a 1982 television episode
