= Tucker's Luck =

British television series (1983–1985)

- Title card
- Genre: Drama
- Starring: Todd Carty; George Armstrong
- Country of origin: United Kingdom
- Original language: English
- No. of series: 3
- No. of episodes: 27

Production
- Producer: David Hargreaves (1984–1985)
- Running time: 25 minutes

Original release
- Network: BBC2
- Release: 10 March 1983 – 17 December 1985

Related
- Grange Hill

Tucker's Luck is a British television drama series made by the BBC between 1983 and 1985.

The series is a spin-off from the school drama Grange Hill and capitalised on the popularity of one of the series' original characters – Peter "Tucker" Jenkins, played by Todd Carty.

Tucker's Luck followed the exploits of Tucker and his friends, Alan Humphries (George Armstrong) and Tommy Watson (Paul McCarthy), after they had left school and their attempts to find employment and cope out there in the "real world". Three series were made (although by Series Three, Tommy was gone – his absence explained by his having decided to join the Navy), with several former Grange Hill cast members reprising their roles for the spin-off (such as Linda Slater as Susi MacMahon, Alan's former school girlfriend, in Series One; Michelle Herbert as Tucker's old class enemy Trisha Yates in the final episode of Series Three) and Peter McNamara as Tucker's nemesis (and subsequently friend) Ralph Passmore (in Series One and Two), although the programme never came close to matching the popularity of Grange Hill.

The third and final series saw the first appearances of Tucker's younger sister, eight-year-old Rhona (who had never been seen previously), and Tucker's elder brother Barry (frequently mentioned by Tucker, albeit only as "our kid", in Grange Hill).

== Series and episode guide ==
- Series 1 consisted of nine episodes, broadcast from 10 March 1983
- Series 2 consisted of nine episodes, broadcast from 13 March 1984
- Series 3 consisted of nine episodes, broadcast from 22 October 1985

As of 2020, the series has not been released on DVD and according to the BBC Genome Project has not been rebroadcast since its original airing.

== Books ==
Two annuals and three novels associated with the series were published between 1983 and 1985. The annuals were simply called the 1984 Tucker's Luck Annual and 1985 Tucker's Luck Annual. The novels were:

1. Forty Days of Tucker J., by Robert Leeson. Published by Fontana Lions in 1983.
2. Tucker's Luck, by Jan Needle. Published by Fontana Lions in 1984.
3. Tucker in Control, by Jan Needle. Published by Magnet in 1985.
