= Jan Needle =

British writer (1943–2023)

James Albert Needle (8 February 1943 – 9 October 2023), known as Jan Needle, was an English author. He wrote over thirty novels, as well as books and plays for adults and children, books of criticism, cartoons and radio and television serials and series.

== Biography ==
James Albert Needle was born on 8 February 1943 in Portsmouth, where he also grew up, coming from a family with strong naval and military connections. After studying to becoming a journalist and despite poor grades in English, he moved to the northwest of England at age 20 to work for the Daily Herald newspaper. At 25 he took a Drama degree course at Manchester University, quitting full-time journalism after working for various papers. His first novel, Albeson and the Germans, was published in 1977. His first work for television was the one-hour drama A Place of Execution.

In his early career, Needle wrote three books related to the popular BBC television series Grange Hill and its spin-off series Tucker's Luck which ran for three series from 1982 to 1984.

His best-selling novel is The Bully, which has been translated into multiple languages and is a set text in schools in South America. The Times Education Supplement said it "avoids the glib answers of formulaic fiction". The TES also recommended it for classroom use to tackle the topic of bullying.

Needle also wrote a parallel to The Wind in the Willows, called Wild Wood, which retells the story from the perspective of the stoats and weasels who rebel against the established social order, thus offering a critique of the politically conservative message of Kenneth Grahame's novel.

Needle was also co-author with Peter Thomson of Brecht, a study of the playwright Bertolt Brecht.

Needle wrote serials for television, such as Truckers, A Game of Soldiers, Behind the Bike Sheds and Soft Soap, and also wrote episodes for various well-known series, including Count Duckula, Thomas the Tank Engine, Sooty and Sweep, Brookside and The Bill.

Latterly, Needle re-wrote classic novels, to make them more accessible for children. In 2004, his cut down version of Bram Stoker's Dracula was published, being praised by Publishers Weekly for its presentation with blood-red page borders and "haunting" illustrations. It was followed in the next few years by a translated and adapted version of The Hunchback of Notre-Dame and a re-working of Moby-Dick.

Needle lived in Uppermill, Saddleworth, near Oldham and West Didsbury, Manchester in the northwest of England, and had five children. He died in Heald Green, Manchester on 9 October 2023, at the age of 80.

== Controversy ==
Some of his works have caused controversy:

- Don't Tell The Frogs, a comedy focusing on the nuclear industry, was pulled after pressure.
- The British government attempted to block the running of the television serial A Game of Soldiers (broadcast as part of schools series Middle English in September and October 1983), due to its subject of the Falklands War.
- Needle was banned from acting as the keynote speaker at a conference on realism in children's books by teachers due to his book My Mate Shofiq.
- His novel Death Order speculated that leading German Nazi Rudolf Hess was murdered.

== Bibliography ==
- Albeson and the Germans (1977)
- My Mate Shofiq (1978)
- The Size Spies (1979)
- The Bee-Rustlers (1980)
- A Sense of Shame and Other Stories (1980)
- Wild Wood (1981)
- Another Fine Mess (1981)
- Losers Weepers (1981)
- Piggy in the Middle (1982)
- Going Out (1982)
- A Pitiful Place and Other Stories (1984)
- Great Days at Grange Hill (1984)
- Tucker's Luck (1984)
- Tucker in Control (1985)
- Behind the Bike Sheds (1985)
- Wagstaffe, the Wind-up Boy (1987)
- Uncle in the Attic (1988)
- The War of the Worms (1992)
- Bogeymen (1992)
- The Bully (1993)
- Killing Time at Catterick (2013)
- Silver and Blood (2013)
- Death Order (2015)
- Kicking Off (2015)
- Nelson: The Poisoned River (2015)

William Bentley

1. A Fine Boy for Killing (1979)
2. The Wicked Trade (1998)
3. The Spithead Nymph (2004)
4. Undertaker's Wind (2006)

Charlie Raven

1. The Devil's Luck (2013)
2. The Death Card (2015)

=== Plays ===
- A Game of Soldiers (1985)
- Rebels of Gas Street (1986)
- The Thief (1989)

=== Literary criticism ===
- Brecht (1981) – with Peter Thomson
