= Dorothea Phillips (actress) =

Welsh actress (born 1928)

- Born: Dorothea Melisande Elizabeth Gwenllian Phillips; 5 September 1928 (age 97); Rhondda, Wales
- Education: Aberystwyth University, Wales
- Occupation: Actress
- Known for: 102 Dalmatians; Under Milk Wood

Dorothea Melisande Elizabeth Gwenllian Phillips (born 5 September 1928), known as Dottie, is a Welsh actress, best known for her roles in the radio, theatre and film versions of Under Milk Wood and 102 Dalmatians (2000). She appeared in the first stage production of T. S. Eliot's 1958 play The Elder Statesman, at the Edinburgh Festival.

== Early life and education ==
Dorothea Phillips was the daughter of Canon W D Phillips, vicar of Cwmtillery. She had one sister. She studied English at Aberystwyth University followed by law, with the intention of becoming a barrister, about which she said, "I found law lessons so tedious that I spent most of my time in the university dramatic society." She was vice-chair of Abertillery Council's Entertainments Committee and vice-chair of the Students' Representative Council.

== Career ==
After graduation her first position in theatre was as an assistant stage manager, after which she joined a repertory company as an actor. She went on to appear in theatre, radio, film and television.

=== Theatre ===
Year	Production	Company / Location
1947	Dangerous Corner	Liverpool Warehousing Company
1949	Hayfever	The New Garrick Players
1953	Pardon my Claws	Theatre Royal, Huddersfield
1953	Maiden Ladies	Theatre Royal, Huddersfield
1953	Pink String and Sealing Wax	Theatre Royal, Huddersfield
1954	The Sleeping Prince	Windsor Repertory Company
1955	Under Milk Wood	Theatre Royal, Newcastle
1955	The Love Match	Brighton Royal
1957	Doctor Angelus	Edinburgh Gateway Company
1957	The Deep Blue Sea	Curzon Productions
1957	Flare Path	Lyceum Theatre, London
1957	George and Margaret	Curzon Productions
1958	The Hamlet of Stepney Green	Oxford Playhouse Company
1961	The Norman Wisdom Show	Alhambra Theatre, Bradford
1961	The Cupboard	Alhambra Theatre, Bradford
1965	The Living Room	Malvern Festival Theatre, Malvern
1967	The Anniversary	Palace Theatre, Watford
1967	Busybody	Marlowe Theatre
1976	Mother's Day	Royal Court, London
1978	The Boy Friend	Richmond Theatre

== Radio ==
- 1963: Under Milk Wood (BBC) with Richard Burton, about which Phillips said "Some people said there was a melancholy to Richard's voice but the Welsh are melancholy by nature. It's the quality of hwyl – a word which doesn't quite translate into English. At times Richard had it."
- 1966: This Little Piggy (BBC)
- 1967: The White Sparrow (BBC)

=== Film ===
Year	Title	Role
1962	The Lamp in Assassin Mews	Mrs Burke
1963	The Cage	
1964	Under Milk Wood	Mrs Ogmore -Pritchard
1967	The Story of the Airship	Housekeeper
1970	Carry On Loving	Aunt Beatrice Grubb
1972	Under Milk Wood	Mrs Dai Bread One
1972	Commuter Husbands	Wife
1979	The Corn is Green	Sarah Pugh
1979	S.O.S. Titanic	Emma Bucknell
1980	Heartland	
1985	Santa Claus: The Movie	Miss Tucker
1986	The Canterville Ghost	Aunt Gretchen
1986	Duet for One	Betty
1987	Y Gwyliau (The Holiday)	Mother
1988	Olympus Force	Mrs Grossopoulos
2000	102 Dalmatians	Mrs Mirthless

=== Television ===
Year	Title	Role	Notes
1960	The Citadel		
1962	The Saint	Mrs Barnes	1 episode
1963	Dixon of Dock Green		1 episode: Christmas Dip
1965	Secret Agent		1 episode: Whatever happened to George Foster
1966	Out of the Unknown	Nurse	1 episode: Frankenstein Mark II
1966	The Newcomers	Mrs Hartley	1 episode
1966	Sexton Blake	Mrs Bardell	Series 1
1968	One of the family		15 episodes
1969	Life with Cooper		1 episode
1970	The Hero of My Life... Charles Dickens	Mrs Hogarth	1 episode
1970	Choir Practice	Mrs Lloyd	Musical play, BBC 2
1971	Once Upon a Time	Narrator	1 episode
1972	The Black Arrow	Mistress Hatch	13 episodes
1972	The Gravediggers		1 episode
1972	Jason King	Mrs Edwards	1 episode: It's Too Bad About Auntie
1975	The Little Match Girl	First spinster	1 episode
1976	Thriller		1 episode: The Next Victim
1977	Hogg's Back	Mrs Biggle	1 episode
1978	Grange Hill	Mrs Monroe	Series 1
1980	The Further Adventures of Oliver Twist	Mrs Bedwin	
1983	Agatha Christie's Partners in Crime	ABC Waitress	1 episode: The Sunningdale Mystery
1983	Jane Eyre	Lady Lynn	
1984	It's Max Boyce	Gran	4 episodes
1986	All at No 20	Miss Godfrey	1 episodes
1986	If Tomorrow Comes	Brunhilda	3 parts
1986	Agatha Christie		1 episode: Dead Man's Folly
1987	The New Statesman	Mrs Mumford	1 episode
1988	Shadow on the Sun	Nurse	
1989	Agatha Christie's Poirot	Nelly Morgan	Problem at sea
1990	She-Wolf of London	Aunt Elsa	20 episodes
1991	The House of Eliott	Lady Cravenhurst	1 episode
1991	Love and Curses	Aunt Elsa	1 episode: Curiosity Killed the Cravitz
1996	Screen Two		1 episode Century
1999	Home Farm Twins		

Also Dixon of Dock Green, No Hiding Place and Danger Man.

== Soho, London ==
In the 1960s, because of her legal qualification, Phillips held the licence to various bars in London's Soho, including the Irving, the Iron Lung, the Buckstone and the Kismet, where patrons included Terence Stamp, Albert Finney, David Hockney and Francis Bacon. In 2019 and 2021 Phillips was interviewed about her time spent in Soho.
