= David Hargreaves =

David Hargreaves is the name of:

- David Hargreaves (actor) (born 1940), English actor
- David Hargreaves (academic) (born 1939), English academic
- Dave Hargreaves (1954–2018), English footballer for Accrington Stanley and Blackburn Rovers
