= Togger Johnson =

Grange Hill Character

Patrick 'Togger' Johnson
- Grange Hill character
- Portrayed by: Chris Perry-Metcalf
- Duration: 2003–2008
- First appearance: 28 January 2003
- Last appearance: 15 September 2008
- Introduced by: Phil Redmond
In-universe information
- Occupation: Pupil (2003–2008)
- Mother: Rhona Jenkins
- Brothers: Timonthy 'Tigger' Johnson
- Sisters: Lucy Johnson
- Grandfathers: Mr Jenkins
- Grandmothers: Mrs Jenkins
- Uncles: Barry Jenkins; Peter "Tucker" Jenkins

Patrick "Togger" Johnson is a fictional character in CBBC's long series drama Grange Hill. The character is played by Chris Perry-Metcalf. He is the nephew of former student, Peter "Tucker" Jenkins.

== History ==
When Togger started in Grange Hill in year 7 he found himself to be a prankster with best mates Abel and Andy. Pranking school headmaster Mr Mcdonald and arch rival Tanya Young.

In year 8 Togger hears about the Grange Hill time capsule from Uncle Peter and is determined to find it. Wally catches the lads digging up the school lawn; and the quest lands them in trouble during cross-country. Togger and Abel interview Bill Winston, the oldest surviving Grange Hill pupil, for their class presentation. They do not bother to do any work and discover Bill has died when they make a return visit. Togger agonises whether to tell Andy about Emma, and when events overtake them Andy is furious Togger kept quiet.

In year 9 Togger worries he'll be seriously embarrassed by little brother Tigger and his worries prove justified after an eventful Year 7 induction day. Togger is devastated when he fails to get into the football academy, but the demands it places on Abel almost destroys their friendship. Togger rescues Tanya from her abductor and the pair begin to develop an understanding.

In year 10 it's another hectic year for Togger, he, Andy and Abel find themselves locked in a shed full of wild animals when Togger should be in "detention" filming a wedding video with Tanya. Togger is challenged to improve the state of the school toilets; no-one is interested in his crusade and even Andy tells him to throw in the towel. At the end of the year brand-spanking new loos are opened - Togger is pleased with himself. Tanya is elected school rep unopposed when Togger nominates her. Togger and Tanya share a tender moment on the last day of term; Tanya waits for him after school but he's too busy sorting out Tigger's scrape with Mooey. As Tanya walks off into the sunset, Togger is gutted at missing his chance.

Year 11 proves to be Togger's most traumatic year at Grange Hill. As if having Tigger at the same school weren't bad enough his sister Lucy has now joined them and to make matters worse she instantly takes a disliking to Tanya's sister Jenny which causes friction between Togger and Tanya. Andy then announces that his parents have withdrawn him from Grange Hill to send him to private school and get him away from Togger whom they consider a bad influence. Tanya meanwhile seems to be dating an older guy much to Togger's chagrin. In an attempt to get Tanya out of his system Togger turns his attentions to Anna Duncan, a year nine girl. At first things seem to go well but when Togger thinks that Baz Wainwright is showing an interest as well he sees history repeating itself after Baz's brief relationship with Tanya the previous year. Togger starts to show resentment and jealousy towards Baz which culminates in football practice when Togger takes his anger out on Baz with a bad tackle which sends Baz crashing to the ground where he stays. When Mr MacDonald examines him he finds that Baz has died. Togger is mortified by what he believes to be the result of his actions and stays away from school for several days unable to face people, especially Baz's girlfriend Holly and best mate Donny Briscoe who blames Togger for Baz's death. Tanya goes to see Togger and the two have a heart to heart which seems to bring them closer. She persuades Togger to return to school but despite the post-mortem showing that Baz's death was nothing to do with Togger but rather a heart defect Donny and several others still blame Togger. Towards the end of the year Togger decides to make a clean break at the end of the year and get away from Grange Hill when his Uncle Peter (Tucker Jenkins) offers him a job on a building site in Germany. He begins to rethink however when he and Tanya share a kiss. On the last day of school Togger is shocked when he is awarded the new Baz Wainwright trophy and Donny finally admits he was wrong for blaming Togger for Baz's death. Togger and Tanya attend the prom together officially as boyfriend and girlfriend and Togger decides to stay on at Grange Hill for sixth form.
