= Nicholas Pandolfi =

British actor and radio presenter (born 1970)

- Born: Woodbridge, Suffolk, England
- Presenting career
- Station: TOWN 102
- Style: Breakfast show
- Country: United Kingdom
- Website: www.nicholaspandolfi.co.uk

Nicholas Pandolfi (born 16 January 1970) is an English actor, voice artist & radio presenter, who has worked for the BBC and Global Radio (HEART). He was named BBC Local Radio "Presenter of the Year" at the 2004 Frank Gillard Awards and won the bronze in the category in 2006 for his work at BBC Radio Suffolk. He left the station in 2007.

He has presented the breakfast programme at Town 102 in Ipswich, Suffolk since 2011. He has previously worked with SGR FM, BBC Radio Suffolk and London's Liberty Radio.

He played the character Matthew Cartwright in 12 episodes of the BBC children's television series Grange Hill between 1981 and 1982. In 1989 he appeared in the film Reunion.
