= Lucinda Gane =

British actress (1949–2005)

- Born: Lucinda Catherine Gane; 20 October 1949; Union of South Africa
- Died: 6 October 2005 (aged 55); Camden, London, UK
- Occupation: Actress
- Years active: 1975–1998
- Spouse(s): David Cann (1972–??; divorced); Christopher Reid (1976–2005; her death)

Lucinda Gane (20 October 1949 – 6 October 2005) was a South African-born British actress, known for her role as the absent-minded science teacher Miss Terri Mooney in the children's television serial Grange Hill, a role she played from 1980 to 1983. In 1985–1986 she played Georgie Pillson's trusty housemaid Foljambe in two series of Mapp and Lucia, adapted by London Weekend Television from the novels of E. F. Benson. She also appeared in Thomas and Sarah, a spin-off from Upstairs, Downstairs, playing Emily Rudge.

She married David Cann in 1972, later divorcing before marrying the poet Christopher Reid. Following Gane's death from a brain tumour in 2005, Reid began writing a collection of poems in tribute to his late wife. Titled A Scattering, this volume won the £30,000 Costa Book Award in 2010.
