= Rudi Davies =

English actress (born 1965)

- Born: Ruth Emmanuella Davies; 24 March 1965 (age 61)
- Years active: 1982–1995

Ruth Emmanuella "Rudi" Davies (born 24 March 1965) is an English actress, the daughter of writer Dame Beryl Bainbridge (1932–2010).

== Career ==
Davies began her acting career as Penny Lewis in the BBC school drama, Grange Hill. She appeared there from 1979 to 1982. She did not return for Series 4, due to filming Forever Young. Her character was written out, stated to have had a horse riding accident offscreen. She reappeared, alongside the rest of the original cast, in a single episode of Series 5.

She appeared opposite David Thewlis in Resurrected (1989), and appeared in A Sense of Guilt. She was later cast in The Object of Beauty (1991) alongside John Malkovich and Andie MacDowell which received a mediocre reception from critics, and the 1995 film Frankie Starlight.

Davies is married to actor and writer Mick Ford.

== Filmography ==
Film roles
Year	Film	Role	Notes
1983	Forever Young	Suzie	Credited as Ruth Davies
1987	The Lonely Passion of Judith Hearne	Mary	
1989	Resurrected	Julie	
1991	The Object of Beauty	Jenny	
1995	Frankie Starlight	Emma	
2020	Dracula the Messiah	Mrs. Westenra	

Television roles
Year	Show	Role	Notes
1979–1982	Grange Hill	Penny Lewis	Regular cast; credited as Ruth Davies
1987	Lizzie's Pictures	Sylvie	2 episodes
1990	A Sense of Guilt	Sally Hinde	
1990	Screenplay	Laura	
1993	Screen Two		Series regular
1993	Shattered Family	Mitch	
