= James Wynn (actor) =

British actor, author and film-maker

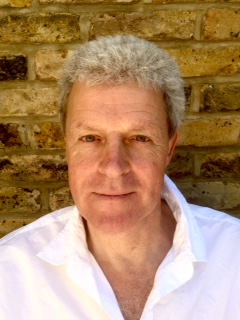
- Occupation: Actor
- Years active: 1974–present

James Wynn is a British actor, author and film-maker who currently works for HTB Church in London. He is best known for his role as Mr 'Sooty' Sutcliffe in the British children's TV drama Grange Hill. After leaving the programme in 1983 he gained a place on the BBC film directing course, and he went on to work on Comic Relief, Jim'll Fix It and Songs of Praise. His film career included roles in The Monster Club (1981, as a schoolteacher), Forever Young (1983) and Give My Regards To Broad Street (1984). In 2009 he wrote the non-fiction book The House That Jack Built, based on his life whilst living in the oldest occupied home in Britain, Saltford Manor House near Bath.

== TV ==
Year	Show	Role	Notes
1979-1982	Grange Hill	Mr Sutcliffe	
