= Tucker Jenkins =

Fictional character from the children's drama Grange Hill

Peter 'Tucker' Jenkins
- Grange Hill character
- Portrayed by: Todd Carty
- Duration: 1978–1982, 2003, 2008
- First appearance: 8 February 1978
- Last appearance: 15 September 2008
- Created by: Phil Redmond
- Spin-off appearances: Tucker's Luck (1983–1985)
In-universe information
- Occupation: Pupil (1978–1982); Builder
- Father: Mr Jenkins
- Mother: Ruth Jenkins
- Brothers: Barry Jenkins
- Sisters: Rhona Jenkins
- Nephews: Patrick "Togger" Johnson; Timothy 'Tigger' Johnson
- Nieces: Lucy Johnson

Peter "Tucker" Jenkins is a main character of British children's drama series Grange Hill, who appeared as a main cast member in the first four series. He would later guest appear in the show throughout its thirty-series run and would feature in his own spin-off Tucker's Luck. Tucker was played by Todd Carty in all his appearances. The show followed his progression from an unruly child to a rebellious teenager to a young man on the dole.

== Series history ==
=== Series 1 ===
Tucker Jenkins was placed in Mr Mitchell's form class in his first year where he quickly made friends with Benny Green, a poor student with the same sense of mischief and humour as Tucker. After being embarrassed by Foster, a strict PE teacher, and witnessing Benny being disregarded for the football team because he couldn't afford the kit, Tucker made it his mission to help Benny get a makeshift kit together. The same day, Tucker met Justin Bennett, a quiet, posh boy who seemed unimpressed by the comprehensive school. Justin's complaints and inability to joke around with Tucker's sense of humour caused the pair to become rivals. This was particularly evident when Tucker proceeded to push Justin into the school swimming pool during a swimming lesson and then steal his trousers, hanging them out of the window for all to see. Justin's revenge consisted of telling a teacher when Tucker, Benny, Alan and Tommy played in the pool without teacher supervision. Receiving a banishment from swimming lessons and detention, Benny then stole Tucker's trousers and hung them from the form window in a similar fashion.

Tucker and Benny would later explore an old deserted warehouse alongside Justin, though their own rivalry to outdo the other in dangerous stunts would cause Justin to fall from the building and cause him severe harm. Hearing of this from Justin's father, Tucker and Benny would receive the first corporal punishment Grange Hill had ever enacted. Tucker attempted to boast he could probably take much more than Benny could, but was quickly quieted as Benny snapped that was 'how they got into this mess'. Tucker would later run for school council, but lost out on votes due to his boisterous behaviour with other members of the class and being the only one to ever receive corporal punishment. Ann Wilson was elected instead much to Tucker's dismay. Sometime later, Tucker witnesses new boy Michael Doyle stealing an antique pistol but is unable to tell Mr Mitchell for fear Doyle's word would be taken over his, due to Doyle's father being on the council. Tucker instead decides to bully Doyle to giving the gun back. The technique worked and Doyle returned the gun. However, angered by Tucker, Doyle begins racially assaulting Benny Green as revenge for Tucker's own violence. Tucker attempts to help Benny several times, and jumps to his defence when he witnesses it but is unable to protect Benny, especially since Doyle targets the boy when Tucker is not around. This causes Benny to bunk off school, much to Tucker's confusion. Benny would eventually report the bullying to Mr Mitchell.

=== Series 2 ===
During his second term at Grange Hill, a new head teacher was installed. A majority of the first few episodes only featured Tucker as a supporting cast member, to set up for the new ensemble casting featuring more hard hitting storylines than simply Tucker's mischievous tricks. Tucker's first storyline coincides with character Simon Shaw's own dyslexia piece when he, Simon and their group of friends accidentally set fire to the school's auditorium after breaking in one night. Shaw is the only one of the boys caught. Despite avoiding punishment, Tucker volunteers to fix the damage the fire caused to the students work on the school play.

Although the running arc throughout this series was the abolition of school uniform, Tucker showed little to no interest in it. Instead, he focused on the abolition of a separate table for the poorer children who were forced to sit segregated from the others in the lunch hall, due to them getting free dinners. One particular lunch time, Benny was given a hard time by classroom bully Michael Doyle. Tucker and Doyle fought but were quickly split up. Angered and supported by School Uniform Abolition head Jess, Tucker joined in a protest to allow for all students to sit wherever they wanted in the lunch hall. The new head teacher praised Tucker's honesty and approach and removed the necessity for separate seating.

=== Series 3 ===
By the time Series 3 takes place, Tucker has become a third year. Although Tucker does not have an ongoing storyline himself, he does make cameos throughout. Near the end of the series, Tucker begins work experience at a building site owned by his best friend Alan Humphries' father. Here, he, Alan and Benny discover a fellow employee has been stealing and selling the stock to a scrapyard. Roping Mr Humphries into their investigation, the rogue employee is eventually caught and Tucker, along with his friends, are rewarded. Tucker also joins the rest of the third years to help build an outdoor centre where Cathy injures her foot. The accident causes the school to discard the outdoor centre, much to the students dismay.

The next week, Tucker and his friends are seen at their usual hang out spot at the shopping precinct where they see a classmate Antoni Karamanopolis hanging around with older years. After being intimidated out of the area, the gangs decide it is all out war. The shopping precinct is quickly banned by the school. Of course, Tucker, Antoni and the others disregard such a rule and sneak out to hang around there anyway. Tucker is seen by Baxter and quickly escapes. The next thing he hears is that Antoni was killed during a dare match gone too far. Antoni's gang deny Tucker's involvement in sneaking out, leaving Tucker in shock.

=== Series 4 ===
Tucker returns as part of the main cast for this series. Over the course of Christmas, the school has gone to ruins through vandalism. New headteacher Mrs McClusky decides to crack down on student behaviour. Tucker begins to be victimised by fifth year psychopath Booga Benson. He also agrees to enter a competition to design the new school magazine cover. Later, Tucker catches a first year writing some graffiti but is unfairly regarded as the culprit by the new caretaker. Tucker is then grabbed by the caretaker and pushes him in retaliation, something that causes him to get even deeper in trouble.

As the bullying by Booga Benson continues, Tucker believes he is the one vandalising the school. After Booga tears up his school magazine entry, Tucker bunks off the rest of the day to recreate it. He is caught running back into the school by PE Teacher Mr Baxter and is told by Mr Sutcliffe to report to Baxter's office. He does so, only to find Booga destroying the office. Booga threatens Tucker not to report him but after it is reported that the school dance would not go forward unless the culprit is caught, Tucker reports the incident. He is later savagely beaten by Booga at the school dance and left for dead. Fortunately, he survived and Booga was arrested.

After a lengthy stay at home, Tucker finally rejoins Grange Hill in time for the school trip to France. Unfortunately, he attempts to sneak his friend Tommy on the trip which causes the school to be sent home. Around this time, Tucker began to develop feelings for classmate Pamela Cartwright. He attempts to ask her out several times throughout the series but it is eventually climaxed with him overhearing from Pamela that she would never date him. After missing the bus home from school, Tucker also managed to save a first year student from a paedophile. Tucker decides he does not want to go to University despite his mother's insistence.

At Christmas that year, a now fourth year Tucker helps DJ at the school Christmas disco using his brother's DJ set. An attempt by Brookdale kids to break the stereo ends the disco in a large fight, one in which Tucker's nemesis Doyle defends him. The two thank each other and agree that their teamwork was only due to the Christmas holiday.

=== Guest appearances ===
For the show's fifth series, a new cast was brought in and so Tucker's character is officially retired. However, Todd Carty guest appears in several series after due to his high popularity. In the fifth series, he was present in the first episode saving the new cast from the bully Gripper Stebson. Tucker also returns with the original cast in the episode "School Revue", where he single-handedly saves the talent showcase, by buying a champagne bottle for the showcase's raffle, much to teacher Mr McGuffey's ire (though as a result of this purchase, the raffle turns out to be an enormous success), and performs a song in praise of the latter with his band as part of the show.

Tucker would then be absent from the show until 2003, where he would drop off his nephew Togger Johnson at Grange Hill. He returned one final time for the show's last episode in 2008, when telling his nephew not to make the same mistake as he did and leave school early, which led Togger to staying on. His speech consisted of the importance of comprehensive schools, which were a leading effort to improve equality in class divisions in Britain. His last scene was riding off on his motorbike.

== Other appearances ==
On 20 April 2009, Tucker was an unseen character in episode 2.1 of Ashes to Ashes. In that episode, the protagonist, DI Alex Drake, sees her daughter Molly incorporated into an episode of Grange Hill on the evening of 3 or 5 April 1982 [calendar indicates 3 April; the news report was from 5 April]. Molly (in new footage) tells headmistress Bridget McClusky (appearing as archival footage and Gwyneth Powell's newly recorded audio) that she and Tucker got into a fight when Tucker said her mother Alex was dead.

== Spin-offs ==
=== Tucker's Luck ===
Tucker appeared in three series of Tucker's Luck, which showed Tucker and his friends Alan and Tommy after they left Grange Hill and their struggles with growing up and trying to find work.

=== Tucker's Return ===
In 1989, Carty reprised the role of Tucker Jenkins in a musical play titled Tucker's Return. It was staged at Queen's Theatre, Hornchurch and followed Tucker, now returned to Grange Hill as a PE teacher.

== Casting ==
Carty attended a Saturday morning acting class at Phildene Stage School from the age of four, which had an attached agency. Carty was put forward for the role of Tucker by his agency and was against about 500 other children. Carty stated that he was spotted by the producer jumping the queue, which happened in episode three of the first series by Tucker, "so there must have been something in what I [Carty] did, as well as how I [Carty] read for the part, that eventually saw me in the role of Tucker."

== See also ==
- Togger Johnson
