= Lindy Brill =

British former actress

Lyndy Brill (also known as Lindy Brill; born 30 July 1963) is a British former actress and singer. She was a pupil at the Barbara Speake Stage School. She is best known for playing Cathy Hargreaves in the BBC school drama Grange Hill (1979–82), and also made brief appearances in episodes of The Sweeney (Nightmare) in 1978 and Minder (A Tethered Goat) in 1979.

She also appeared on Top of the Pops in 1978 as one of the St Winifred's School Choir backing singers on Brian and Michael's number 1 hit "Matchstalk Men and Matchstalk Cats and Dogs".

Brill continued to act after leaving Grange Hill, appearing in the West End and in the BBC miniseries Alexa and Claire in 1982, but she decided to end her acting career when she turned 30. She then worked in sales support for an educational book publisher.

== Personal life ==
Brill lives in Oxford with her boyfriend and son, born in 2003.
