= Terry Sue-Patt =

British actor (1964–2015)

- Sue-Patt as Benny Green in Grange Hill
- Born: 19 September 1964; Islington, London, England
- Died: May 2015 (aged 50); Walthamstow, London, England
- Occupations: Actor and artist
- Years active: 1973–2015

Terence Anthony Sue-Patt (19 September 1964 – circa May 2015) was a British actor, best known for playing Benny Green in the BBC series Grange Hill (1978–1982).

== Early life ==
Sue-Patt was born in Islington, London, one of the six children of Alston, of Chinese and Jamaican descent, and May (née Stewart) Sue-Patt, of Jamaican and Scottish descent. He attended Sir William Collins Comprehensive School, and the Anna Scher Theatre School. Scher had been Sue-Patt's English teacher while he was at Ecclesbourne junior school before she opened her drama school.

== Career ==
Sue-Patt began his acting career with small parts in various Children's Film Foundation productions including Blind Man's Bluff (1977), a part in the 1973 public information film Lonely Water, and an appearance in General Hospital for ATV. He was given the part of Benny Green in Grange Hill after being spotted at his local drama group and playing football in the local park by Colin Cant, the series' original director. His character was the first pupil seen on screen in the first episode. "I basically played myself in Grange Hill", he later recalled. "There weren't many black actors about on TV at that time. I had a great time, getting time off school to play football. It was a bit of a dream come true, really."

After leaving Grange Hill, he turned down a reprisal of his role in the spin-off series Tucker's Luck, having had enough of playing Benny and wanting to broaden his acting horizons.

Sue-Patt played the role of Yusef in Alan Clarke's The Firm (1989). He also played a gunman in the Channel 4 series Desmond's in 1990 (which featured an in-joke about his role in Grange Hill), and he appeared in the BBC Schools programme, Scene (1990s).

== Death ==
Sue-Patt's death was announced on Twitter and on his Facebook profile on 22 May 2015. Scotland Yard confirmed that officers had forced entry into a flat in Walthamstow after concerns were raised about the welfare of the occupant; however, the death was not treated as suspicious. It was reported that Sue-Patt may have died up to a month before his body was discovered.
