= Robert Hartley =

British actor (1915–1998)

Robert Hartley (1915–1998) was a British stage, film and television actor.

== Selected filmography ==
Film

- At the Stroke of Nine (1957)
- Bread (1971)

Television

- Z-Cars (1962–1974)
- The Avengers (1963)
- David Copperfield (1966)
- The Six Wives of Henry VIII (1970, played Bishop Fox, episode 'Catherine of Aragon')
- The Rivals of Sherlock Holmes (1971–73)
- New Scotland Yard (1972)
- The Onedin Line (1972)
- Lillie (1979)
- Crown Court (1973, played defendant Dominic Collins in episode 'Infanticide or Murder')
- Prince Regent (1979)
- A Kind of Loving (1982)
- Grange Hill (1979–1983)
- The Charmer (1987)
- Upstairs, Downstairs (played a coroner in an episode called 'Joke Over')
