= Todd Carty =

British actor (born 1963)

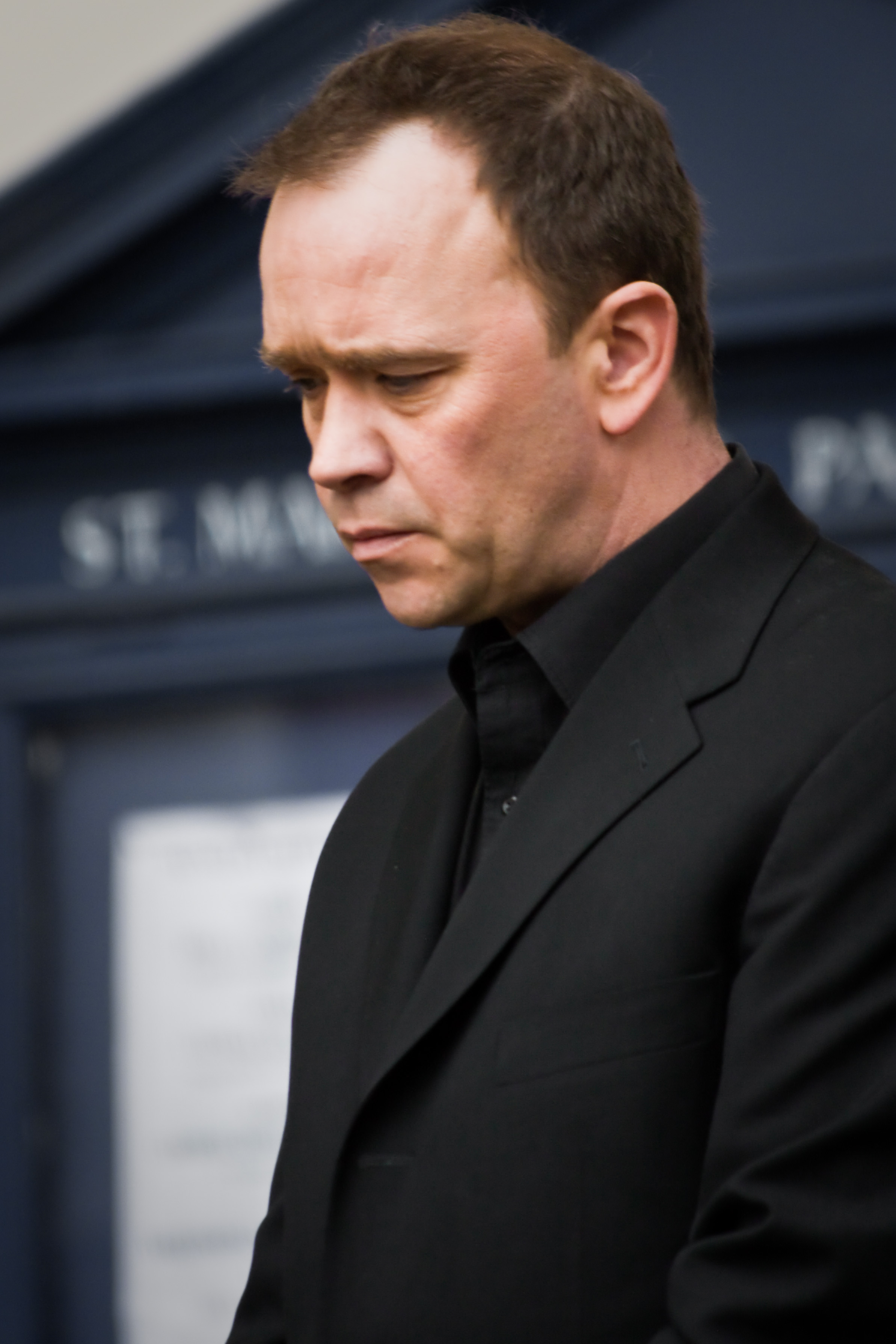
- Carty in 2009 at Wendy Richard's funeral service
- Born: Todd Robert Carty; 31 August 1963 (age 62); Willesden, London, England
- Occupation: Actor
- Years active: 1967–present
- Height: 1.78 m (5 ft 10 in)
- Partner: Dina Clarkin
- Children: 2

Todd Carty, also known as Todd John Jennings (born Todd Robert Carty; 31 August 1963), is an English actor and director who has grown up on television screens in a variety of roles. His stage appearances have ranged from serious drama to pantomime, and he has worked on radio plays, voiceovers, commercials, and films. He is best known for TV roles as Tucker Jenkins in Grange Hill (1978–1982) and Tucker's Luck (1983–1985), Mark Fowler in EastEnders (1990–2003), and PC Gabriel Kent in The Bill (2003–2005).

== Early life ==
Todd Robert Carty was born in Willesden, London, to an unmarried Irish mother, Margaret Carty, from Limerick. In 1972, Margaret married Thomas Jennings, who later adopted Carty and legally changed his name to Todd John Jennings. Through his mother, Carty is a dual citizen of the United Kingdom and Republic of Ireland. He grew up in Kilburn, West Hampstead and Harrow on the Hill, all in London. He has two younger sisters named Billie Joe and Bobby Sue, who respectively work as a lawyer and a teacher. Carty was educated at the Phildene Stage School, a co-educational independent school in Chiswick in west London.

== Career ==
=== Early career ===
Carty's first television appearance in the UK was in an advertisement for Woolworths, aged four. He also had other advertising and Public Information Film roles, including one with Doctor Who actor Jon Pertwee for the Green Cross Code.

Carty made his first professional stage appearance at the New London Theatre, Drury Lane, London, as the young Lionel in Lionel Bart's autobiographical musical Lionel!. However, his career in his youth was mostly defined by his television role as Tucker Jenkins in the BBC children's drama Grange Hill (1978–1982) and the spin-off series Tucker's Luck (1983–1985).

During the 1970s and 1980s, Carty also appeared in Z-Cars (1976), Our Mutual Friend, Drummer, and Headmaster, all for the BBC; and, for German TV, Focus on Britain and The Idle Bunch. His film work included Please Sir! (1971) and Professor Popper's Problem (1974). In 1983, he landed the role of Oswyn in the fantasy film Krull opposite Kenneth Marshall, Lysette Anthony, Liam Neeson and Alun Armstrong, among others.

=== EastEnders and The Bill ===
Carty took over the role of original character Mark Fowler in the BBC One soap opera EastEnders in 1990, following the suicide of the original actor, David Scarboro. Carty played the role for 13 years, becoming one of the longer-running male cast members. In July 2002, the BBC announced Mark Fowler was being written out of the serial, a mutual decision between the producers and Carty. Executive producer Louise Berridge said Carty had made a "fantastic contribution" to the soap and Mark had been a "pivotal figure", but the character had finally run its course: "Todd and I have discussed this at some length and agreed that it was time for Mark to hang up his leather jacket for the last time. We will all miss Todd, who is one of our best-loved actors, and wish him every success in the future." Carty made his final appearance as Mark in February 2003, riding out of the Square on his motorbike and falling off. The character subsequently died off-screen in 2004.

After leaving EastEnders in 2003, Carty went on to play the villainous PC Gabriel Kent, in ITV's The Bill from 2003 to 2005. Carty has since revealed he broke his EastEnders contract a year earlier than planned to take on this new role.

In 2019, Carty shared his memories of playing Gabriel in an interview for The Bill Podcast.

=== Other television and film appearances ===
Carty starred as Randy Candy in the film The Candy Show (1989). While still in EastEnders in 1997, Carty appeared with former EastEnders co-star Nick Berry in the Victorian period adventure film The Black Velvet Band, a Spaghetti Western–style drama.

Carty was the subject of a This Is Your Life tribute in 2000. Guests included Wendy Richard, Norman Wisdom, Nick Berry, his girlfriend Dina Clarkin, sons James Carty and Thomas Carty, and his father-in-law, actor Tony Clarkin.

After leaving The Bill in 2005, Carty returned to the big screen as the aristocrat Harvey Van Bollingbroke in the film Treasure of Albion (2006). Carty acted in The School that Roared (2009) as the eccentric Mr Haig, and was also the second-unit director. He appeared as Mr Keller in the 2010 film Blame.

Carty has guest-starred as Ray Hallam in the Christmas special of the TV series Heartbeat, and in BBC's Holby City, as villain Cameron Cooke. In 2008, he guest-starred in BBC's Doctors, playing the part of Kev Blake.

In 2003, Carty reprised the role of Tucker Jenkins in Grange Hill, as the uncle of one of the pupils, Patrick "Togger" Johnson. He appeared in just this one episode, but he was brought back once again to film for Grange Hill's final series, broadcast in 2008 – a one-off special episode to celebrate the 30th birthday of the long-running BBC show. Carty appeared as Tucker in the final televised episode of Grange Hill, screened on Monday 15 September 2008 on BBC One.

Carty was a guest on the BBC One show I'd Do Anything, in May 2008, with Cameron Mackintosh, helping to choose one of the selected boys to play Oliver Twist for the new West End production of Oliver!.

Carty and his elder son, James, filmed together in a factual television series for Channel 5, Dangerous Adventures For Boys, based on the book written by Conn and Hal Iggulden, The Dangerous Book for Boys. James Carty, aged 11 at the time of broadcast, became the youngest person to drive a steam train across the North York Moors 18-mile line from Grosmont, North Yorkshire to Pickering, built in the 1830s.

In June 2014, Carty was a contestant on Celebrity MasterChef.

Carty appeared as Mike in the film Silver Birches in 2017.

=== Dancing on Ice ===
Carty appeared in the fourth series of the UK version of Dancing on Ice, which began on 11 January 2009. Carty partnered professional skater Susie Lipanova and was heavily criticised by the judging panel for his apparent lack of skating ability. In the weeks he and Lipanova competed, they finished bottom of the leaderboard for their first week, 9.5 for their next appearance in week three, and 7.5 and 8.5 for weeks four and five respectively. During the routine in week three, with Carty and Lipanova dancing to the Beatles song "Help", Carty lost control on the ice so badly that he stumbled into the off-stage area, disappearing from public view, leaving Lipanova to continue dancing alone; he returned just in time to complete the routine. The public vote carried the couple through to the next round, and Carty's crash was described as one of the funniest moments ever captured on television. He was finally eliminated in the fifth round.

He also competed with Alexandra Schauman in the ninth and final series of Dancing on Ice until it returned in 2018, which was an "All-Stars" series.

=== Radio, presenting and stage ===
Carty's radio work includes such dramas as Les Misérables, The Three Loves of Ida Bliss, We Are Happy, Wavelength, Midweek, Jellybones, The London Particulars, Bringing Eddie Home, and The Chocolate Frigate. Narration work includes Paddington Green, the story of the New York City Subway's Guardian Angels' Scene in New York, The Fame Game, Driving Mum Crazy, Snapshot-Eddie Kidd, The Jungle Creatures, and many more. In 1989, Carty reprised the role of Tucker in the musical stage version of the television series Grange Hill: Grange Hill: Tucker's Return, at the Queen's Theatre, Hornchurch. Between 2007 and 2008, he toured the UK in The Business of Murder as Police Detective Hallett. Todd Carty and Wendy Richard (who played his screen mother Pauline in EastEnders) presented 50 Greatest Families on Sky One in March 2008.

Carty also appeared in a BBC Radio 4 Play of the day "Bringing Eddie Home" by John Peacock, based on a true story of the fight by East End couple Edna and Jack Wallace to get their son's body brought home from Aden, and the ensuing fight for the rights of British Service service personnel. Carty played the role of the younger Jack Wallace and the play also included other ex-EastEnders actors Bill Treacher, Tilly Vosburgh, Edna Doré and Joe Absolom

Carty starred as Patsy, from May 2010, to 2015, in the Monty Python touring production of Spamalot.

==== Pantomimes ====
Carty has played Ali Baba in the BBC Christmas pantomime Aladdin, and starred as Buttons in Cinderella at the Gatehouse Theatre Stafford from 14 December 1993 to 2 January 1994. He later starred with Barbara Windsor as the captain's mate in Dick Whittington at the Orchard Theatre, Dartford.

He appeared as "King Rat" with Basil Brush in the pantomime Dick Whittington at the Wycombe Swan Theatre between 2005 and 2006. He reprised the role of King Rat in a new version of Dick Whittington, at the Capitol Theatre, Horsham, which ran from 13 December 2007 to 6 January 2008. In December 2008, Carty starred as the evil Ferdinand Fleshcreep (The Giant's Evil Assistant) in Jack and the Beanstalk at the Queen's Theatre in Barnstaple. The show ran from 12 December 2008 to 4 January 2009. Carty starred as Buttons in Cinderella at the Pavilion Theatre Worthing from 10 December 2009 to 3 January 2010. In December 2014, he appeared in the Chatham Theatre pantomime production of Aladdin, (with Twist and Pulse, produced by Jordan Productions).

Carty again played Flashcreep in Jack and the Beanstalk, in a production at the Newark Palace Theatre in Newark-on-Trent (7 – 31 December 2016).

Played Captain Hook in Peter Pan at Watersmeet theatre in Rickmansworth from December 2019 to January 2020.

Carty played the role of Maurice, Belle’s father in the pantomime production of ‘Beauty and the Beast’ at the Deco Theatre, The Old Savoy, Northampton in December 2025.

=== Directing and producing ===
Carty and his partner, actress/writer and film producer Dina Clarkin, have set up a film production company, Swordfish Productions. In July 2007 Carty made his debut as director of several episodes of the BBC's daytime soap opera, Doctors. Carty directed his first feature film, The Perfect Burger (2010), made with the Co-operative British Youth Film Academy, set in the Leicestershire town of Hinckley. The film was mainly shot at the Hinckley campus of North Warwickshire and Hinckley College.

== Personal life ==
Carty lives in Muswell Hill, north London. He has been in a relationship since 1990 with his business partner, actress/writer and film producer Dina Clarkin – the daughter of Irish actor Tony Clarkin. The couple have known each other since childhood through their parents, and have two sons, James and Thomas. In an interview with the Daily Mirror, Carty explained how he first met Clarkin when she was a 5-year-old child actress and he a 14-year-old, through their parents. Carty describes Dina as his soul mate.

== Filmography ==
Year	Show	Role	Notes
1971	Please Sir!	Boy in assembly wishing to be excused	Uncredited
1974	Professor Popper's Problem	Angus	
1976	Z-Cars	Billy	1 episode: Ringers
1977	Headmaster		1 episode: The Public Image
1978–1982	Grange Hill	Peter "Tucker" Jenkins	50 episodes
1983	Krull	Oswyn	
1983–1985	Tucker's Luck	Peter "Tucker" Jenkins	27 episodes
1989	The Candy Show	Randy Candy	
1990–2003	EastEnders	Mark Fowler	1,235 episodes
1993	GamesMaster	Himself	Special Guest
1997	Black Velvet Band	Pentecost	
2003	Grange Hill	Peter "Tucker" Jenkins	1 episode
2003–2005	The Bill	PC Gabriel Kent	118 episodes
2005	Heartbeat	Ray Hallam	1 episode: Auld Acquaintance
2006	Holby City	Cameron Cooke	1 episode: Games of Chance
2006	Treasure of Albion	Harvey Van Bolingbroke	
2007–2009	Doctors	Kev Blake	1 episode: Stand Up and Be Counted
2008	Doctors		Director of 6 episodes
2008	Grange Hill	Peter "Tucker" Jenkins	1 episode: Bang
2009	The School that Roared	Mr Haig	
2009, 2014	Dancing on Ice	Himself, competitor	Series 4 & Series 9
2010	Blame	My Keller	
2010	The Perfect Burger		Director
2013	A Touch of Cloth	Himself	
2017	Amoc	Tony	
2018	Celebrity 5 Go Caravanning	Himself	Left after 2 episodes
2019	Birches	Mike	
2019	The Drive	Dan	Short film
