= George Armstrong (actor) =

British actor (1962–2023)

- Born: 7 September 1962
- Died: 11 July 2023 (aged 60); London, England
- Occupation: Actor
- Years active: 1973–1989

George Andrew Clark Armstrong (7 September 1962 – 11 July 2023) was an English actor.

His first role was as Hubert Lane in Just William (alongside Bonnie Langford as Violet Elizabeth Bott) in 1977. He was best known for the part of Alan Humphries in the BBC series Grange Hill, a part he played between 1978 and 1982, and again in 1983 in the spin-off series Tucker's Luck. His last role was as PC Driscoll in The Bill in 1989.

After giving up acting, he became a technical theatre manager at a public school.

Armstrong died in London on 11 July 2023, after a long battle with leukaemia. He was 60.
