= Grange Hill series 10 =

Grange Hill
- Season 10
- No. of episodes: 24

Release
- Original network: BBC One
- Original release: 6 January – 27 March 1987

Season chronology
- ← Previous; Series 9 Next → Series 11

The tenth series of the British television drama series Grange Hill began broadcasting on 6 January 1987, before ending on 27 March 1987 on BBC One. The series follows the lives of the staff and Students of the eponymous school, an inner-city London comprehensive school. It consists of twenty-four episodes.

== Cast and characters ==
=== Students ===
- Lee MacDonald as Zammo McGuire
- Erkan Mustafa as Roland Browning
- Alison Bettles as Fay Lucas
- Lisa York as Julie Marchant
- Melissa Wilks as Jackie Wright
- Tim Polley as Banksy Banks
- Amma Asante as Cheryl Webb
- Jonathan Lambeth as Danny Kendall
- Fiona Lee-Fraser as Laura Reagan-from episode 10
- Alison McLaughlin as Louise Webb
- Sara McGlasson as Julia Glover
- Ricky Simmonds as Ant Jones
- Simon Vaughan as Freddie Mainwaring
- Simone Hyams as Calley Donnington
- John Drummond as Trevor Cleaver
- Tina Mahon as Ronnie Birtles
- John Alford as Robbie Wright
- John Holmes as Gonch Gardner-from episode 10
- Steve West as Vince Savage
- Ruth Carraway as Helen Kelly
- Joann Kenny as Jane Bishop
- Bradley Sheppard as Hollo Holloway
- Fleur Taylor as Imelda Davis
- Samantha Lewis as Georgina Hayes

=== Teachers ===
- Gwyneth Powell as Mrs Bridget McClusky
- Nicholas Donnelly as Mr Craig McKenzie
- George A. Cooper as Mr Eric Griffiths
- Karen Ford as Miss Ginny Booth
- Michael Sheard as Mr Maurice Bronson
- Lucinda Curtis as Mrs Liz Reagan
- Jeffery Kissoon as Mr Chris Kennedy
- Karen Lewis as Miss Roz Partridge
- David Straun as Mr Peter King-guest appearance episode 20
- Aran Bell as Mr Phil Scott

== Episodes ==
No.	Episode	Writer	Director	Original airdate
1	Episode One	Barry Purchese	Edward Pugh	6 January 1987
Mr Baxter has left Grange Hill to run a sports centre and Mr Bronson is the new deputy whilst Miss Partridge is head of studies. The Students also have new uniforms with the badge designed by Danny Kendall. Roland now has contact lenses and the new Sixth Form building has a few problems, including the size of the toilets. Imelda comes to school with hair dye and a hit list and Hollo is her first victim. Imelda then destroys the new notice board with hair dye. Mr Scott is E3's new form tutor. Fay and Zammo are re-sitting their O-Levels, but Fay is shocked to find out she and Zammo will be with the 5th Years. Ziggy and Helen argue after Ziggy learns Helen is a Liverpool fan and Mr Griffiths catches them. Helen and Ziggy then overhear Mr Griffiths talking to Mrs McClusky and Mr Bronson about Harriet the donkey. Mrs McClusky tells Mr Griffiths about the stables Harriet is staying at is closing down and Ziggy suggests Harriet stays at the school. Imelda and Trevor call a truce and he leaves Vince with Imelda. First Appearance: Mr Scott
2	Episode Two	Barry Purchese	Edward Pugh	9 January 1987
Both Mrs McClusky and Mr Griffiths are anxious about what will happen to Harriet. Mr Griffiths promises he will sort it out. Banksie is being blamed for the mess in the Sixth Form common room and he storms out. Imelda has now teamed up with Trevor, and together the pair of them misbehave in Mr Scott's lesson. Meanwhile, Mr Griffiths is measuring the shed and buying timber. Jane, Calley and Ronnie start speaking in a secret language and Ziggy sticks a "Divy" sticker on Imelda's forehead, resulting in Trevor having his tie ruined. Trevor later tricks Vince into giving him his tie, but he isn't going to return it. Helen is avoiding Imelda and Ziggy borrows a pound from Mr Scott. Miss Booth wants Danny to be involved in a new project – painting the community centre wall. At first, he appears excited to work with her, but then lets her down by refusing to work with her. Danny tells Miss Booth that he had a twin brother, who died. Later, Danny has a blackout when Helen and Ziggy turn up. Mr Griffiths catches Helen and Ziggy truanting and takes them to the donkey sanctuary. Ziggy figures out that Harriet is going to be living on the school grounds.
3	Episode Three	David Angus	Edward Pugh	13 January 1987
Roland expresses concern to Mr McClusky about the state of the common room. Imelda causes trouble by cutting Vince's tie. Danny Kendall proposes a Grange Hill radio station. Ziggy and Rob make arrangements for Harriet's upkeep. Mr Bronson issues a new staff rulebook with requirements that include student's carrying work diaries and teacher's maintaining a report card for every Student.
4	Episode Four	David Angus	Edward Pugh	16 January 1987
Ziggy gets £1 from Vince in return for the promise of getting him a new tie to replace the tie Imelda cut. Vince gets a new tie. Then Imelda's tie goes missing after she took it off in a Woodwork lesson. Mrs McClusky discusses Danny Kendall's idea for a radio station the staff room. Ant Jones can't keep away from Grange Hill. Harriet gets a new home in the Grange Hill shed – without Mrs McClusky's knowledge.
5	Episode Five	David Angus	Margie Barbour	20 January 1987
Imelda brings in a portable radio. Danny Kendall gets into trouble with Mr Bronson for skipping lessons. Danny gets put on a report. There is a meeting about the Sixth Form Barge trip. Danny Kendall plans his radio station with permission. Imelda finds her lost tie in Mr Scott's desk draw. Roly tells Mr Griffiths that some of the Sixth Formers know about Harriet. Roly suggests if he finds the Sixth Formers a new common room they will keep quiet. Zammo and Fay aren't happy that they aren't in the same classes as their former year as they have been put back a year.
6	Episode Six	David Angus	Margie Barbour	23 January 1987
The Sixth Formers get a new common room. The teachers think Danny Kendall is on drugs. Imelda continues to cause trouble by smashing equipment in the science laboratory. Mrs McClusky finds out about Harriet and allows her to stay.
7	Episode Seven	Rosemary Mason	Margie Barbour	27 January 1987
Banksie wants Jackie to dump Zammo to go out with him, but she refuses. Danny throws his School Report in the pond. There is going to be Grange Hill Bottle day to raise money for the School Fund. Paul and Vince have other ideas on what to do with empty bottles. Danny gets in trouble with Mr Bronson for throwing his School Report in the bin. Roly finds out that Danny is severely ill with a tumour and will need to go to hospital in Aberdeen. Vince and Paul take the bottles for their own benefit. Mr Kendall tells Mrs McClusky in a meeting that Danny is indeed on drugs – prescription drugs. It was decided that the radio station would try to be set up before Danny leaves for hospital. The dinner lady refuses to serve Imelda chips. Ziggy and Rob get the wrong cable for the radio station. Harriet dents cars in the car park.
8	Episode Eight	Rosemary Mason	Margie Barbour	30 January 1987
Mr Griffiths finds a lot of bottles outside the school entrance. Vince and Paul decide to change their minds on what to do with their bottles. Ant Jones continues to visit Grange Hill. Imelda continues to disrupt classes. Roly starts up a Danny Kendall Fund to pay for the cost of Danny's operation. The radio station room takes shape. Vince and Paul think the whole school's proceeds of the glass bottles should go to the Danny Kendall Fund. Danny gets rushed to hospital after collapsing.
9	Episode Nine	Margaret Simpson	Albert Barber	3 February 1987
Mr Bronson takes charge of a plan to use the Grange Hill radio station to raise money for Mrs Kendall to accompany Danny to hospital in Aberdeen. He is going to hold a meeting at lunchtime. However, the Sixth Formers plan their own meeting. Imelda causes fighting in Mr Scott's classroom so gets to sit outside Mr Kennedy's office for the day. The turnout for Mr Bronson's meeting is disappointing. At Roly's meeting, Ziggy decides to climb the school building. Jackie wants to go on the Barge trip but Zammo doesn't want to go. But Jackie doesn't want to go if Banksie is going to be there. Paul finds out that Gonch has been going out with Ronny. Helen finds out from George in Harriet's stable that Ant hasn't been going into St Joseph's often as he says the other Students are snobbish. Ziggy no longer wants to look after Harriet. Imelda comes in Harriet's stable looking for Ziggy and takes his biscuit tin full of money for the Danny Kendall Fund for herself.
10	Episode Ten	Margaret Simpson	David Bell	6 February 1987
Gonch and Laura return to Grange Hill. Zammo is not happy that Banksie and Jackie are going on the Barge trip together. Bridget agrees to do an interview for the radio station. Ziggy is not happy that Imelda has taken his tin of money (£12) for Danny. Imelda as usual causes havoc in Mr Scott's classroom. Mrs Davis goes to a meeting with Mrs McClusky and Imelda gets expelled. Gonch gets a place on the canal trip after Jackie pulls out to go to Zammo's Narcotics Anonymous meeting. Final appearance: Imelda Davis
11	Episode Eleven	Barry Purchese	John Smith	10 February 1987
It is the start of the Canal trip. Freddie gets in trouble with Mr Kennedy for putting his clothes in one of only two toilets on the boys' boat. Ziggy and Rob try cooking on the boat. Freddie and Julie try to go for a walk on their own. Mrs Regan is not happy so Georgina, Banksie and Laura end up going as well. George suggests Julie should contact Freddie after everyone's asleep – but they don't have a Morse Code machine. Ant Jones ends up coming on the trip in secret and is seen to by Vince. Gonch, Ziggy, Rob and Trevor end up having to set up an Army survival tent after crashing their boat on the side of the canal. The boat itself becomes unattached from the side of the canal – with Ant Jones on it.
12	Episode Twelve	Barry Purchese	John Smith	13 February 1987
Still on the canal trip, it emerges that Mr Scott was in a tent very close to the Gonch's, Ziggy's, Rob's and Trevor's army tent all along to keep an eye on them. Ant Jones is stuck on the boat in the middle of the canal, and when Mr Scott, Gonch, Ziggy, Rob and Trevor come back from their tents, they find it difficult to get on the boat. The Students decide to walk along the riverbank parallel to the boat. Ant Jones gets a close escape when Mr Kennedy nearly finds out that he is on the boat. Freddie ends up falling over. Ziggy and Rob decide to go birdwatching. Banksie and Laura decide to go for a walk with Freddie, Ant, Julie and George. Ziggy is still up a tree, bird watching, and Banksie and company notice him. Ziggy ends up injuring his finger coming down the tree. Mr Kennedy has to accompany Ziggy to casualty. Mr Scott ends up playing a guitar in the boat. Freddie gets hurt by a gas tap and is saved by Ant. Mrs Regan, Mr Scott and Mr Kennedy find out about Ant and have to send him home. The Students end up going to a disco on the final night.
13	Episode Thirteen	Margaret Simpson	David Bell	17 February 1987
Ziggy insists on climbing up the school to Rob to raise money for the Danny Kendall Fund. Freddie tries to interview Mrs McClusky for the launch of the Grange Hill radio station. Banksie ends up doing work in a Special Needs school. Ziggy and Rob try to paint a flag "Ziggy Greaves was here" in the Art Room but get found out and get in trouble for not asking permission. Freddie and Julie visit Danny's house to see how he is. They need him to record an introduction to the new radio station. Mrs McClusky is not happy at how her interview is going to be presented on the radio show. Cheryl cannot stay for the radio show so Laura does instead. Banksie drops Laura off at her house on his motorbike much to Mrs Regan's disgust. Ziggy and Rob redo their banner in the Art Room, and end up flooding it.
14	Episode Fourteen	Margaret Simpson	David Bell	20 February 1987
Zammo isn't happy that Jackie wants to wear her engagement ring to school. The Grange Hill radio station is launched with Danny's pre-recorded message. However, the sound system isn't connected up to the Sixth Form common room. Fay ends the week's show by announcing the engagement of Jackie and Zammo – only for it to emerge that neither of them had told their parents. In Harriet's stable, Rob says to Ziggy how unhappy he is that her sister is marrying Zammo the "pig". He is still surprised that Ziggy wants to climb up the school roof – who finds a secret way how to get up there. After school, crowds gather in the playground to watch Ziggy hoist his flag up. They chant the tune "Why are we waiting?". However, he never appears as he went up on the far side of the school. But when he came down and looked in front of the crowd, his flag had been taken down. The audience wanted a refund, as they did not believe he had accomplished his task. Then a furious Mr Bronson turns up with Ziggy's flag and sends him to his office.
15	Episode Fifteen	Sarah Daniels	David Bell	24 February 1987
Gonch ropes Hollo into his new scheme of using the donkey to make money. When Jackie wears her engagement ring to school she gets into trouble. Cleaver discovers Savage's den and trashes it causing Savage to start a fight in the dining hall. Banksie goes to a school for handicapped children to start his work experience. Whilst doing donkey rides around the park, Gonch and Hollo get chased by park keepers.
16	Episode Sixteen	Sarah Daniels	Albert Barber	27 February 1987
Whilst on work experience Banksie gets to know Lucy and Perry. They get him into trouble when they show him what life in a wheelchair is like. Harriet the donkey is unwell. Ziggy plays football for the Grange Hill team against St. Jo's where he is tackled and injured by Ant Jones. Gonch and Savage plan to deter Cleaver from coming back to their den.
17	Episode Seventeen	Chris Ellis	Albert Barber	3 March 1987
Ant tries to apologise to Ziggy for causing his injury during the football match. Harriet appears to be suffering food poisoning due to eating unsuitable plants. Mr Scott's class cause havoc, defying his attempts to put all latecomers in detention. Gonch convinces Cleaver that the den is haunted by a ghost. A meeting between students and teachers to discuss reports cards only leads to deeper resentment.
18	Episode Eighteen	Chris Ellis	Albert Barber	6 March 1987
The Sixth Formers get their exam results. Mr Scott tries to allow his class some responsibility in registration, but Cleaver abuses the opportunity, causing Mr Scott to lose his temper. Ant continues to feel on the outside of things as Grange Hill Students continue to ignore him for injuring Ziggy. Gonch, Hollo and Savage continue to scare Cleaver with their "ghost". Harriet is still unwell. Freddie reads directly from the staff handbook, causing Mr Bronson much annoyance. At another football match, Ant Jones' team from St. Jo's accuse him of playing for the advantage of his former Grange Hill friends.
19	Episode Nineteen	Margaret Simpson	Albert Barber	10 March 1987
Roland has agreed to lose weight for the Danny Kendall Fund. Gonch is taking bets, offering 100-1 if Roland loses more than 5 stone, which Cleaver places 20p on. Julia is made to spy on what goes on at the school by her father. Students begin to misinterpret the staff handbook by following directives literally. Gonch, Hollo and Robbie dress in skirts for cricket because it says to do so in the handbook, but Mr Bronson forces them to play outside in their chosen attire. Roland's diet is sabotaged when Gonch and Hollo discover he is losing weight with more success than they expected. In biology class, Mr Scott dissects a pig's heart, causing Cleaver to be sick. Steven Banks is determined to help out more at Hazelrigg. Mrs McCluskey decides that Harriet can no longer remain on the school premises and must go to a sanctuary.
20	Episode Twenty	Margaret Simpson	John Smith	13 March 1987
Miss Booth and Fay set up their stall at the Craft Fair, whilst Jackie goes shopping with Julie for wedding dress material. Banksie takes Lucy to the fair where they run into Laura who had refused to come with them earlier. Zammo goes shopping with his mother for his wedding suit. Cheryl warns Gonch that she is onto him for sabotaging Roland's diet. Mr King comes to the fair and when Fay finds out he has a new girlfriend she runs away upset. Harriet is taken to a donkey sanctuary in Essex by Mr Griffiths.
21	Episode Twenty-One	Barry Purchese	John Smith	17 March 1987
Mr Bronson issues a notice to all Students warning them against misinterpreting the rules, causing further animosity between Students and staff. Mrs McCluskey calls him to her office and warns him not to go behind her back again making school policy without her approval. Cleaver attempts to provoke Mr Scott again and is almost punched for his behaviour. Danny Kendall returns to Grange Hill but his dad's car nearly hits two St. Josephs boys on the way to school. Danny refuses to participate in a planned sit-in with Students to protest the staff handbook. Later, Danny catches Julia meeting Mr Bronson and figures out that she is spying on her friends for her father. Georgina is upset with Ant when he becomes involved in a fight started between the two St. Josephs boys and Danny. Several other Grange Hill boys join in and the St. Josephs boys run off, they promise to come back the next day with their friends to have another fight.
22	Episode Twenty-Two	Barry Purchese	John Smith	20 March 1987
The sit-in gets underway, with Danny exposing Julia for spying and arranging to feed false information to Mr Bronson and her father. By running the radio off a separate fuse in the Sixth Form common room, the protesters halt Mrs McCluskeys chances of cutting their power. St. Josephs boys arrive for the fight, but Danny tells Mr Bronson that they are supporters who have come to smash the teacher's cars. Bronson confronts the St. Josephs mob who have no knowledge of the protest. Realising that he has been duped, Bronson rushes back to the common room only to discover that it has been abandoned; all of the sit-in protesters have used the diversion to escape.
23	Episode Twenty-Three	David Angus	John Smith	24 March 1987
The ringleaders involved in the sit-in are punished by Mrs McCluskey who insists that the changes which the protest aimed to achieve were already under review for implementation next term, making the whole sit-in a pointless fiasco. Fay and Julie want to hold an engagement party in the school canteen on a Saturday, they convince Mr Griffiths that the party is in his honour so that he will open up the school. Gonch, Ziggy, Hollo and Savage create a ghost-catching routine which scares Cleaver and sends him running straight into Mr Scott. A cricket match is being planned between staff and Students, but against normal convention, with female players.
24	Episode Twenty-Four	David Angus	John Smith	27 March 1987
It is the school cricket match. During the game the canteen is being prepared for the surprise engagement party. Cleaver locks the canteen door behind Hollo in retaliation for a ghost joke, trapping a group of people inside. Perry uses his personal alarm to attract attention, but it is Jackie who comes to their aid and she sees a banner for the party. Ant Jones gets turned away from playing in the match as he is no longer a Student of Grange Hill but is placed as Ziggy's runner since he was the one who injured his leg. The match is a draw and Gonch is forced to pay all bets. Georgina decides to end things with Ant. Roland's fund-raiser diet ends and donations are made to Danny's special care hospital. Zammo and Jackie announce that they have decided to postpone their wedding. The party continues regardless – in honour of Mr Griffiths. Final appearances: Zammo McGuire, Jackie Wright, Steven Banks, Roland Browning, Fay Lucas, Paul Holloway, Ant Jones, Mr Kennedy, Mr Scott, Miss Partridge and more.

== Release history ==
The tenth series of Grange Hill was released by Eureka Entertainment on DVD on the 19th October 2020 in an eight DVD set alongside series nine and the 1985 Christmas special.

The tenth series was released on the streaming site BritBox in July 2022.
