= Grange Hill series 11 =

Grange Hill
- Season 11
- No. of episodes: 20

Release
- Original network: BBC One
- Original release: 5 January – 11 March 1988

Season chronology
- ← Previous; Series 10 Next → Series 12

The eleventh series of the British television drama series Grange Hill began broadcasting on 5 January 1988, before ending on 11 March 1988 on BBC One. The series follows the lives of the staff and students of the eponymous school, an inner-city London comprehensive school. It consists of twenty episodes.

== Cast and characters ==
=== Students ===
- Jonathan Lambeth as Danny Kendall
- Fiona Lee-Fraser as Laura Reagan
- Alison McLaughlin as Louise Webb
- Sara Peters as Julia Glover
- Simon Vaughan as Freddie Mainwaring
- Simone Hyams as Calley Donnington
- John Drummond as Trevor Cleaver
- Tina Mahon as Ronnie Birtles
- John Alford as Robbie Wright
- John McMahon as Gonch Gardner
- Steve West as Vince Savage
- Ruth Carraway as Helen Kelly
- Joann Kenny as Jane Bishop
- Samantha Lewis as Georgina Hayes
- George Christopher as Ziggy Greaves
- Ian Congdon-Lee as Ted Fisk
- Joshua Fenton as Mauler McCaul
- Michelle Gayle as Fiona Wilson
- Rachel Victoria Roberts as Justine Dean
- Sonya Kearns as Chrissy Mainwaring
- Paul Adams as Matthew Pearson
- Sean Maguire as Tegs Ratcliffe
- Lynne Radford as Susi Young
- Darren Cudjoe as Clarke Trent

=== Staff ===
- Gwyneth Powell as Mrs Bridget McClusky
- Nicholas Donnelly as Mr Craig McKenzie
- George A. Cooper as Mr Eric Griffiths
- Karen Ford as Miss Ginny Booth
- Michael Sheard as Mr Maurice Bronson
- Lucinda Curtis as Mrs Liz Reagan
- Stuart Organ as Mr Peter Robson
- Madelaine Church as Mrs Margaret Stone

== Episodes ==
No.	Episode	Writer	Director	Original airdate
1	Episode One	Chris Ellis	Albert Barber	5 January 1988
As the school gates open for a new school year, Ziggy and Robbie wish it was still the summer holidays.
2	Episode Two	Chris Ellis	Albert Barber	8 January 1988
Chrissy wants to be famous. Matthew decides to skip class.
3	Episode Three	David Angus	Albert Barber	12 January 1988
Ziggy and Robbie find themselves becoming involved in Gonch's latest money making scheme. Mr Bronson is shocked by Helen's excuse for not having done her homework.
4	Episode Four	David Angus	Albert Barber	15 January 1988
Ronnie is taken to see some hip hop being performed by her new friend Fiona. Georgina is upset when Mauler tries to kiss her.
5	Episode Five	David Angus	John Smith	19 January 1988
Matthew lies about what happened over the weekend. Tegs attempts to get even with Mauler.
6	Episode Six	David Angus	John Smith	22 January 1988
Gonch's money making scheme causes problems for himself.
7	Episode Seven	Sarah Daniels	John Smith	26 January 1988
Things go wrong when Mauler attempts to gain revenge on Tegs. Helen has a secret which she isn't telling anybody.
8	Episode Eight	Sarah Daniels	John Smith	29 January 1988
Laura isn't happy when she learns her mother has a new boyfriend. Mr Bronson gets even with Mauler.
9	Episode Nine	Margaret Simpson	Robert Gabriel	2 February 1988
Ronnie and Fiona practice their hip hop routine they have been working on. Danny offers to provide the sounds for them.
10	Episode Ten	Margaret Simpson	Robert Gabriel	5 February 1988
Freddie isn't happy when he learns he will have to learn dance instead of playing football. The boys decide to do something about Mauler.
11	Episode Eleven	Margaret Simpson	Robert Gabriel	9 February 1988
Gonch finds himself in trouble. Chrissy and Susi's badge idea becomes a craze around the school.
12	Episode Twelve	David Angus	Albert Barber	12 February 1988
Ronnie and Fiona enter the hip hop competition. Mrs Reagan throws a dinner party. Ronnie borrows some money from her mother without telling her.
13	Episode Thirteen	Kay Trainer	Albert Barber	16 February 1988
Mr McKenzie is worried about Matthew. Laura isn't happy with Simon's actions after she learns from Julia what he tried to do.
14	Episode Fourteen	Barry Purchese	Albert Barber	19 February 1988
Tegs takes Justine to tea at his aunt’s house but it turns out not to be his aunt’s house after all. Freddie is upset that Mr Robson isn't picking the best players for the school's football team.
15	Episode Fifteen	Barry Purchese	Albert Barber	23 February 1988
Ziggy gets a group together to help deal with Mauler, but Mr. Griffiths ends up getting in the way. Ronnie is tempted into shoplifting but ends up getting caught.
16	Episode Sixteen	Barry Purchese	John Smith	26 February 1988
Matthew tells Mr. Mackenzie about his drunken father. Calley and the girls decide to own up about their shoplifting in an effort to help Ronnie.
17	Episode Seventeen	Barry Purchese	John Smith	1 March 1988
Gonch starts a new babysitting business with Ziggy, but first he needs to get them some temporary girlfriends. The girls own up to Mrs McCluskey about their shoplifting.
18	Episode Eighteen	Barry Purchese	John Smith	4 March 1988
The girls learn a tough lesson from Mrs McCluskey about shop lifting. Both Calley and Robbie get ready to go on their first date together but when Calley is late Robbie thinks he has been stood up.
19	Episode Nineteen	Margaret Simpson	John Smith	8 March 1988
The police issue Ronnie with a caution. Efforts to finally get Calley and Robbie together don't go to plan.
20	Episode Twenty	Margaret Simpson	Robert Gabriel	11 March 1988
It's "Wear What You Like" day on the final day of term. Mauler's gang have one last chance to get even with Ziggy before he may leave the school for good.

== Release history ==
As of 2022, the eleventh series of Grange Hill has not been released on DVD.

In July 2022, the eleventh series was added to the streaming platform BritBox.
