= Grange Hill series 9 =

Season of television series

Grange Hill
- Season 9
- No. of episodes: 24

Release
- Original network: BBC One
- Original release: 7 January – 1 April 1986

Season chronology
- ← Previous; Series 8 Next → Series 10

The ninth series of the British television drama series Grange Hill began broadcasting on 7 January 1986, and ended on 1 April 1986 on BBC One. The series follows the lives of the staff and Students of the eponymous school, an inner-city London comprehensive school. It consists of twenty-four episodes.

== Cast and characters ==
=== Students ===
- Lee MacDonald as Zammo McGuire
- Erkan Mustafa as Roland Browning
- Alison Bettles as Fay Lucas
- Simone Nylander as Janet St. Clair
- Lisa York as Julie Marchant
- Melissa Wilks as Jackie Wright
- Mmoloki Christie as Kevin Baylon
- Tim Polley as Banksy Banks
- Amma Asante as Cheryl Webb
- Jonathan Lambeth as Danny Kendall
- Fiona Lee-Fraser as Laura Reagan
- Alison McLaughlin as Louise Webb
- Sara McGlasson as Julia Glover
- Ricky Simmonds as Ant Jones
- Simone Hyams as Calley Donnington
- John Drummond as Trevor Cleaver
- Tina Mahon as Ronnie Birtles
- John Alford as Robbie Wright
- John Holmes as Luke 'Gonch' Gardner
- Steve West as Vince Savage
- Ruth Carraway as Helen Kelly
- Joann Kenny as Jane Bishop
- Bradley Sheppard as Hollo Holloway
- Fleur Taylor as Imelda Davis
- Alison Etienne as Sharon Burton
- Samantha Lewis as Georgina Hayes
- George Wilson as Eric 'Ziggy' Greaves

=== Teachers ===
- Michael Cronin as Mr Geoff Baxter
- Gwyneth Powell as Mrs Bridget McClusky
- Nicholas Donnelly as Mr Craig McKenzie
- George A. Cooper as Mr Eric Griffiths
- Karen Ford as Miss Ginny Booth
- Michael Sheard as Mr Maurice Bronson
- Lucinda Curtis as Mrs Liz Reagan
- Jeffery Kissoon as Mr Chris Kennedy
- Karen Lewis as Miss Roz Partridge
- David Straun as Mr Peter King

== Episodes ==
No.	Episode	Writer	Director	Original airdate
1	Episode One	Barry Purchese	Edward Pugh	7 January 1986
There are some new faces at Grange Hill and some changes. Annette has moved to Milton Keynes and Ziggy has arrived from Liverpool. Mr Humphries, the headmaster, has disappeared and Zammo has fallen out with Jackie. Imelda plants a frog in someone's crisp packet and creates havoc in assembly. Trevor and Vince nick Ziggy's bag but it turns out to be Ant Jones's. Also, Ant doesn't get on well with his new tutor, Mr Bronson. Caretaker Mr Griffiths catches Danny Kendall smoking and chases after him, but on the way Danny runs into Mr Baxter. Mrs. McClusky finds out that the Headmaster has been killed in a car crash. Outside, Ziggy is playing with a spider, explaining that he got his nickname from the Bowie record "Spiders From Mars". Imelda arrives and promptly stamps on it and Ziggy pushes her into a fountain. First Appearances: Eric "Ziggy" Greaves, Danny Kendall, Ant Jones, Julia Glover, Laura Reagan, Mrs Reagan, Miss Partridge, Mr Kennedy, Mr King and more.
2	Episode Two	Barry Purchese	Edward Pugh	10 January 1986
Mr Baxter starts a swimming team and Ziggy volunteers. Danny Kendall thinks an out-of-bounds room is a good place for a smoke but it's already occupied. He's cornered by older kids but breaks a pipe and sets off the fire alarm to escape. Imelda also finds the off-limits room and finds some fibreglass and puts it down the back of a 1st former. Mr Kennedy wonders why Zammo needed the money so badly.
3	Episode Three	David Angus	Edward Pugh	14 January 1986
Everyone's wondering what is behind the plaster on Mr Bronson's neck and some suggest it could be a love bite. Mr King warns E2 to stay clear of fibreglass because it causes thousands of tiny cuts to the skin and Ronnie Birtles suspects Imelda. Ziggy tells on Imelda in art and she puts fibreglass down his back. Meanwhile, Mr. Griffiths finds the off-limits area in the Upper School is on fire and sounds the alarm, but after the many false alarms Mr Bronson does not dismiss his class. The firemen are angry that the building has been evacuated so late. Mr King finds Ziggy with an injured back but doesn't snitch. The fire is put out, but there's further bad news - the place is full of asbestos dust and the whole building needs to be closed indefinitely.
4	Episode Four	David Angus	Edward Pugh	17 January 1986
Robbie Wright comes to school with a pierced ear. Due to the fire of the Upper School, everyone is crammed into the Lower School with some lessons taking place in the hall, which is causing stress for some teachers. Julia finds out what is behind the plaster on Mr Bronson's neck -- a parrot bite. Mr Kennedy gives E2 the task of writing letters to famous people.
5	Episode Five	Margaret Simpson	Roger Singleton-Turner	21 January 1986
Mrs Reagan lost out being head of PE to Mr Baxter due to Julia's dad. Julia feels guilty and apologises to Laura. In the hall, Danny isn't paying attention in History and wants to join another class. Zammo sold his bike, so Jackie gives him £25 to get it back. Louise throws a party and when Mrs Reagan comes to collect Laura and Julia, it appears Julia has had too much to drink.
6	Episode Six	Margaret Simpson	Roger Singleton-Turner	24 January 1986
Georgina is in trouble with Imelda for going to Louise's party without her or Helen. Gonch starts a sandwich selling business. Fay tells Julia that she fancies Mr King. Ant wins his swimming match, but the girls do badly, At the skip, some copper piping provides cash to buy a toaster. Ronnie gets in trouble for throwing a dishcloth at Mr Griffiths, and has to clear up sweet wrappers for a week. Calley is planning to create a fanzine for the school. Zammo's broke again and Jackie doesn't believe a word he says.
7	Episode Seven	Frances Galleymore	Roger Singleton-Turner	28 January 1986
Gonch starts selling buttered toast at 10p a slice. The portacabins haven't arrived and the staff are losing patience. Mr Bronson is angry with Mr Baxter because he thinks he is using his deputy head position to improve sports resources. Georgina is worried that seeing Ant Jones will provoke violence from Imelda, but Ant reassures that he'll protect her. However, he falls into more trouble with Mr Bronson and cannot make it in time.
8	Episode Eight	Frances Galleymore	Roger Singleton-Turner	31 January 1986
Imelda is winding up Ziggy and as a result of that, a bucket of paint ends up over Mr Griffiths. Gonch starts taking advance orders for toast. The teachers become puzzled by the abundance of toast and the lack of people in the canteen. Ziggy is fast on Imeda's trail but she stops him by entering the girls' toilets. Mr Griffiths finds the toaster and reports to Mrs McClusky. Mr Griffiths gets another bucket over the head as Ziggy accidentally dislodges the ladder. Featuring Patsy Palmer as Natasha.
9	Episode Nine	Sarah Daniels	Margie Barbour	4 February 1986
Danny refuses to participate in Drama and ends up walking out. Zammo has been borrowing money from everyone and is in a hurry to speak to Jackie. At a local café, Mrs Reagan asks her daughter and Julia to investigate Louise Webb's family. Ant has a heart-to-heart with Georgina, who can't leave Imelda's Terrorhawks gang without danger. Zammo is trying to raise money - his rather dubious friend Doug is in his house looking at his mother's belongings.
10	Episode Ten	Sarah Daniels	Margie Barbour	7 February 1986
The temporary classrooms have arrived at last – with Imelda hiding inside one of them. Mr Baxter and Mr Bronson seem surprised to find out the crane driver is a woman. Gonch takes Ziggy's letter from the Duke of Edinburgh Award Scheme, since Ziggy hasn't arrived yet, and decides to make it more interesting, by telling him that Prince Philip himself will visit and that he wants him to collect as much chalk as possible. Mr King asks Imelda about her letter to Rentokil – apparently she asked if rat poison would work on humans! Ziggy and Robbie's attempt to water-balloon Imelda leads to more damage.
11	Episode Eleven	John Godber	David Bell	11 February 1986
Mrs McClusky has come up with the idea of a logo design competition since the merger between Grange Hill, Rodney Bennett and Brookdale. Ziggy starts collecting chalk for the fake Duke of Edinburgh award invented by Gonch. Ant's having trouble finding Georgina because of Imelda. Some of the first years find their own way around Imelda's timetable corner-cutting idea by cutting it themselves so they don't have to pay. Ant fetches Georgina before the staff catch up with her but Imelda isn't happy. Ant comforts Georgina but Mr Bronson is outraged by the display of affection and grabs hold of Ant. He pushes him off and Mr Bronson falls. Imelda is chased, caught and suspended. Ant is told he must apologise to Mr Bronson or face suspension.
12	Episode Twelve	Barry Purchese	David Bell	14 February 1986
Danny Kendall has to stay in Mr Baxter's office all morning. Ant Jones is adamant that he won't apologise. Danny spots an error in the logo competition and offers to go round and fix the posters with a felt-tip. He persuades Ant to apologize for pushing Mr Bronson. Ziggy was just about to raid his cupboard when Mr Baxter points out Edinburgh is misspelt.
13	Episode Thirteen	Margaret Simpson	David Bell	18 February 1986
It is a half-term holiday and Robbie and Ziggy go to London. Laura and Julia are out shopping and are planning to go to an all-night party. They bump into Louise who is looking after her brothers but doesn't seem to want to talk. At the River Thames, Ziggy and Robbie sneak onto a pleasure boat, pretending to be part of a group, but they are caught, and are fast running out of money. Robbie tells Ziggy he saw bodies in an open crypt and they decide to go back there. After searching, they find the place but it has been turned into houses. When they get back to the tube station, the ticket collector recognises them and tells them they'll have to walk home.
14	Episode Fourteen	Margaret Simpson	David Bell	21 February 1986
It is still the holidays and Zammo comes round to the Arcade where Roland works part-time and asks for £50. Roland isn't sure at first, but Zammo persuades him. Julia Glover tells her bossy dad that she's going to stay with Laura's dad with Laura when they are actually off to an all-night party. Julia and Laura have difficulty finding the right place and Julia's dad goes to see Laura's mum. When they finally find the right place, it is a huge disappointment and they head home. At Laura's, Julie locks herself in their bathroom and refuses to go home, so she stays at Laura's. Back at the arcade, Roland's about to leave when he realises that Zammo has not come out of the back room. Zammo is in there - slumped on the ground, his eyes glazed, and the truth of his drug habit is clear.
15	Episode Fifteen	Rosemary Mason	John Smith	25 February 1986
The portable classrooms are at the school at last. Danny asks one of the men for a cigarette and Mr Baxter catches him. Imelda is back from suspension and is up to her old tricks. R2 are in registration with E2 since their form teacher has been held up. People are beginning to return overdue library books due to the amnesty and Mr Griffiths is trying to catch people out who are bringing books back late. In the staff room, the staff aren't too keen on staff smoking due to the stench. There is a SPEC (Staff Student Editorial Committee) meeting. Meanwhile, Gonch and a few other lads are winding Mr Griffiths up by running around with books. At the meeting, they are struggling to decide on what to put in the fanzine until Calley shows some around. E2 are having their Drama class in the cloakroom and it smells of cigarettes. Fay bumps into Mr King in town and they go for coffee to discuss the magazine. Laura and Julia see Fay in the cafe. Mrs McClusky sees Gonch and his friends with the books and tells them all to write an essay on the book on the top of their piles. Julia and Laura visit Louise Webb when she doesn't turn up at school. They find that her parents aren't there and she and her sister are looking after the house. Gonch goes to tell Mr Griffiths that the school is to become a smoke-free zone – and that includes him as he's just set fire to his cardigan.
16	Episode Sixteen	Rosemary Mason	John Smith	28 February 1986
Laura pins up an anti-smoking poster on the wall of the new portable classroom and she and Ant get in trouble. Danny enters the logo competition under the name "Eamon McClusky". Mr Bronson and Ant meet up with Mr Baxter, but Ant is fuming with what Mr Bronson says and storms out. The Students are spying on the staff to make sure they give up smoking and the Students give them special chewing gum to help. Miss Booth is bad-tempered by giving up smoking. The Students send the staff jogging with Mrs Reagan to take their minds off smoking. Danny wins the competition and is disappointed when he wins a book token and is even unhappy when a remark is made, causing him to run out. Miss Booth goes looking for him. She finds him and Danny suggests a speaking wall where anyone can write anything they feel. Gonch and his friends are making Mr Griffiths give up smoking. Laura and Julia visit Louise but they learn her dad has died. Mr Bronson catches Ant and gives him 500 lines.
17	Episode Seventeen	Margaret Simpson	John Smith	4 March 1986
Julia's dad reads the school magazine and is shocked to find out the Students smoke. The governors are trying to ban the school magazine, so Calley and Fay distribute them round the school. Danny starts on the speaking wall and Mr Griffiths isn't happy. Zammo is cashing a dodgy pension at the post office for Tamsin when he sees Banksie. Miss Booth persuades Mrs McClusky to have the speaking wall. Mrs McClusky holds a SPEC meeting about the smoking tables and they agree to keep the staff table, but not the Student one. Julie sees Fay in Mr King's car and they arrange a date. E2 are going swimming with Mrs Reagan and Mr Baxter. Ziggy and Robbie are sent out of the pool for messing about, so they go to the changing rooms and take what appear to be Imelda's clothes. However, when they are ready to leave, Imelda is dressed and the clothes are actually Jane's.
18	Episode Eighteen	Margaret Simpson	Roger Singleton-Turner	7 March 1986
Miss Partridge, Julia and Laura visits Louise and Cheryl after their dad died and they are looking after their brothers and they persuade Cheryl and Louise to go to social services. Danny starts work on the speaking wall. Laura finds Louise in tears in the toilets and she says a social worker is going to take her and her family into care. When they arrive late for Mr Bronson's class, Mr Bronson gives them detention, but Ant sticks up for Louise. Mr Bronson takes Ant to see Mrs McClusky and Ant gets sent home. Calley tells Jane that it was Ziggy who threw her clothes in the pool and they plan revenge. Cheryl and Louise go with Miss Partridge and have a meeting with a social worker and tells them that they may be able to stay at home and the council will be responsible for them. After, they go to the cafe and see Fay and Mr King together.
19	Episode Nineteen	Barry Purchese	Roger Singleton-Turner	11 March 1986
Zammo goes round to Roly's house and takes his alarm clock. The fifth years are revising for their French oral examination. Zammo doesn't speak in his exam and the examiner isn't impressed with him. Roland hasn't turned up for his exam since Zammo took his alarm clock. Mrs McClusky is surprised to learn that a video recorder has gone missing from the school. Ant Jones' parents come and meet with Mrs McClusky and Mr Baxter. Everyone is getting on well until Mr Bronson turns up. Roland turns up to school out of breath and tells Mr Bronson someone stole his alarm clock. Mr Bronson persuades the examiner to let Roland do his exam. Miss Partridge warns Mr King people are talking about him and Fay. Cheryl and Louise ask Miss Partridge if she can come to the social worker with them but she seems in a hurry. Two police officers turn up at school with Roland and Kevin and they speak with Mr Kennedy. They say that the video recorder has been found at a second hand shop and the person was wearing a Grange Hill uniform. One of the police officers tell Mr Kennedy that the boy told the shop keeper his name was Kevin Baylon. The police later go to Zammo's house and tell his mum that he's been selling things to pay for drugs. Zammo's mum is shocked to learn that Zammo takes drugs.
20	Episode Twenty	Barry Purchese	Margie Barbour	14 March 1986
Ant wants to pull out of the swimming team; meanwhile Danny is working on the speaking wall and pulling in people to help him. Imelda is planning to get Georgina because she is seeing Ant still. Mrs McClusky visits Zammo and his mum. Zammo's mum is shattered with looking after Zammo, so she pops to the shop whilst Mrs McClusky stays with Zammo. Laura, Cheryl and Louise ask Ant if his dad can trace Louise and Cheryl's mum since he is a solicitor. Louise, Cheryl and Laura visit Mr Jones and he agrees to help them. After, everything appears calm in the Jones' household until Ant realises Mr Baxter has phoned his parents about quitting the swimming team. Danny and his speaking wall helpers are summoned to Mrs McClusky when something about Zammo is written on the wall. Fay stops by the third year notice board and Julie knows why – she's waiting for Mr King. Imelda, Sharon and Helen go after Georgina, who is alone. Robbie and Ziggy are on the roof waiting for Imelda, but their plan backfires when Imelda walks off. Danny sees that the mural has been whitewashed and is horrified.
21	Episode Twenty-One	Barry Purchese	Margie Barbour	18 March 1986
Graffiti is written on the speaking wall about Fay and Mr King and Miss Partridge's child. Ziggy and Robbie take over Janet's bookstall. However, the boys add a twist—they put the books in paper bags, put an autograph in one of the books and charge 50p. Mr Bronson sees Ant about his options and says he can't do the ones he has chosen because he has to choose a subject from each column. The 5th years have an English Lit exam and Fay breaks down in tears. Zammo takes the opportunity to go to the toilets and hide his drugs. Jackie alerts Miss Booth and Mr Kennedy goes to check on him. Janet catches Ziggy and Robbie and she isn't impressed at first but they reassure her. A governors' meeting has been called about Miss Partridge and Mr King. Ant is furious when he finds out Julia managed to get her O level options passed and Ant had exactly the same. Zammo can't concentrate in the exam and has to get back to the toilets. He is upset when he gets there to find his drugs destroyed and wet. Julia is fed up of her dad dictating her life and tells Laura she is getting her ears pierced, which her dad has forbidden her to do. Mr Kennedy find what Zammo went for and shows Miss Booth. Robbie sees Mr King packing up all his things – he has resigned. At the governors' meeting, Mrs McClusky makes it clear that she is going to do whatever she can to save Miss Partridge. Ant waits until after the meeting and confronts Mr Bronson in front of Mr Glover, Mrs McClusky and Mr Baxter about his options and how Julia got hers passed and then storms off.
22	Episode Twenty-Two	Barry Purchese	Margie Barbour	21 March 1986
A school newsletter is being brought out in an attempt to help Miss Partridge. Ant has gone missing after the argument between him and Mr Bronson. Georgina is asked by Mrs McClusky if she knows where he is. E2's math lesson is being covered by Mrs McClusky. Zammo tells Jackie he is over his drug addiction by pouring a packet of drugs down the kitchen sink. Mr Glover visits the school to complain that Julia had her ears pierced during school hours, but Mr Baxter tells him it's not their problem since it was in the lunch hour. Mr Baxter sells Mr Glover a copy of the school magazine and signs him up for the fun run. Miss Booth tries to persuade Danny to make some anti-drug posters, but Danny won't cooperate because the speaking wall was white washed. Jackie tells Zammo's mum that Zammo is over the drugs because he threw his heroin away. However, Zammo's mum's cash card goes missing and she turns up at the school and tells Mrs McClusky she knows Zammo is going to have drugs on him. She asks Mrs McClusky to call the police to catch her son before it goes too far. In the locker room, Kevin and Jackie confront Zammo. Zammo tips out his bag in order to convince he is clear, but when Jackie picks up his calculator, Zammo gets cross and over-protective of his calculator. Jackie finds a packet of white powder hidden in his calculator. Zammo hits Kevin to stop Jackie tipping out the content and Zammo tries to scoop as much of it up as he can. The police, Mrs McClusky, Mr Kennedy and his mum burst in.
23	Episode Twenty-Three	David Angus	Margie Barbour	25 March 1986
Rumours are circulating about what happened to Zammo when the police came to the school. Ant is still missing and is living in an abandoned building which is filthy. Banksie and Mr Kennedy are still competing against each other and reckon they could beat each other in the fun run. Mrs McClusky tells Danny his badge from the logo competition is going to become the new school logo. Danny isn't thrilled and doesn't want to be remembered. Miss Booth tries to persuade Jackie to see Zammo, but she doesn't want to. Meanwhile, Ant steals some fruit from the market stall outside and posters are being made in an attempt to find him. Mr Jones visits Mrs McClusky and tells her he wants Ant out of Mr Bronson's class, but Mrs McClusky tries to tell him she can't. Mr Jones then says he is going to move Ant to another school. Kevin sees Jackie in tears and he offers to go with Jackie to visit Zammo. The Webb's aunt is moving in and Laura and Mrs Reagan go and meet her. Miss Booth visits Zammo and he is clearly upset when Miss Booth is trying to cover up why Jackie didn't come. Mrs Partridge comes to school and hands in her resignation, but Mrs McClusky refuses to take it. Ziggy and Robbie spot Ant and try to make a citizen's arrest.
24	Episode Twenty-Four	David Angus	Margie Barbour	1 April 1986
Mrs McClusky and Mr Baxter put a plan in place to save Miss Partridge - by handing in their resignation if the whole matter isn't dropped. Jackie, Kevin, Roly, Cheryl and Janet are in the café talking about Zammo and drugs. Jackie walks away when the whole topic gets too much for her. Ziggy's received a free invite to a Gala Performance for his chalk contribution and tells Gonch, who can't believe it after he started it by giving Ziggy a fake letter. It's the fun run and Gonch takes bets on who won't get around. Imelda, who is on roller skates, snatches Ziggy's letter. Imelda and Helen loosen the wheels on what appears to be Ziggy's vehicle. Mr Bronson, who is on a tricycle, speaks to Ant, who is starting St Joseph's after the holidays. Helen and Imelda realised they went after the wrong vehicle and the one they did damage turned out to be Mr Glover's. Ziggy and Robbie finally get their own back on Imelda. Mr Kennedy and Banksie finally call their competing a day and cross the finishing line together. Final Appearance: Mr. Baxter, Janet St Clair, and Kevin Baylon

== Release history ==
The ninth series of Grange Hill was released in the UK by Eureka Entertainment on DVD on 19 October 2020 in an eight DVD set alongside series ten and the 1985 Christmas special.

The ninth series was also added to the UK streaming site BritBox in January 2022.
