= Grange Hill series 14 =

Grange Hill
- Season 14
- No. of episodes: 20

Release
- Original network: BBC One
- Original release: 8 January – 15 March 1991

Season chronology
- ← Previous; Series 13 Next → Series 15

The fourteenth series of the British television drama series Grange Hill began broadcasting on 8 January 1991, before ending on 15 March 1991 on BBC One. The series follows the lives of the staff and Students of the eponymous school, an inner-city London comprehensive school. It consists of twenty episodes.

== Cast and characters ==
=== Students ===
- Simone Hyams as Calley Donnington
- John McMahon as Trevor Cleaver
- Samantha Lewis as Georgina Hayes
- Ian Congdon-Lee as Ted Fisk
- René Zagger as Mike Bentley
- Rachel Victoria Roberts as Justine Dean
- Sonya Kearns as Chrissy Mainwaring
- Paul Adams as Matthew Pearson
- Sean Maguire as Tegs Ratcliffe
- Julie Buckfield as Natalie Stevens
- Kelly George as Ray Haynes
- Desmond Askew as Richard
- Luisa Bradshaw-White as Maria Watts
- Rebekah Joy Gilgan as Fran Williams
- David Shane as Barry Timpson
- Natalie Poyser as Becky Stevens
- Margo Selby as Julie Corrigan
- Jamie Lehane as Jacko Morgan
- Ian Steele as Brian Shaw
- Alice Dawnay as Alice Rowe
- Nina Fry as Robyn Stone
- John Pickard as Neil Timpson
- Otis Munyangiri as Locko Lockery
- Sundeep Suri as Akik Rashim

=== Teachers ===
- Gwyneth Powell as Mrs Bridget McClusky
- Nicholas Donnelly as Mr Craig McKenzie
- George A. Cooper as Mr Eric Griffiths
- Karen Ford as Miss Ginny Booth
- Stuart Organ as Mr Peter Robson
- Lee Cornes as Mr Jeff Hankin
- Kevin O'Shea as Mr Max Hargreaves
- Anna Quayle as Mrs Kate Monroe
- William Brand as Mr Jan Van Der Groot

=== Others ===
- Tina Mahon as Ronnie Birtles (episode 2)

== Episodes ==
No.	Episode	Writer	Director	Original airdate
1	Episode One	Sarah Daniels	Riitta-Leena Lynn	8 January 1991
Mr. Van Der Groot manages to impress his Students. The heating system at the school causes problems.
2	Episode Two	Kay Trainer	Riitta-Leena Lynn	11 January 1991
Trevor manages to get some work experience at a local Estate Agent. Calley gets her hospital test results which come back clear. Note: Final appearance of Veronica "Ronnie" Birtles.
3	Episode Three	Kay Trainer	Riitta-Leena Lynn	15 January 1991
Becky and Alice spy on the teachers and start a peaceful canteen protest. Matthew watches the "smugglers" from the tree-house in Richard's garden.
4	Episode Four	Barry Purchese	Riitta-Leena Lynn	18 January 1991
Jacko and his friends attempt to get to Edinburgh. Georgina doesn't wait in for Mike when he is late. Justine learns from Tegs that he is moving to Germany.
5	Episode Five	Barry Purchese	Richard Kelly	22 January 1991
Mike gets the chance to train in America. Jack and Locko pay Brian a visit who is very sick.
6	Episode Six	Margaret Simpson	Richard Kelly	25 January 1991
Julie finds herself being ignored. Mike finds out about the dance Georgina shared with Don. Trevor begins to sell takeaway pizzas in the school playground.
7	Episode Seven	Kevin Hood	Richard Kelly	29 January 1991
The school begins to charge its Students for the use of lockers. Mr. Robson is involved in an accident while he and Mike are out on his motorcycle.
8	Episode Eight	Chris Ellis	Richard Kelly	1 February 1991
Alice and Becky find out that Chrissy is going to have a baby. Ms. Booth offers Chrissy some advice. Cecile gives Mike a visa application for America.
9	Episode Nine	Margaret Simpson	Albert Barber	5 February 1991
The news that Chrissy is pregnant is spread around the school along with the false rumour that the father is Mr. Van Der Groot. Julie is desperate to be liked.
10	Episode Ten	Margaret Simpson	Albert Barber	8 February 1991
Trevor gives up the lunchtime pizza business. Julie ends up going missing.
11	Episode Eleven	Barry Purchese	Richard Kelly	12 February 1991
Alice is taught a lesson in victimisation by Mrs Monroe. Richard sells some t-shirts to help raise money for Matthew. The contents of the smuggler's shed are finally revealed.
12	Episode Twelve	Chris Ellis	Albert Barber	15 February 1991
Justine works out that Chrissy is pregnant after all and lied about her test results on a school trip to Dartmoor.
13	Episode Thirteen	Chris Ellis	Albert Barber	19 February 1991
The Students have to take part in one last initiative test on the Dartmoor trip. Matthew is able to get even with Ray and Richard. Trevor and Ted's dinner party fails to impress Georgina and Calley.
14	Episode Fourteen	Sarah Daniels	Richard Kelly	22 February 1991
News that Chrissy is going to have a baby spreads around the school. Mrs. McCluskey decides to retire.
15	Episode Fifteen	Kevin Hood	Richard Kelly	26 February 1991
A model boat race is held at the school. The true about what the "smugglers" are up to is revealed. Brian needs a bone marrow transplant.
16	Episode Sixteen	David Angus	Richard Kelly	1 March 1991
Mr. Robson finds out about the pizza business. Georgina attempts to make Calley see that she needs to get glasses. Chrissy's father isn't happy to find out that his daughter is pregnant.
17	Episode Seventeen	Kevin Hood	David Andrews	5 March 1991
Interviews take part for the headmaster position at the school. Matthew invites his friends around to see his new flat. Ray ruins Nick's jacket whilst on a night out.
18	Episode Eighteen	David Angus	David Andrews	8 March 1991
Jamie sends Fran a letter. Nick is furious after seeing what Ray has done to his jacket. Calley's hotel work experience goes well.
19	Episode Nineteen	David Angus	Albert Barber	12 March 1991
Ms. Booth takes part in a sponsored run. Jamie shows up unexpectedly to see Fran. Ted is invited to Chrissy's house.
20	Episode Twenty	Sarah Daniels	David Andrews	15 March 1991
Mrs. McClusky is given a musical send off on her final day at the school and is given a variety of leaving presents.

== Release history ==
The fourteenth series of Grange Hill was released on BritBox and ITVx on 20 July 2023, so far, it has yet to be released on DVD.
