= Grange Hill series 13 =

British television drama series

Grange Hill
- Season 13
- No. of episodes: 20

Release
- Original network: BBC One
- Original release: 2 January – 9 March 1990

Season chronology
- ← Previous; Series 12 Next → Series 14

The thirteenth series of the British television drama series Grange Hill began broadcasting on 2 January 1990, before ending on 9 March 1990 on BBC One. The series follows the lives of the staff and Students of the eponymous school, an inner-city London comprehensive school. It consists of twenty episodes.

It marked a change from earlier series with the introduction of a new theme tune and incidental music.

== Cast and characters ==
=== Students ===
- Simone Hyams as Calley Donnington
- John Drummond as Trevor Cleaver
- Tina Mahon as Ronnie Birtles
- John Alford as Robbie Wright
- Samantha Lewis as Georgina Hayes
- Ian Congdon-Lee as Ted Fisk
- Joshua Fenton as Mauler McCaul
- René Zagger as Mike Bentley
- Veena Tulsiani as Aichaa Rashim
- Rachel Victoria Roberts as Justine Dean
- Sonya Kearns as Chrissy Mainwaring
- Paul Adams as Matthew Pearson
- Sean Maguire as Tegs Ratcliffe
- Julie Buckfield as Natalie Stevens
- David Shane as Barry Timpson
- Natalie Poyser as Becky Stevens
- Margo Selby as Julie Corrigan
- Jamie Lehane as Jacko Morgan
- Ian Steele as Brian Shaw
- Alice Dawnay as Alice Rowe
- John Pickard as Neil Timpson
- Otis Munyangiri as Locko Lockery
- Sundeep Suri as Akik Rashim

=== Teachers ===
- Gwyneth Powell as Mrs Bridget McClusky
- Nicholas Donnelly as Mr Craig McKenzie
- George A. Cooper as Mr Eric Griffiths
- Karen Ford as Miss Ginny Booth
- Stuart Organ as Mr Peter Robson
- Lee Cornes as Mr Jeff Hankin
- Kevin O'Shea as Mr Max Hargreaves
- Anna Quayle as Mrs Kate Monroe

== Episodes ==
No.	Episode	Writer	Director	Original airdate
1	Episode One	Barry Purchese	John Smith	2 January 1990
Jacko's dog causes problems on the first day of term. The new Deputy Head at the school imposes his discipline on Mauler and Ted.
2	Episode Two	John Smith	John Smith	5 January 1990
Neil Timpson tricks Locko. Tegs is still acting strangely around Justine.
3	Episode Three	Chris Ellis	John Smith	9 January 1990
Mr. Hargreaves continues to get on the nerves of his fellow staff members. Georgina is finding it hard to get things moving with Mike Bentley.
4	Episode Four	Margaret Simpson	John Smith	12 January 1990
Georgina and her friends get some glamour photos taken hoping that they will appear in a magazine. Robbie and Mike find themselves involved in a pub fight.
5	Episode Five	Margaret Simpson	Andrew Whitman	16 January 1990
Tegs and Matthew end up doing a spot of breaking and entering. Mrs. Monroe ends up getting locked in a cupboard at the school.
6	Episode Six	Kay Trainor	Andrew Whitman	19 January 1990
Mike finally asks Georgina out on a date. Ronnie becomes involved in an animal rights protest outside a local chemist. Mike and Georgina see Calley with her new older boyfriend.
7	Episode Seven	Kay Trainer	Andrew Whitman	23 January 1990
Aichaa learns that one of her pictures is going to be used in the magazine.
8	Episode Eight	David Angus	Andrew Whitman	26 January 1990
Ronnie tries to stop rat dissection at St. Mary's School from taking place. Mauler sells Mr. Hargreaves's photo frame to a local antiques shop.
9	Episode Nine	Barry Purchese	Richard Kelly	30 January 1990
Neil's revenge on the T-shirt girls could end up being more deadly than he intended. Mike reads a newspaper report about the fight at the pub.
10	Episode Ten	Barry Purchese	Richard Kelly	2 February 1990
Aichaa and Georgina go to a modelling agency to see if they can be signed up. The photo frame ends up back at the school. Tegs pays his mother a visit.
11	Episode Eleven	Margaret Simpson	Richard Kelly	6 February 1990
Matthew's home life continues to get worse.
12	Episode Twelve	Margaret Simpson	Richard Kelly	9 February 1990
Mike decides it would be best to drop out of the athletic trials so that he can avoid having his picture taken. The first year Students make chilli con carne to sell as an alternative to the hunger lunches at the school. Julie keeps following Georgina.
13	Episode Thirteen	Sarah Daniels	Riitta-Leena Lynn	13 February 1990
Mike ends up taking part in the race and tells Georgina about the fight. Aichaa goes out on a date with Robbie. Matthew ends up taking some drastic action.
14	Episode Fourteen	Sarah Daniels	Riitta-Leena Lynn	16 February 1990
Matthew's arson attempt sees his problems not improving. The T-shirt business comes to an end. Jacko's dog is found.
15	Episode Fifteen	Kevin Hood	Riitta-Leena Lynn	20 February 1990
Justine finds her reputation is in tatters. Ronnie discovers where Calley's boyfriend works. Robbie and Aichaa go to see a football match but trouble breaks out.
16	Episode Sixteen	Kevin Hood	Riitta-Leena Lynn	23 February 1990
Mr. Hankin's Aunt Camelia helps him to demonstrate acoustics. Calley steals her boyfriend's electronic card to get Ronnie, Georgina and herself into the laboratory.
17	Episode Seventeen	Chris Ellis	Richard Kelly	27 February 1990
Calley, Ronnie and Georgina are allowed to leave. Georgina's first modelling assignments aren't what she was expecting.
18	Episode Eighteen	Barry Purchese	Richard Kelly	2 March 1990
Alice and Becky end up spending a morning at a health club. Matthew has his day in court. Robbie and Mike decide to tell the police what they know about the fight.
19	Episode Nineteen	David Angus	Richard Kelly	6 March 1990
Neil ends up being taught a lesson. Rod's time as a caretaker at the school comes to an end. Mr. Robson arranges a surprise for Mike.
20	Episode Twenty	David Angus	Richard Kelly	9 March 1990
Mike and Robbie go to court and Mike still manages to run the most important race of his life.

== Release history ==
The thirteenth series of Grange Hill has never been released on DVD as of 2022.

In December 2022 ‘’ITV’’ announced that the thirteenth series of ‘’Grange Hill’’ will be available on its streaming platform ITVx as part of its ‘’BritBox’’ content in January 2023.
