= Grange Hill series 12 =

Grange Hill
- Season 12
- No. of episodes: 20

Release
- Original network: BBC One
- Original release: 3 January – 10 March 1989

Season chronology
- ← Previous; Series 11 Next → Series 13

The twelfth series of the British television drama series Grange Hill began broadcasting on 3 January 1989, before ending on 10 March 1989 on BBC One. The series follows the lives of the staff and Students of the eponymous school, an inner-city London comprehensive school. It consists of twenty episodes.

== Cast and characters ==
=== Students ===
- Jonathan Lambeth as Danny Kendall
- Simone Hyams as Calley Donnington
- John Drummond as Trevor Cleaver
- Tina Mahon as Ronnie Birtles
- John Alford as Robbie Wright
- John McMahon as Gonch Gardner
- Steve West as Vince Savage
- Ruth Carraway as Helen Kelly
- Samantha Lewis as Georgina Hayes
- George Christopher as Ziggy Greaves
- Ian Congdon-Lee as Ted Fisk
- Joshua Fenton as Mauler McCaul
- Michelle Gayle as Fiona Wilson
- Melanie Hiscock as Mandy Freemont
- Rachel Victoria Roberts as Justine Dean
- Sonya Kearns as Chrissy Mainwaring
- Paul Adams as Matthew Pearson
- Sean Maguire as Tegs Ratcliffe
- Lynne Radford as Susi Young
- Darren Cudjoe as Clarke Trent

=== Teachers ===
- Gwyneth Powell as Mrs Bridget McClusky
- Nicholas Donnelly as Mr Craig McKenzie
- George A. Cooper as Mr Eric Griffiths
- Karen Ford as Miss Ginny Booth
- Michael Sheard as Mr Maurice Bronson
- Stuart Organ as Mr Peter Robson
- Madelaine Church as Mrs Margaret Stone

== Episodes ==
No.	Episode	Writer	Director	Original airdate
1	Episode One	Barry Purchese	Laurence Williams	3 January 1989
Tegs's brother returns from prison. Mr. Bronson's car breaks down. Danny Kendall gets off to a bad start after he returns to school.
2	Episode Two	Barry Purchese	Albert Barber	6 January 1989
Justine meets Tegs's brother who is still on the run. Vince saves Georgina with his "psychic powers". Gonch has yet another money making scheme.
3	Episode Three	Barry Purchese	Albert Barber	10 January 1989
Trevor continues to be amazed by Vince's psychic powers. Tegs's house is raided by the police.
4	Episode Four	Margaret Simpson	Albert Barber	13 January 1989
Trevor Cleaver and Mauler McCaul gatecrash Ronnie's party.
5	Episode Five	Kay Trainor	John Smith	17 January 1989
After Chrissy is mugged on her way to school, Miss Booth suggests the school introduces self-defence classes. Danny starts work on the new swimming pool mosaic.
6	Episode Six	Kay Trainor	John Smith	20 January 1989
Gonch attempts to get Mandy Freemont to help with the homework service and attempts to impress her.
7	Episode Seven	Chris Ellis	John Smith	24 January 1989
Danny's work experience is sabotaged by Mr Bronson. Justine helps Tegs.
8	Episode Eight	Chris Ellis	John Smith	27 January 1989
Mr Bronson and Ronnie are involved in a collision. Clarke and Matthew attempt to find the missing bike.
9	Episode Nine	Margaret Simpson	Robert Gabriel	31 January 1989
Following Vince's failed prediction, Gonch is after him. Mauler wants a piece of Gonch's Sweepstake. Mauler and Ted chase Gonch and Ziggy through the estate and find Mr Bronson's stolen car. Danny is lying inside it, motionless.
10	Episode Ten	Margaret Simpson	Robert Gabriel	3 February 1989
The Students try to come to terms with Danny Kendall's death and they plant a tree when they hold a memorial service.
11	Episode Eleven	David Angus	John Smith	7 February 1989
Ziggy and Robbie try to hide a drunken Trevor. Mr Bronson pulls out of the Isle of Wight trip.
12	Episode Twelve	David Angus	John Smith	10 February 1989
Mr. Bronson has a change of mind about the Isle of Wight trip. Justine finds out where Tegs has been hiding. Helen begins work experience as an engineer.
13	Episode Thirteen	Margaret Simpson	Robert Gabriel	14 February 1989
Gonch ends up seeing Mandy in a completely different light on the Isle of Wight trip. Georgina's been getting notes from a secret admirer.
14	Episode Fourteen	Margaret Simpson	Robert Gabriel	17 February 1989
Trevor's drinking comes to a dramatic head. Calley goes cold on Robbie. Mandy finds out the reason that Gonch originally asked her out.
15	Episode Fifteen	Barry Purchese	John Smith	21 February 1989
Helen runs into Mauler whilst on her work experience. Mr. Bronson decides to give up teaching.
16	Episode Sixteen	Barry Purchese	John Smith	24 February 1989
Mr. Griffiths, Mauler and Ziggy attempt to find the mystery intruder when it gets dark.
17	Episode Seventeen	Sarah Daniels	Ronald Smedley	28 February 1989
Mauler is looking for a date. The owner of the ferocious dog is discovered by Clarke and Matthew.
18	Episode Eighteen	Sarah Daniels	Ronald Smedley	3 March 1989
Mauler is determined to get even with Gonch. Tegs returns to his old house.
19	Episode Nineteen	David Angus	Ronald Smedley	7 March 1989
The school gets ready for an end of year prom. A present is bought for Mr. Bronson.
20	Episode Twenty	David Angus	Ronald Smedley	10 March 1989
The school prom gets underway. Georgina’s and Ziggy’s friends work together to finally unite them.

== Release History ==
As of 2022, the twelfth series of Grange Hill has not been released on DVD.

In December 2022 ITV announced that the twelfth series of Grange Hill will be available on its streaming platform ITVx as part of its BritBox content in January 2023.
