= Grange Hill series 16 =

Grange Hill
- Season 16
- No. of episodes: 20

Release
- Original network: BBC One
- Original release: 5 January – 12 March 1993

Season chronology
- ← Previous; Series 15 Next → Series 17

The sixteenth series of the British television drama series Grange Hill began broadcasting on 5 January 1993, before ending on 12 March 1993 on BBC One. The series follows the lives of the staff and Students of the eponymous school, an inner-city London comprehensive school. It consists of twenty episodes.

== Cast ==
=== Students ===
- Rachel Victoria Roberts as Justine Dean
- Julie Buckfield as Natalie Stevens
- Kelly George as Ray Haynes
- Luisa Bradshaw-White as Maria Watts
- Rebekah Joy Gilgan as Fran Williams
- Desmond Askew as Richard
- Clare Buckfield as Natasha Stevens
- David Crane as Barry Timpson
- Joseph Kpobie as Mick Daniels
- Jamie Golding as Graham "Grimbo" Pipe
- Christopher McGown as Frank Buttering
- Jamie Lehane as Russell "Jacko" Morgan
- Natalie Poyser as Becky Stevens
- Margo Selby as Julie Corrigan
- Ian Steele as Brian Shaw
- Nina Fry as Robyn Stone
- Mark De Couteau as Stewart
- Darren Kempson as Gabriel
- Helen McDonagh as Mary McCarthy
- Alan Cave as Dennis "Techno" Morris
- Melanie Joseph as Lauren Phillips
- Zander Ward as Andy "Spanner" Walker
- Belinda Crane as Lucy Mitchell
- Steven Hammett as Dudley Wesker
- Natalie Tapper as Jodie Abedayo
- Lee Whitlock as Bevis Loveday

=== Teachers ===
- Stuart Organ as Mr Peter Robson
- Lee Cornes as Mr Jeff Hankin
- Jenny Howe as Mrs Angela Keele
- Adam Ray as Mr Tom Brisley
- Peter Leeper as Mr Malcolm Parrott
- Paul Bigley as Mr Dave Greenman
- Anna Quayle as Mrs Monroe
- Flip Webster as Mrs Mason

=== Others ===
- Denzil Kilvington as Kenny Haynes
- Deborah Manship as Electrician
- Nicky Furro as Cook
- Mark Trotman as Radio DJ
- Ray Edwards as Bruce Galloway
- Joanna Stride as Ruth
- Julia Prague as Sarah Walker
- Lynda Rooke as Mrs Matthews
- Anne Small as Lady In York Avenue
- Greta Lange & Roxanna Stevens as Elizabeth Fry Girls
- Sebastian Mitchinson & Tony McNicholl as St Joseph's Boys
- Evie Garratt as Mrs Sochaski
- Angela Phillips as Caroline
- Christopher Gilling as John
- Freddie Stuart as Ron
- Kristian Wilkin as Jamie
- Katherine Hart as Vikki
- John Conrad as Lawrie
- Nick Timothy as Steve
- Logan Murray as Anthony
- Dominique Pike as Madelaine
- John Hallam as Mr McCarthy
- Clare Perkins as Marcia
- Morven Scott as Kim
- Paul Ridley as Mr Stone
- Lois Butlin as Mrs Stone
- Dawn Kieler as Councillor Jones
- Barbara Pierson as Mrs Williams
- Simon Hunt as Adam
- Dave McEwan as Mr Garner
- Timothy Douek as Simon Garner
- Cathy Warwick as Angie
- David Joyce as Press Photographer
- Rebecca Moloney as Rebecca
- Louise Ashbourne as Miss Hall
- Matt Bradley as Football Manager
- Sam Lathem as Loudmouth
- Vanda Mayer as Claire
- Kenneth Farrington as Sergeant Winter
- Victoria Plum as Inspector
- Clare David as WPC Johnson
- Gavin Duff as PC Drew
- Adam Armstrong as Michael
- Nick Fletcher as Luke Creswell
- Danny Cunningham as Liam
- Terrence Hardiman as Mr Creswell
- Brenda Cavendish as Mrs Creswell
- Cinnamon Bone as Katy Creswell
- Lee Whitlock as Bevis Loveday
- Arbel Jones as Nick's Mother
- Sam Curtis as Gary
- Andrew Francis as Mr Phillips
- Lee Halliday as Mrs Phillips
- Jo Gazzano as Dave
- Ben Kent & Scott Wintrob as St Joe's Boys
- Caroline Harris as Rose
- Anthony Bailey as Den
- Peter Copley as Vicar
- Terence Booth as PC Vic
- Farimang Singateh as PC Nick

== Episodes ==
No.	Episode	Writer	Director	Original airdate
1	Episode One	Alison Fisher	Albert Barber	5 January 1993
After an asteroid is forecast to hit the planet at 3.20pm, it is blamed for a series of malfunctions that occur. Fran and Maria attempt to pair Natasha up with Mr. Brisley.
2	Episode Two	Alison Fisher	Albert Barber	8 January 1993
Barry ends up being chased round the school. Ray's new girlfriend impresses his friends. Techno and Spanner fall out. Natasha's diary is stolen by Fran and Maria.
3	Episode Three	Alison Fisher	Albert Barber	12 January 1993
Mr. Robson is pressurised to let the girls to play football. Things written in Natasha's diary are posted on the notice board.
4	Episode Four	Alison Fisher	Albert Barber	15 January 1993
Ray gambles the money raised so far to buy a camcorder on Grange Hill winning a five-a-side match against St. Joseph's so that they can get it quicker.
5	Episode Five	Diane Whitley	Richard Kelly	19 January 1993
Maria grows closer to Richard over a game of badminton. Mick and Grimbo help an aging Polish lady when they have to do some community work.
6	Episode Six	Diane Whitley	Richard Kelly	22 January 1993
Mary feels like a pariah after Julie finds out that she is a traveller.
7	Episode Seven	Chris Ellis	Richard Kelly	26 January 1993
After Mrs. Monroe cancels a lucrative advert film shoot at the school, Ray gets Justine to telephone to reinstate it. The footballers auditioning aren't what the producer expected though.
8	Episode Eight	Chris Ellis	Richard Kelly	29 January 1993
The camcorder is finally bought. Mr. Robson agrees to coach the girls football team. Maria manages to get Richard agree to take her to a new nightclub.
9	Episode Nine	Chris Ellis	Albert Barber	2 February 1993
Ray videos his brother's engagement party using the camcorder and it turns out to be an eventful night.
10	Episode Ten	Chris Ellis	Nigel Douglas	5 February 1993
The Polish lady discovers it was Frank and Graham, who stole the locket. She goes to Mrs Keele and tells them that they were the last in the room. Mrs Keele angrily sends them to her office. Graham admits to stealing it, and Frank and Graham are permanently excluded. Robyn meets Mary's father, whilst paying a visit to the traveller's home.
11	Episode Eleven	David Angus	Nigel Douglas	9 February 1993
Natalie discovers Fran's photo and she gives it to Natasha who pretends to know him. Fran's cousin then shows up.
12	Episode Twelve	David Angus	Nigel Douglas	12 February 1993
The football match between the girls and boys takes place. Robyn disappears on her birthday.
13	Episode Thirteen	Kevin Hood	Nigel Douglas	16 February 1993
The police start a search for Robyn including the travellers' camp. Mr. Brisley gives Justine a lesson in etiquette.
14	Episode Fourteen	Kevin Hood	Albert Barber	19 February 1993
Robyn's disappearance is finally solved. There are hostilities between Fran and Maria. Ray ends up accidentally showing the incriminating engagement party video to his brother's fiancée, Ruth.
15	Episode Fifteen	Kevin Hood	Albert Barber	23 February 1993
Justine attempts to forget about Liam as she spends the weekend at Luke's house in the country. Ruth has left leaving Kenny heartbroken.
16	Episode Sixteen	Kevin Hood	Albert Barber	26 February 1993
After some video equipment is stolen from the Media Room, Mick and Barry are blamed. The identity of the person who has been posting pages from Natasha's diary is finally found out.
17	Episode Seventeen	Sarah Daniels	Richard Kelly	2 March 1993
An old friend of Kenny's shows up. Nick ends up admitting the truth to Natasha.
18	Episode Eighteen	Sarah Daniels	Richard Kelly	5 March 1993
Ruth wants a church wedding. Lauren is blamed once again for Dudley's joke on Mr. Parrott. Justine and Ray find out that Mr. Brisley is gay
19	Episode Nineteen	Sarah Daniels	Richard Kelly	9 March 1993
Mr. Brisley admits the truth about his sexuality but ends up getting support in an unexpected way. Jacko informs his friends that his mother has been admitted to a mental institution.
20	Episode Twenty	Sarah Daniels	Richard Kelly	12 March 1993
Kenny and Ruth's wedding day arrives. Bevis and Mrs. Mason help the police with their inquiries.

== DVD release ==
The sixteenth series of Grange Hill has never been released on DVD as of 2024.
