= Grange Hill series 15 =

Grange Hill
- Season 15
- No. of episodes: 20

Release
- Original network: BBC One
- Original release: 7 January – 13 March 1992

Season chronology
- ← Previous; Series 14 Next → Series 16

The fifteenth series of the British television drama series Grange Hill began broadcasting on 7 January 1992, before ending on 13 March 1992 on BBC One. The series follows the lives of the staff and Students of the eponymous school, an inner-city London comprehensive school. It consists of twenty episodes.

== Cast ==
=== Students ===
- Rachel Victoria Roberts as Justine Dean
- Sonya Kearns as Chrissy Mainwaring
- Paul Parris as Matthew Pearson
- Julie Buckfield as Natalie Stevens
- Kelly George as Ray Haynes
- Luisa Bradshaw-White as Maria Watts
- Desmond Askew as Richard
- Rebekah Joy Gilgan as Fran Williams
- Clare Buckfield as Natasha Stevens
- David Crane as Barry Timpson
- Joseph Kpobie as Mick Daniels
- Jamie Golding as Graham "Grimbo" Pipe
- Christopher McGown as Frank Buttering
- Jamie Lehane as Russell "Jacko" Morgan
- Natalie Poyser as Becky Stevens
- Margo Selby as Julie Corrigan
- Ian Steele as Brian Shaw
- Alice Dawnay as Alice Rowe
- Nina Fry as Robyn Stone
- Alan Cave as Dennis "Techno" Morris
- Melanie Joseph as Lauren Phillips
- Zander Ward as Andy "Spanner" Walker
- Helen Meagher as Diane Richmond

=== Teachers ===
- Nicholas Donnelly as Mr Craig McKenzie
- George A. Cooper as Mr Eric Griffiths
- Stuart Organ as Mr Peter Robson
- Lee Cornes as Mr Jeff Hankin
- Jenny Howe as Mrs Angela Keele
- Paul Bigley as Mr Dave Greenman
- Anna Quayle as Mrs Monroe
- Flip Webster as Mrs Mason
- Marita Black as Ms Patti Janowitz

=== Others ===
- Ian Congdon-Lee as Ted Fisk
- James Duke as Man in Carpark
- Marsha Millar as Woman in Carpark
- Mark De Couteau as Stewart
- Ricky Wald as Jake
- Danny Cunningham as Liam
- Sean Carnegie as Lee
- Chris Jarman and John Juniper as Gang Leaders
- Janet Armsden as Angry Mother
- Rachel James as Woman in Carpark
- Eliza Hunt as Mrs Mainwaring
- Janet Allen as Mrs Stevens
- Denzil Kilvington as Kenny Haynes
- Byron Spiers as Liam's Mate
- David Sweeney as Alan
- Ramsay Gilderdale and Lisa Bowerman as Photographers
- Lesley Clare O'Neill as Sports Shop Assistant
- Jamie Roberts as Mr Lean
- Lee Dolan as Taxi Driver
- Edward Lyon as Mr Pollard
- Maria Warner as Nurse
- Samantha Best as Emma
- Rick Stone as Tony
- Joan Walker as WPC
- Christian Solari as Policeman
- Emma Shaw as Nun
- Gary Kielty and David Bamford as Liam's Mates
- Gal Boon as Youth
- Merelina Kendall as Travel Writer
- Stuart Cox as Jack English
- Levi Tafari as Special Guest Poet
- Debbie Chadwick as Lovebyte
- Chloe Ansell and Kamala Sutton as Lovebyte's Friends
- Jeremy Brown as Policeman
- Janet Lees Price as Miss Percival
- Fenton Gray as Reporter
- Tina Marian as H.E Teacher
- Evelyn Duah, Sharon Duncan-Brewster and Maxine Lyseight as Girls In Cafe
- Bill Moody as Baker
- Simon Embleton as Baker's Assistant
- Martin Sadler as Mr Walters
- Dean Richard and Roy Agyemang as Eagles
- Paul Raffield and Alan Cooke as Workmen
- Denzil Kilvington as Kenny Haynes
- Marc Warren as Thomas Rankin
- Robert Hands as Piers Coveney
- Nick Fletcher as Luke Cresswell
- Bill Dod as Football Commentator
- Patricia Martinelli as Marti Brunori
- Oliver Godfrey as Radio Reporter
- David Roth as Man In Car
- Pat O'Toole as Woman In Street
- Rebecca Reade as Girl

== Episodes ==
No.	Episode	Writer	Director	Original airdate
1	Episode One	Chris Ellis	Richard Kelly	7 January 1992
It's love at first sight for Ray when a new American teacher starts, Jacko and his mates start cleaning car windscreens, and Natalie is horrible to everyone.
2	Episode Two	Chris Ellis	Richard Kelly	10 January 1992
Ms. Janowitz suggests the idea of a school newspaper, and Nat continues exhibit a changeable personae until it becomes evident that she is just one of a pair of twins.
3	Episode Three	Chris Ellis	Richard Kelly	14 January 1992
The windscreen washers accidentally target Mr. Hargreaves's car. He tells Mr. Robson that Students must stay in at lunchtime, and Ray overhears and circulates a bulletin with the news.
4	Episode Four	Chris Ellis	Richard Kelly	17 January 1992
Trainers are banned at school after an expensive pair are stolen. The 5th formers debate "the Individual" versus "the group".
5	Episode Five	Sarah Daniels	Albert Barber	21 January 1992
Maria and Richard make fake American trainers, Spanner and Techno use the computer to produce the lines they are given to do, and unauthorised photographers appear in the playground.
6	Episode Six	Sarah Daniels	Albert Barber	24 January 1992
At the prompting of the Students, Mrs. Monroe teaches about disorders of the foot, and using the knowledge the Students give plausible excuses for trainers to be worn. Justine tapes a revealing interview with Mr. Hargreaves and Alice and Becky find a secret garden.
7	Episode Seven	Sarah Daniels	Albert Barber	28 January 1992
While Chrissy goes into an early labour, almost giving birth in the school loos, Ted seems intent on creating a new life for himself in Southampton.
8	Episode Eight	Sarah Daniels	Albert Barber	31 January 1992
Mr. Hargreaves isn't pleased when the newspaper misquotes him as lifting the trainer ban. The piece about cigarettes being sold to first formers provokes violent revenge against Justine.
9	Episode Nine	Alison Fisher	Richard Kelly	4 February 1992
Mrs. Keele, Grange Hill's new headmistress, starts. Ted finally goes to see Chrissy and their baby. Jacko sells flowers from the garden to Liam who gives them to Justine.
10	Episode Ten	Alison Fisher	Richard Kelly	7 February 1992
The clashes between Natasha and Natalie, and the violence in the peace garden finally all get too much for Becky. The feud with St Joseph's School gathers momentum.
11	Episode Eleven	Chris Ellis	Richard Kelly	11 February 1992
Writers' Week causes a bit of a stir, Techno finds out that "LoveByte" isn't quite the girl he was expecting, and without warning, Ray kisses Ms. Janowitz, but Natasha is spying on them.
12	Episode Twelve	Chris Ellis	Richard Kelly	14 February 1992
Natasha "congratulates" Ray and Ms. Janowitz in front of the whole class as if they in a relationship, causing Ray to get into a lot more trouble over the unwanted kiss. Justine plays a trick on the Cigarette Gang, and there's a massive confrontation between St. Joseph's and Grange Hill.
13	Episode Thirteen	Kevin Hood	Vivienne Cozens	18 February 1992
A local newspaper reporter steals Justine's unpublished account of the confrontation with St. Joseph's, and Mrs. Keele issues an ultimatum to the school.
14	Episode Fourteen	Kevin Hood	Vivienne Cozens	21 February 1992
After Justine intercepts a postcard for Ted a few home truths are revealed. Ted moves away to Southampton, alone. Diane finds a fox's paw print in the garden. Liam has a confrontation with a rival gang.
15	Episode Fifteen	Kevin Hood	Vivienne Cozens	25 February 1992
Staff and Students unite to stop the sale of the Peace Garden land.
16	Episode Sixteen	Kevin Hood	Vivienne Cozens	28 February 1992
Ray and the others try to find Liam to stop him joining in the Eagles and Hawks gang fight, but they find he's had an accident en route, and is lying dead in the road.
17	Episode Seventeen	Barry Purchese	Nigel Douglas	3 March 1992
Public schoolboys visit Grange Hill, Year Seven find out how environmentally friendly the school is, or rather isn't, and Justine makes a surprise return.
18	Episode Eighteen	Barry Purchese	Nigel Douglas	6 March 1992
The visiting public schoolboys find that the girls at Grange Hill are a little more than they can handle. Richard finally gets time alone with Natasha.
19	Episode Nineteen	Margaret Simpson	Nigel Douglas	10 March 1992
Richard organizes a collection for Ms. Janowitz, and Chrissy brings her baby to school.
20	Episode Twenty	Margaret Simpson	Nigel Douglas	13 March 1992
A fashion show and baseball match bring the school year to a close. Ray's jacket becomes Ms. Janowitz's leaving present, and the Cigarette Gang get expelled.

== DVD release ==
The fifteenth series of Grange Hill has never been released on DVD as of 2014.
