= Emma Kearney =

Emma Kearney may refer to:

- Emma Kearney (actress) (born 1981), Irish actress
- Emma Kearney (footballer) (born 1989), Australian cricketer and footballer
