= Gilthorpe =

Gilthorpe is an English surname. Notable people with the surname include:

- Anna Gilthorpe (born 1984), British actress
- Emma Gilthorpe (fl. 2024), British businesswoman
