= Dodger, Bonzo and the Rest =

- Created by: JJ Williams
- Starring: Lee Ross; Sophy McCallum; Jodie Gordon; Mark Fletcher; Jenny Jay
- Opening theme: "Our House" by Madness (performed by cast)
- Country of origin: United Kingdom
- No. of episodes: 13

Production
- Running time: 30 minutes/60 minutes
- Production company: Thames Television

Original release
- Network: ITV (CITV)
- Release: 18 February 1985 – 22 December 1986

Dodger, Bonzo and the Rest is a television drama series which centred on the lives of Michael "Dodger" Dolan and his sister, Carol (Bonzo), who were part of a large foster family in London. It was aired in the early evenings on the ITV programming block, Children's ITV. There were two series of six episodes between 1985 and 1986 plus a Christmas Special which aired on 22 December 1986. The Christmas Special would be the final episode of the series.

It starred Lee Ross as Dodger, and Sophy McCallum as his sister Bonzo. Jodie Gordon took over the part of Bonzo for the second series after McCallum declined to return, having not enjoyed her experience on the show.

== Origin ==
The series was written by JJ Williams and originated as an episode of the anthology series Dramarama, which featured a different screenplay each week. Its airing on the Dramarama series gained much popularity and it was commissioned a full series.

The theme song was the Madness song "Our House". The version of the song used on the show was performed by the young cast members. Another song heard in one of the episodes of the series was the Rod Stewart song "Sailing". This was also performed by the cast members at the closing credits of one of the early episodes as the characters sailed along the River Thames in London.

The series has never been released on DVD.

== Final episode ==
The final episode was the 1986 Christmas Special. It follows Dodger working at a department store and trying hard to rake up some spending money, but while he is happy working in the packing section, his dreams of becoming a valued member of staff are stifled when the new manager Mr. French drags Dodger to Santa's Grotto to replace an elf. Dodger is angered but is quickly convinced when he is told that his wages will be increased.

Meanwhile, Lisa is desperate to see her mother for Christmas, but Ronnie has to try to persuade her that seeing her mother again may not be the best thing for her.

Sharon is victim to her abusive boyfriend Barry and Elaine tries to convince her to give her baby son Darren a better life.
