= Anna Gilthorpe =

Anna Gilthorpe (born 4 February 1984) is an English actress from Newcastle upon Tyne best known for playing Gemma Collinge, who "wants to be famous and hounded by the world’s press by the time she turns 21", in the BBC Three sitcom The Gemma Factor. She is on screen alongside Claire King, Angus Barnett, Ross Adams and Gwyneth Powell in the sitcom, which is written by Tony Pitts.

Gilthorpe grew up in Gosforth, Newcastle upon Tyne, and went to Newcastle upon Tyne Church High School. She joined the National Youth Music Theatre and, after leaving school, studied musical theatre at the Royal Academy of Music. She made appearances at the Theatre Royal, Newcastle and Pimlico Opera, and in a production of Mack & Mabel and an episode of Holby City, before being offered the leading role of Gemma in The Gemma Factor. She has also appeared in Doctors and Holby City.
