= Johnny Mowlem =

British racing driver (born 1969)

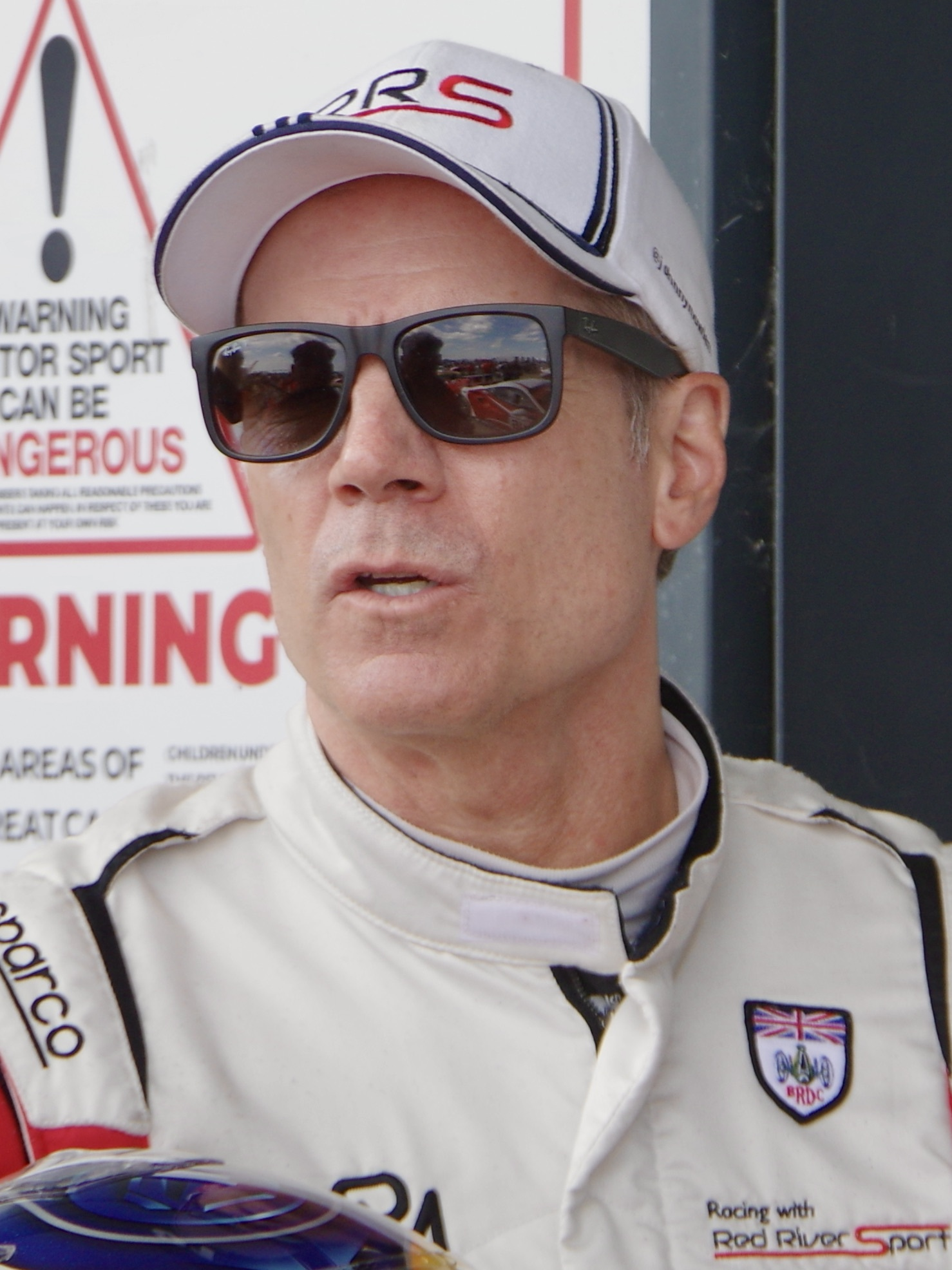
- Mowlem in 2025
- Nationality: (United Kingdom) British
- Born: John Philip Mowlem; 12 February 1969 (age 57) London, England
- Categorisation: FIA Platinum (until 2015); FIA Gold (2016–2020); FIA Silver (2021–)

24 Hours of Le Mans career
- Years: 2000, 2001, 2003, 2006–2008, 2011, 2013, 2014, 2020
- Teams: Skea Racing International, Ecurie Ecosse, RML, Risi Competizione, Creation Autosportif, Lotus Jetalliance, HVM Status GP. RAM Racing. AF Corse Ferrari
- Best finish: 2nd GT Class 2000

John Philip Mowlem (born 12 February 1969) is a professional British racing driver. During his career, Mowlem was ranked amongst the best sports car/GT drivers in the world, having competed in every class of world championship sports car racing.

Mowlem is the 2013 European Le Mans Series GT champion, having previously won the British Porsche Cup championship in 1996 and 1997. He has class victories in both the 24 Hours of Daytona and the 12 Hours of Sebring, and has earned podiums at virtually all of the world's major sports car races, including the Le Mans 24 hours and the 1000 km Nürburgring. He has also achieved overall podium finishes at the Daytona 24 hours as well as at Petit Le Mans.

Mowlem began his career in single seaters racing up to Formula 3 level and got his big break when he was chosen personally by triple Formula One World Champion Jackie Stewart to join his "staircase of "talent" team in the junior single seater formula, alongside drivers of the calibre of Dario Franchitti, Allan McNish and Gil de Ferran. He switched to sportscars in 1996, winning the Class 1 championship of the British Porsche Cup and then gained international recognition the following year when he won all 17 races of the British Porsche Cup to become British champion. This launched his professional career in World Sportscars. Later in his career, he gained further international attention for his work as a driver of the hybrid-powered Ginetta Zytek prototype racer in the ALMS in 2008 and 2009. In 2010, Mowlem was a Lotus Racing factory driver, driving the American Le Mans Series (ALMS) and in the International GT Open Series for sports cars in Europe. His latest driving championship came in the European Le Mans Series in 2013. Mowlem raced in the ALMS series every year that sanctioning body held races. Mowlem also operates his own driving academy, working with both corporate clients and drivers wishing for a career in racing.

Mowlem's career has been followed for over the last decade in his home country through a series of documentary television programs that air on the Television network Sky Sports Television.

== Personal life ==
Mowlem, who was born in London, was raised in Mallorca, Spain from the age of one until he was seventeen years old. He attended Leeds University where he achieved a joint Honors BA degree in Spanish and Economics. Divorced in 2021, he was married to actress Fiona McLean for 24 years and has two children; a son named Reece and a daughter, Sereina.

Mowlem has a tremendous fitness ethic. He took part in the London Marathon, completing the distance, as part of a charity fundraiser by the British Racing Drivers Club in 2010. The BRDC effort raised eighty thousand pounds. Mowlem's effort was all the more remarkable as his training was limited by a torn Achilles tendon suffered three months earlier. Mowlem was hurt while playing soccer. He ran the London Marathon again in 2011 lowering his personal best to the 3hr 45m mark.

Mowlem was inducted into the University of Leeds Sporting Hall of Fame in October 2018.

== Early career ==
Mowlem started his racing career in 1990, at age 19, when he competed in Formula Ford 1600 at Brands Hatch. He raced for Jackie Stewart's Staircase of Talent team in the British Formula Vauxhall Lotus class before moving up to the British Formula 3 championship in 1995, winning four times.

Mowlem then switched to sports cars in 1996, racing in the Porsche Carrera Cup Great Britain in 1996 and 1997, winning the class 1 championship in 1996 and then generating his first major media attention in 1997 by winning all 17 races to become British champion for the second time. He earned the pole position for 14 of the 17 events. Winning this championship by remaining un-defeated throughout an entire season earned him international recognition and the Gregor Grant Award for outstanding achievement in motorsport at the International Autosport Awards.

== International career ==
In the 1999 season, Mowlem finished second in the GT3 class in the Rolex 24 at Daytona in 1999. That same year, Mowlem and co-driver David Murry competed in the GT class in the ALMS. They finished first in the GT class at Laguna Seca Raceway, setting the fastest GT lap of the race.

The 2000 season included second place class finishes in the 12 Hours of Sebring and the 24 Hours of Le Mans. By then Mowlem was a full-time competitor in the North American-based ALMS while living in the UK. In 2001, Mowlem continued his ALMS career. He drove with a number of co-drivers in the GT and GT1 class. At Sebring, Mowlem was teamed with Petersen Motorsports but the team withdrew the car following the death of co-driver Bob Wollek following a non-racing incident in the Sebring area. Mowlem posted the fastest lap by a GT1 car during the Le Mans race.

Mowlem partnered with Randy Pobst to finish second in the GT class at Le Mans in 2002. He partnered with international stars Tony Stewart and Jan Lammers to drive a factory Crawford race car in the Daytona Prototype category at Daytona. An engine failure stopped the trio after 15 hours.

Mowlem was part of another team that withdrew from competition at Sebring in 2008. The Corsa Motorsports Ferrari team withdrew due to concerns over the tires the team was using.

=== Major victories and championships ===
In 2003, Mowlem continued to compete in the United States, earning a second place in GT and second overall at the Daytona 24 Hours and Sebring 12 Hours, as well as victory at the ALMS round held at Road America.

Mowlem won the GT class and again finished second overall at Daytona in 2004, driving with Robin Liddell, Mike Fitzgerald and Jay and Joe Policastro.

Mowlem finished third in the ALMS GT1 drivers' championship in 2004 and 2005. He also competed in several Rolex Sports Car Series events in the United States during those seasons and, including trips for testing sessions, crossed the Atlantic Ocean about 100 times during those two years.

Mowlem won the 2005 UK Reading Sports Personality of the Year, an honour reserved for the top sports performers in his region. Mowlem showed his adaptability during the 2006 season, racing an Aston Martin DBRS9 for Autosport Design Racing in the SPEED World Challenge GT series as well as competing in the International GT Open series in a Porsche and in two different classes in the ALMS. The latter led to one of the highlights of his career. Racing in the ALMS, Mowlem won the GT2 class at Mosport in a Ferrari, and then drove for the factory Zytek team in the LMP1 class in the last two races of the season. Teamed with former Formula One driver Stefan Johansson and Japanese Haruki Kurosawa, Mowlem finished second overall in the Petit Le Mans at Road Atlanta and nearly won the season finale from pole position, again with Johansson, at the newly renamed Mazda Raceway Laguna Seca.

In 2007, Mowlem continued his strong association with Ferrari, racing a 430 in the GT2 class for the Pirelli factory GPC Ferrari team in the Le Mans Series as well as the International GT Open championship. He also drove for the Risi Competizione Ferrari team as their third driver alongside Mika Salo and Jaime Melo in the longer endurance races. This driver combination brought Ferrari a class victory in the 2007 12 Hours of Sebring, with the closest margin of victory in the history of the championship, two-tenths of a second. That victory margin added to Mowlem's closest finish in Daytona 24 Hours history in 2004, where he finished 6.7 seconds ahead of Mike Rockenfeller after 24 hours of racing. At Le Mans in 2007, Salo/Melo/Mowlem were leading their class by three laps when Melo had an accident, spinning on an oil slick seventeen hours in the event.

Mowlem joined Corsa Motorsports for the 2008 ALMS season, racing a Ferrari in the GT2 class. Late in the season, the team started a new venture in conjunction with Zytek. Mowlem's continuing association with the Zytek team resulted in a joint effort to race a hybrid-powered car in the P1 class in ALMS. The Ginetta-Zytek GZ09HS hybrid car debuted in 2009. The car, was powered by a hybrid power plant. It combined an internal combustion engine and an electric motor. The effort made history when Mowlem qualified the car third and finished third in the P1 class in a race at Lime Rock Park. Mowlem did much of the test driving during the extensive development process conducted by Zytek.

In 2010, the hybrid program was put on hold but Mowlem has continued his career in ALMS securing drives in the LMPC at Long Beach and Laguna Seca and at Road America and Mosport in a LMP1 Lola driving for AutoCon. Mowlem put the PR1 Mathiasen Motorsports car on the LMP Challenge class pole with a new track record lap averaging 103.558 mph. This LMPC track record in the American Le Mans Series still stands today.[3]

Mowlem signed with Lotus in 2011 to drive race cars for the famed car maker. He is also the primary test driver for the company's development program. He said, "This is the opportunity of a lifetime. Many of the great drivers in racing history have been associated with Lotus at one time or another. Now I'm one of them." He won for Lotus the Vallelunga 6 hours Silver Cup for GT4 machinery, setting pole position and fastest lap, and also finished third in the 2011 Dubai 24 hours alongside Greg and Leo Mansell and Stefano D'Aste. He also spearheaded the Le Mans 24 Lotus factory effort alongside Rossiter and Hirschi, starting the race and also bringing the Lotus Evora GTE car home in its first major endurance event in seventh place in the GT class.

For 2012, Mowlem signed to drive selected long distance races racing in the LMP1 premier category for Dyson Racing in the American Le Mans Series. The Dyson agreement was reached with permission from Lotus.

Mowlem won the European Le Mans Series GTE driving championship in 2013. Driving a Ferrari 458 GTE for Britain-based RAM Racing, Mowlem and co-driver Matt Griffin won their class in three races and did not finish worse than second in class all season long.

Mowlem also raced on the US side of the Atlantic in 2013. He joined the Dyson Racing LMP1 effort, driving the Thetford/RACER Lola Mazda at Virginia International Raceway, co-driving with Guy Smith. Mowlem started the race and gave the car to Smith with the lead. Smith also led the race before finishing second overall due to an unfortunate strategy call.

At the end of the 2013 season, Mowlem was awarded the Richard Burns Memorial Trophy during the Reading Sports Personality Awards in England. The Burns Trophy is the highest accolade the Reading event issues each year.

Mowlem raced frequently on two continents in 2014. He raced a Ferrari for RAM Racing in defense of his 2013 European Le Mans GT championship and raced in both the United States-based United Sportscar Championship series and in the European Le Mans Series in the GT2 category.

The globe trotting continued in 2015. Mowlem raced in the United Sportscar Championship/North American Endurance Championship in the United States for BAR1 Motorsports in the Prototype Challenge category, driving an Oreca. Mowlem qualified on the class pole for the Rolex 24 at Daytona and finished second. He qualified on the front row for the Petit Le Mans race at Road Atlanta before finishing third in the race. Mowlem also competed in a 12-hour race at Abu Dhabi in a Ferrari 458 GT3.

Mowlem repeated his pole-grabbing performance at Daytona when he captured the Prototype Challenge class pole position in advance of the 2016 Rolex 24 at Daytona. During a driving rain storm, Mowlem posted the quickest qualifying time overall but race administrators elected to start the field according to category, which put the more powerful Daytona Prototype cars at the front of the field. Mowlem finished third in class in the race. Will also compete in a Ferrari 458 GT3 for the factory-supported FF Corse in the European Le Mans GT3 Cup Championship.

As of February 2016, Mowlem's all-time racing record includes 223 races and 40 wins. He has finished second 44 times and third 41 times. Mowlem has captured 35 poles and posted 35 fastest laps during race action. In European Le Mans Series competition, Mowlem has competed in 73 races, winning eight times, qualifying on the pole seven times and posting the fastest lap in the race seven times. He has qualified in the top three 32 times and finished on the class or overall podium 32 times.

Mowlem became a well-known name in Britcar, after racing with FF Corse in Ferraris with Welsh driver Bonamy Grimes. In 2016, he claimed pole positions in his class at every venue he attended. In 2017, instead of chosen entries, Grimes and Mowlem entered for the whole of the season, and at the end of the season, they finished fourth overall in the endurance category and won the class 2 trophy. In 2018, Mowlem only attended one round of the season with Ivor Dunbar in a 488 GT3, winning both races in his category.

== Racing record ==
=== Complete 24 Hours of Le Mans results ===
Year	Team	Co-Drivers	Car	Class	Laps	Pos.	Class Pos.
2000	(Australia) Skea Racing International	(United States) David Murry (Germany) Sascha Maassen	Porsche 911 GT3-R	GT	304	17th	2nd
2001	(United Kingdom) Ecurie Ecosse (United Kingdom) Ray Mallock Ltd.	(United Kingdom) Ian McKellar (Belgium) Bruno Lambert	Saleen S7-R	GTS	175	DNF	DNF
2003	(United States) Risi Competizione	(United States) Shane Lewis (United States) Butch Leitzinger	Ferrari 360 Modena GTC	GT	138	DNF	DNF
2006	(United States) ACEMCO Motorsports	(United States) Terry Borcheller (Brazil) Christian Fittipaldi	Saleen S7-R	GT1	337	11th	6th
2007	(United States) Risi Competizione	(Finland) Mika Salo (Brazil) Jaime Melo	Ferrari F430 GT2	GT2	223	DNF	DNF
2008	(United Kingdom) Creation Autosportif	(United Kingdom) Stuart Hall (Belgium) Marc Goossens	Creation CA07-AIM	LMP1	316	24th	11th
2011	(Austria) Lotus Jetalliance	(Switzerland) Jonathan Hirschi (United Kingdom) James Rossiter	Lotus Evora GTE	GTE; Pro	295	22nd	7th
2013	(Canada) HVM Status GP	(Switzerland) Jonathan Hirschi (Canada) Tony Burgess	Lola B12/80-Judd	LMP2	144	DNF	DNF
2014	(United Kingdom) RAM	(United Kingdom) Archie Hamilton (United States) Mark Patterson	Ferrari 458 Italia GT2	GTE; Am	319	32nd	12th
2020	(United Kingdom) Red River Sport	(United Kingdom) Bonamy Grimes (United Kingdom) Charles Hollings	Ferrari 488 GTE Evo	GTE; Am	325	41st	15th

=== Johnny Mowlem at 12 Hours of Sebring ===
Year	Finish/Class Finish	Team	Co-Drivers	Car	Laps Completed
2016	33rd/PC 6th	BAR1 Motorsports	Marc Drumwright; Ryan Lewis; Don Yount	Oreca FLM09	228
2011	45th/LMPC 6th	Iconik Energy Drinks WRO	Olivier Lombard; Luca Moro	Oreca FLM09	203
2007	12th/GT2 winners	Risi Competizione	Mike Salo; Jaime Melo	Ferrari F430 GT	330
2005	8th/GT1 4th	ACEMCO Motorsports	Terry Borcheller; Ralf Kelleners	Saleen S7R	318
2004	25th/GTS 3rd	ACEMCO Motorsports	Terry Borcheller; David Brabham	Saleen S7R	257
2003	11th/GT 2nd	White Lightning Racing	Niclas Jonsson; Craig Stanton	Porsche 911 GT3RSR	319
2002	38th/GT 12th	Harlow Motorsport	Terry Rymer; Mike Youles	Porsche 911 GT3R	144
2001	Withdrew	Petersen Motorsports	Bob Wollek Michael Petersen	Porsche 911 GT3-RS	
2000	11th/GT 2nd	Skea Racing International	David Murray	Porsche GT3R	308
1999	34th/GT 12th	Reiser Callas Rennsport	David Murry	Porsche 911 Carrera RSR	197

Races: 9
Average Finish: 24.111/ Class 5.333
Laps completed: 2,304
Average Laps Completed: 256

=== Johnny Mowlem at 24 Hours of Daytona ===
Year	Finish/Class Finish	Team	Co-Drivers	Car	Laps Completed
2017	30th/PC 2nd	BAR1 Motorsport	Tom Papadopoulos; Adam Merzon; Trent Hindman; David Cheng	ORECA FLM 09	616
2016	29th/PC 3rd	BAR1 Motorsport	Marc Drumwright; Tomy Drissi; Ricardo Vera; Brendan Gaughan	ORECA FLM 09	693
2015	53rd/PC 8th (Disqualified); Originally 2nd in class	BAR1 Motorsport	Brian Adler; Tomy Drissi; Tom Papadopoulos; Martin Plowman	ORECA FLM 09	713
2008	31st/GT 17th	Orbit Racing	Lance Willsey; Tom Papadopoulos; Mike Fitzgerald	Porsche GT3 Cup	589
2007	20th/GT 8th	Doncaster Racing	Dave Lacey; Greg Wilkins; Tom Papadopoulos; Lance Arnold	Porsche GT3 Cup	611
2006	18th/GT 7th	Peter Baron	Lance Arnold; Bryan Sellers; David Shep; Jan Seyffarth	Porsche GT3 Cup	663
2005	45th/GT 23rd	Ebimotors	Karl Wendlinger; Dieter Quester; Vincent Vosse	Porsche GT3 Cup	409
2004	2nd/GT winner	Orbit Racing	Mike Fitzgerald; Joe Policastro; Joe Policastro Jr; Robin Liddell	Porsche GT3 RS	523
2003	2nd/GT 2nd	Risi Competizione	Ralf Kelleners; Anthony Lazzaro	Ferrari 360 GT	686
2002	46th/SR 11th	Crawford Racing	Jan Lammers; Tony Stewart	Judd Crawford	346
2000	39th/GTU 21st	Skea Racing International	David Murry; Hawkins; Skea	Porsche 966 GT3R	400
1999	9th/GT3 2nd	Reiser/Callas Rennsport	David Murry; Joel Reiser; Grady Willingham	Porsche 911 Carrera RSR	11

=== Complete FIA World Endurance Championship results ===
Year	Entrant	Class	Car	Engine	1	2	3	4	5	6	7	8	Rank	Points
2019–20	Red River Sport	LMGTE Am	Ferrari 488 GTE Evo	Ferrari F154CB 3.9 L Turbo V8	SIL; 8	FUJ; 10	SHA; 11	BHR; 8	COA; 8	SPA; 9	LMS; 9	BHR	20th	24

^{*} Season still in progress.

Awards and achievements
Preceded by Dale Earnhardt; Jabby Crombac	Gregor Grant Award – Autosport Awards; 1997	Succeeded by Lord March; Klaus Ludwig; Alex Zanardi
