= Lee Whitlock =

British television and film actor (1968–2023)

- Born: 17 April 1968; Hammersmith, London, England
- Died: 17 February 2023 (aged 54)
- Occupation: Actor
- Relatives: Emma Whitlock (sister)

Lee Whitlock (17 April 1968 – 17 February 2023) was a British television and film actor. His roles in film and TV included Shine on Harvey Moon (1982), Two of Us (1987), Casualty (1991), Grange Hill (1993), Sweeney Todd: The Demon Barber of Fleet Street, London's Burning, and The Bill (all 2007) and Ill Manors (2012).

== Career ==
At age 12, Whitlock gave his debut in the British television series The Gentle Touch in 1980. In 1982 he starred in a main role as Stanley Moon, the son of Harvey Moon, for five seasons and 41 episodes of ITV's Shine on Harvey Moon. In 1982, he appeared as Falstaff's page Robin in The Merry Wives of Windsor.

In 1987, he had a short appearance in the British film Wish You Were Here by David Leland, and he became further notable in the 1987 television drama Two of Us, about a gay relationship between two schoolboys. The following year he starred alongside Chris Gascoyne in Central Television's series for schools, Starting Out.

In 1989, Whitlock played his most notable role, that of Sydney Chaplin, the elder half-brother of Charlie Chaplin, in the television movie Young Charlie Chaplin by Bazz Taylor. Further well-known series in which he had roles were Split Ends, EastEnders, Harry Enfield's Television Programme, Lovejoy, Soldier Soldier, Boon, Grange Hill, A Touch of Frost, The Detectives, Silent Witness, McCallum, Casualty, London's Burning and The Bill. In 2007, he played a policeman in Sweeney Todd: The Demon Barber of Fleet Street which starred Johnny Depp and Helena Bonham Carter. In 1992, Whitlock also starred in the W.I.Z. directed short film for Flowered Up's song "Weekender", playing the role of Little Joe. In 1993, he appeared as Ben Levis in four episodes of BBC children's drama series Grange Hill.

== Death ==
Whitlock died on 17 February 2023, aged 54.

== Filmography ==
| Year | Title | Role | Notes |
|---|---|---|---|
| 1980 | The Gentle Touch | Peter Reynolds | Series 2 episode 9: "Shame" |
| 1980 | Sherlock Holmes and Doctor Watson | Christopher Wharton | Series 1 episode 2: "The Case of the Luckless Gambler" |
| 1981 | Cribb | Bobby | Series 2 episode 2: "The Last Trumpet" |
| 1982 | Legacy of Murder | Wayne | 3 episodes |
| 1982 | Spooner's Patch | Boy | Series 3 episode 5: "Suffer the Little Children" |
| 1982 | The Merry Wives of Windsor | Robin | Television film |
| 1982–1995 | Shine on Harvey Moon | Stanley Moon | 41 episodes |
| 1983 | Tears Before Bedtime | Harold | Series 1 episode 2: "The Second Honeymoon" |
| 1983 | Dramarama | Dad | Series 1 episode 1: "Mighty Mum and the Petnappers" |
| 1983 | Behind the Bike Sheds | | 6 episodes |
| 1984 | Comrade Dad | Bob Dudgeon | Pilot episode |
| 1985–1986 | Hold the Back Page | Charlie Wordsworth | 10 episodes |
| 1986 | C.A.T.S. Eyes | Duane | Series 2 episode 5: "Rough Trip" |
| 1986 | The Best Years of Your Life | Robert Clark | Television film |
| 1986–1989 | Starting Out | Steve Williams | 2 episodes |
| 1987 | Wish You Were Here | Brian | |
| 1987 | Two of Us | Phil | Television film |
| 1988 | Me and My Girl | Charlie | Series 6 episode 5: "Only the Lonely" |
| 1989 | Young Charlie Chaplin | Sydney Chaplin | 6 episodes |
| 1989 | Split Ends | Lee | 6 episodes |
| 1990 | The Two of Us | Young man | Series 4 episode 6: "Fine Adjustments" |
| 1990 | Harry Enfield & Chums | Big Brother | 3 episodes |
| 1990 | Play Dead | Chris Dack | Short film |
| 1991 | Lovejoy | Constable | Series 2 episode 5: "Who Dares, Sings" |
| 1991 | Soldier Soldier | Gunner Mills | 1 episode |
| 1991 | Under Suspicion | Ben | |
| 1991 | Boon | John Strong | Series 6 episode 4: "Cover Up" |
| 1991 | Casualty | Graham | Series 6 episode 3: "Dangerous Games" |
| 1992 | A Touch of Frost | Apprentice | 1 episode |
| 1992 | Weekender | | Short film |
| 1992–2010 | The Bill | Various characters | 10 episodes |
| 1993 | The Detectives | Young stablehand | 1 episode |
| 1993 | Grange Hill | Bevis Loveday | 4 episodes |
| 1993 | Get Back | Young man in store | 1 episode |
| 1993 | Great Performances | Spinner | Series 22 episode 6: "Pete Townshend's Psychoderelict" |
| 1994 | 99-1 | Blink | 1 episode |
| 1994 | Shopping | Pony | |
| 1994 | Scene | Gary | 1 episode |
| 1996 | Silent Witness | Stevo | Series 1; "Darkness Visible, parts 1 & 2" |
| 1997 | EastEnders | Border Agency Officer | Episode dated 1 December 1997 |
| 1998 | McCallum | Richie | Series 2 episode 5: "Beyond Good and Evil" |
| 1999 | Maisie Raine | Tony Baker | Series 2 episode 2: "European Forty Five" |
| 2000 | Command Approved | Fire party crew | |
| 2001 | London's Burning | Terry Bailey | 2 episodes |
| 2005 | Bloodlines | White van man | |
| 2006 | Ghostboat | Reeves | |
| 2006 | That Summer Day | Caretaker | |
| 2006 | Prime Suspect | Jeremy | Episode: "The Final Act" |
| 2007 | Cassandra's Dream | Mike | |
| 2007 | Sweeney Todd: The Demon Barber of Fleet Street | Policeman | |
| 2008 | He Kills Coppers | Sam | Television film |
| 2008 | Beyond the Rave | Terry Crocker | Video only |
| 2008 | Holby City | Terry Stroll | Series 10 episode 29: "The Softest Music" |
| 2008 | Love Me Still | Vince | |
| 2011 | Wild Bill | Boss | |
| 2012 | Comes a Bright Day | Ticket Tout | |
| 2012 | Ill Manors | Vince | |
| 2012 | The Sweeney | Whiting | |
| 2012 | Parade's End | Parry | 1 episode |
| 2012 | EastEnders | Rob Hedges | Episode dated 23 October 2012 |
| 2013 | Complicit | Coffee Shop Owner | |
| 2013 | Rock and Roll Fuck'n'Lovely | Ads | |
| 2013 | Jack the Giant Slayer | Small drunk | |
| 2013 | Casualty | Steve Johnstone | 1 episode |
| 2013 | Law & Order | Dean Carter | Series 7 episode 6: "Dependent" |
| 2016 | Stan Lee's Lucky Man | Reporter 1 | Series 1 episode 3: "Evil Eye" |
| 2017 | Rise of the Footsoldier 3: The Pat Tate Story | Man | |
| 2021 | Ferryman | Bridge Ferryman | |
| 2022 | D Is for Detroit | Spencer | |
| TBA | The Trade | Johnny | Pre production |

== Bibliography ==
- Holmstrom, John. The Moving Picture Boy: An International Encyclopaedia from 1895 to 1995. Norwich, Michael Russell, 1996, p. 371.
