= Jenny Jay =

British actress and singer (born . 1967)

- Born: Jennifer Bolton c. 1967 (age 58–59); Birmingham, England
- Other name: Jenka
- Education: Italia Conti Academy of Theatre Arts; Sylvia Young Theatre School
- Occupations: Actress and singer
- Website: jenniferbolton.co.uk

Jennifer Bolton (born c. 1967) also known as Jenny Jay, is a British actress and singer. She is best known for playing Carmen in the 1980s television series Bread. Other roles have included appearances in Alas Smith and Jones, Inspector Morse, and All Creatures Great and Small.

== Early life and education ==
Born as Jennifer Bolton in Birmingham, England, and also known as Jenny Jay, has been involved in the music business and performing since a very early age – entering talent contests at Butlins holiday camps and winning several holidays for the family.

Bolton's passion for singing and performing began at an early age; she won her first competition when she was five years old as well as appearing on Opportunity Knocks. At seven years of age, she sang at the London Hilton Cabaret Spot. Moving to London at this time made it possible for her to go to the prestigious Italia Conti Academy of Theatre Arts and later attend the Sylvia Young Theatre School.

== Career ==
During her teens, she appeared in two ITV dramas, Dodger, Bonzo and the Rest and two series of Behind the Bike Sheds. She also appeared on the Russell Harty Show performing an act with a ventriloquist doll of then Prime Minister Margaret Thatcher.

An appearance in the BBC gay-themed drama Two of Us led to musician Morrissey casting Bolton in the music video for his single "Dagenham Dave".

Many television roles followed, most prominently two seasons as Carmen in Carla Lane's Liverpool sitcom Bread. She has also appeared in such programmes as Behind the Bike Sheds, The Bill, KYTV, Alas Smith and Jones, All Creatures Great and Small, Inspector Morse and the 1980s children's drama series, Dodger, Bonzo and the Rest.

In 1996, Bolton appeared on the L!VE TV soap opera Canary Wharf playing the role of a make-up artist.

== Music ==
In 1987, Bolton featured alongside Paul McCartney, Boy George, Bananarama, Kim Wilde, Nik Kershaw and many others as part of the line up for Ferry Aid on the charity single "Let It Be" in aid of the Zeebrugge Herald of Free Enterprise disaster.

In 1989, she performed backing vocals during the Italian tour of soul group Imagination. She also worked with James Brown's backing band at a club in Georgia, US.

Over the years, Bolton has appeared at venues spanning the country from The Zap Club in Brighton to The Fubar in Scotland.

She was also part of hardcore music group Triple J, as well as having a solo career as Jenka, and also her real name, Jennifer Bolton.
