= The Gemma Factor =

BBC Three sitcom

- Genre: Sitcom
- Created by: Tony Pitts
- Written by: Tony Pitts
- Directed by: John Henderson
- Starring: Anna Gilthorpe; Gwyneth Powell; Ashley Taylor-Rhys; Hannah Kew; Tony Pitts; Michael Walter; Ross Adams; Claire King; Adam Gillen; Philip McGinley; Emma Kearney; Angus Barnett
- Country of origin: United Kingdom
- Original language: English
- No. of series: 1
- No. of episodes: 6

Production
- Production locations: Hebden Bridge and Heptonstall
- Running time: 30 minutes

Original release
- Network: BBC Three; BBC HD
- Release: 9 March – 6 April 2010

The Gemma Factor is a BBC Three sitcom starring Anna Gilthorpe, Claire King and Gwyneth Powell. The series premiered on Tuesday 9 March 2010, and has six episodes.

== Overview ==
The series is set in a town called Lumb in West Yorkshire, some scenes are set in Halifax and follows Gemma Collinge who "wants to be famous by the time she turns 21." It was filmed around Hebden Bridge and Heptonstall.
