= Two of Us (1987 film) =

- Written by: Leslie Stewart
- Directed by: Roger Tonge
- Starring: Jason Rush; Lee Whitlock
- Music by: Nick Russell-Pavier; David Chilton
- Country of origin: United Kingdom
- Original language: English

Production
- Running time: 75 minutes

Original release
- Release: 1987

Two of Us (also released as The Two of Us on home video) is a 1987 gay-themed BBC television film written by Leslie Stewart and directed by Roger Tonge. It was produced for the BBC Schools Scene series, and intended for young adults. It confronted the Thatcherite government's attempt to ban gay sex education in schools via the controversial (and since repealed) section 28 legislation. Given this backdrop, the BBC opted not to show it during the day and it was screened late at night, even though it was originally created for a school audience. It wasn't until February 1990 that the play was shown during the day, with a same sex kiss secretly reinserted without the BBC's knowledge. The 1990 broadcast of the drama is thought to be the first gay kiss shown on British television made for children.

== Plot ==
The film centres on the life of Phil, a fun loving student in his final year at British secondary school. He is currently going steady with girlfriend Sharon, whose best friend Vera (an early role for Kathy Burke) just happens to have the hots for his best mate Matthew. However, Matthew is gay, and dropped out of school the previous year as a means of escaping the abuse of the classroom, only for the discovery of his collection of soft-core gay porn to cause him problems at home as well. Matthew is an ardent swimmer – an opportunity for the film to immediately use and confront an obvious stereotype.

Phil is torn between the realisation that whilst he loves Sharon, he equally has feelings for Matthew. He tries to have it both ways, introducing the one to the other – prompting Vera to describe him as a "little worm" when Sharon runs off in distress. Tired of the complications of life at home, Phil and Matthew decide to elope to the coastal resort of Seaford on the Sussex coast. Sharon follows him, determined to regain her "fella".

The film has two endings. In the original 1987 release, Phil returns to Matthew at the beach, and they run together into the ocean. The film was re-released in 1988 with an ending where Phil appears to leave with Sharon, but Matthew decides that life must go on and that he is his own person.

== Cast ==
Actor	Role
Jason Rush	Matthew
Lee Whitlock	Phil
Jenny Jay	Sharon
Zoë Nathenson	Suzie
Kathy Burke	Vera
James McKenna	Teacher
Martha Constantinou	School Kids
Abbie Dabner	School Kids
Jimmy Demetriou	School Kids
Ivor Dore	School Kids
Kelda Holmes	School Kids
Adam Smith	School Kids
Judy Gridley	Phil's mother
John Judd	Matthew's father
Gordon Salkilld	Car Driver
Geoffrey Leesley	Policeman
