= Leslie Stewart (writer) =

British-based writer and director (born 1949)

- Born: Leslie George Gannagé-Stewart; 23 May 1949 (age 77)
- Origin: Benghazi, Libya
- Occupations: screenwriter, playwright, director

Leslie Stewart (born 23 May 1949, Benghazi, Libya) is a British-based film and TV screenwriter, playwright and director.

== Background ==
Born Leslie George Gannagé-Stewart, he co-wrote the song "Mistletoe and Wine", which earned Cliff Richard the 1988 Christmas number one. His television script writing work includes Monarch of the Glen, Holby City, Love Bytes, Down to Earth, Casualty, As If, Peak Practice, and the 1987 film, Two of Us, for the BBC's Scene series.

In 1976, Stewart co-wrote his first musical, Shoot Up at Elbow Creek. He also wrote The Little Match Girl, based on Hans Christian Andersen's short story, for Richmond's Orange Tree Theatre, which contained the song "Mistletoe and Wine." HTV assisted in the production of the play for television in 1986.

Having worked extensively in music, writing for, among others, the jazz-rock outfit Swegas, Consortium and Cliff Richard, and producing artists including Jeff Baker, Stewart continues to work as a lyricist, currently with the American blues musician, Johnny Mars.

Stewart is a member of the British Academy of Film and Television Arts (BAFTA), the Writers' Guild of Great Britain, the British Academy of Songwriters, Composers and Authors and PRS for Music (formerly the Performing Rights Society).

In October 2022, Stewart was featured alongside Roger Tonge in an interview for BBC One's Kids TV: The Surprising Story (airdate 26 October 2022). They discussed their film Two Of Us (1987), which was written for the BBC Two's Scenes series, intended for use in schools. Stewart and Tonge spoke about letters they received in response to their film and the newspaper headlines. As Thatcher's government was in power at the time of the release of Two Of Us, scenes from the film were removed and banned due to Thatcher's laws. These scenes were later restored.

== Works ==
=== Stage work ===
- Shoot up at Elbow Creek (Orange Tree Theatre, Richmond; Greenwich, London; etc.).
- The Little Matchgirl (with Keith Strachan & Jeremy Paul; The Orange Tree, Richmond; Contact, Manchester; Reykjavík Opera House; European and Russian tours etc.), which transposed Hans Christian Andersen's classic fairytale to the world of alcohol abuse and child-prostitution. A song from the show, ‘Mistletoe and Wine’ won an Ivor Novello Award, was the best-selling single of 1988 and the third best-selling single of the 1980s.
- The Soldier (Ware Arts Centre/Various)
- Contributed to the London Revue City Delights (with Keith Strachan; Oxford Playhouse)

=== Film for television ===
- Three Minute Heroes (Play for Today BBC 1)
- The Amazing Miss Stella Estelle (Play for Today BBC 1)
- Space Station: Milton Keynes (Screen Two, BBC)
- Wide Games (Scene, BBC 2)
- Good Neighbours (Scene, BBC 2)
- Janna, Where Are You? (Scene, BBC 2)
- Q.P.R. Askey Is Dead (Scene, BBC 2)
- That Green Stuff (Scene, BBC 2)
- Two of Us (Scene, BBC 2)
- The Little Match Girl (HTV/Picture Base, Emmy Nomination)
- Boogie Outlaws (mini-series, BBC 2)
- Love Bytes, an anthology series, Nominated for Most Outstanding Drama Series – Silver Logie Award 2005, produced by Shine and Fox TV.

=== Other television work ===
- Peak Practice (Carlton TV)
- Holby City (BBC TV)
- Down to Earth (BBC TV)
- Monarch of the Glen (BBC TV/Ecosse)
- Casualty (BBC TV)
- As If (Ch4/Carnival/Columbia Tri-Star)
- Urpo and Turpo (Lumifilm, Helsinki).

=== Plays for radio ===
- The Key to My Father's House (BBC R4, The Monday Play, starring Ken Colley, Francesca Brill, Adam Hussein)
- Canada Park (BBC R4, The Monday Play, starring Harry Towb, James Coyle and Tom Rogers)
- Dancing Backwards (BBC R4, The Friday Play, starring Bill Nighy, Frances Barber, Sheridan Smith)

=== Screenplays ===
- The Great Wall of China (Deco Films, funded by the EEC's Media II development fund)
- The Runner (20th Century Fox)
- Cloudberry 9 (Film Development Corporation)
- The Millennium Job (Ardent Productions/Mel Smith)
- "Moomins on the Riviera" (Handle Productions/Pic Tak). A hand-drawn animation feature film based on Tove Jansson's original Moomins comic strips.

=== Directed ===
- Foot in the Door (Just Films/Anglia TV)
- Once Upon a Time (LSA/Eastern Arts)
- How Green is My Alley? (LSA)
- Filigree, a documentary (Just Films/BFI/Eastern Arts)
- That Green Stuff (Scene, BBC2)
- Space Station: Milton Keynes (Screen Two, BBC 2)
- Lola (BBC 1)
- She's Not There (BBC 1)
- Terry (BBC 1)

=== Publications ===
- Wide Games (Longmans)
- Good Neighbours (Longmans)
- Stewart, Leslie (1985), Three minute heroes, Act now., Cambridge University Press, ISBN 978-0-521-31895-2
- Stewart, Leslie; Paul, Jeremy; Tarney, Alan; Spencer, Trevor (1988), Mistletoe & wine, Madrid editado por EMI-Odeón D.L, OCLC 431285025
- Stewart, Leslie (1989), Two of Us, Arlington Books, ISBN 978-0-85140-749-4
