= Tina Mahon =

British actress (born 1971)

Tina Mahon (born 24 June 1971 in London, England) is a former teenage actress who played Veronica "Ronnie" Birtles in the BBC school drama Grange Hill. A series regular from 1985 to 1990, Mahon made a final cameo in 1991. Mahon then appeared in one episode of ITV's The Bill filmed in late summer 1990, but made no further television appearances. During the 1990s she was the romantic partner of Grange Hill co-star John Alford, including during his trial and brief imprisonment in 1999.
