= Emma Kearney (actress) =

Irish actress (born 1981)

- Born: 1981 (age 43–44); Portglenone, County Antrim, Northern Ireland
- Occupation: Actress
- Years active: 2001–2012
- Notable work: Television: Emmerdale (2007); The Gemma Factor (2010); Film: Mr. Bhatti on Chutti (2012)

Emma Kearney (born 1981) is a Northern Irish film, television and theatre actress. She is best known for her roles in British television series such as her recurring role as Rita Brannigan in soap opera Emmerdale and the sitcom The Gemma Factor.

== Career ==
=== Television ===
Kearney has made guest appearances on many British television series. Her first role was in Channel 4 soap opera Hollyoaks in 2003. In 2006, Emma landed a recurring role as Rita Brannigan on Emmerdale as Paddy's love interest. In 2010, she had a lead role in BBC Three sitcom The Gemma Factor. Emma also appeared on the made-for-television films Omagh and The Baby War.

On 9 December 2010 she appeared as a midwife on the live episode of ITV1 soap opera Coronation Street, which was her second appearance on the show, and her first being back in 2004. Emma's other acting credits include Where the Heart Is, Shameless, Spooks: Code 9, and Doctors.

=== Theatre ===
Kearney trained at Manchester Metropolitan Capitol School of Theatre and has appeared in several theatre productions throughout her acting career.

Between 2001 and 2003 she starred in productions at the Capitol Theatre in Manchester including Love's Labour's Lost, The Cherry Orchard, The Provok'd Wife, The Taming of the Shrew, and Dancing at Lughnasa.

In 2003, she appeared in Translations at the Library Theatre. She appeared in three plays in 2006, the first was Separate Tables at the Royal Exchange Theatre, and the others, The Mortal Ash, and Midden at the Oldham Coliseum Theatre. In 2009, she appeared in the touring play Pack of Lies at the Devonshire Park Theatre.

== Filmography ==
Television
| Year | Title | Role | Notes |
|---|---|---|---|
| 2003 | Hollyoaks | Nurse | |
| 2004 | Donovan | Dental Receptionist | |
| 2004 | Omagh | TV Receptionist | TV movie |
| 2004 | Coronation Street | Midwife | |
| 2004 | Outlaws | Prostitute | 1 episode: Damaged Goods |
| 2004 | The Courtroom | Sarah Wright | 1 episode: Balloon Rage |
| 2004 | I Deal | Jackie | |
| 2005 | The Baby War | Receptionist | TV movie |
| 2005 | Ideal | Jackie | 1 episode: The Party |
| 2005 | Where the Heart Is | Jennifer | 1 episode: Stamp of Approval |
| 2005 | Northern Lights | Kim Ashby | |
| 2005 | Nice House, Shame About the Garden | Herself/Landscape Team | |
| 2006 | Shameless | Reporter | 1 episode: #3.1 |
| 2006 | Goldplated | Hospital Manager | 2 episodes: The Funeral, Lauren's Affair |
| 2007 | Emmerdale | Rita Brannigan | recurring role |
| 2007 | Torn Up Tales | Bev | |
| 2008 | Spooks: Code 9 | Police Officer Interviewee | |
| 2008 | Wired | Linda Greeves | |
| 2010 | The Gemma Factor | Janet Grantham | main character |
| 2010 | Doctors | Pat Jameson | 1 episode: Best Laid Plans |
| 2010 | Coronation Street | Midwife | live episode dated Thursday 9 December 2010 |
| 2012 | Mr. Bhatti on Chutti | Alice | First role in Bollywood movie |
