= Fiona McLean =

British actress

Fiona McLean, also known as Fiona Mogridge or Fiona Lee-Fraser, is a British former actress and TV presenter turned photographer.

She was known to millions of viewers as schoolgirl Laura Reagan in the BBC school drama Grange Hill, a role she played from 1986 to 1988. The following year, she co-presented the BBC children's series Move It with ex-Brookside actor Simon O'Brien, who himself would appear in Grange Hill from 2003.

Fiona now runs a photography business, specialising in weddings, cover shoots and portraiture. She was married to international racing driver Johnny Mowlem and has two children.
