= Kelly George (actor) =

British actor (born 1970)

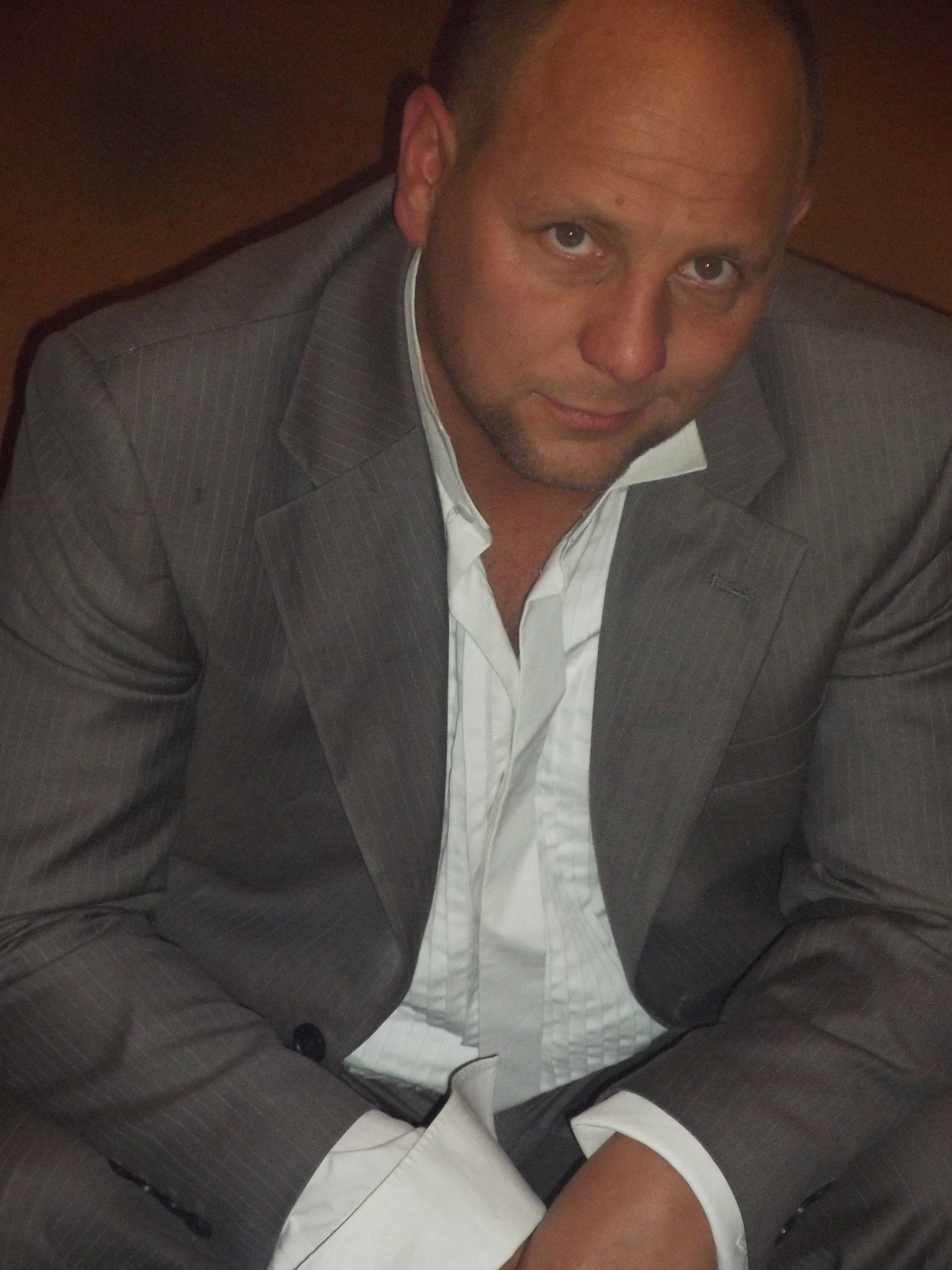
- Born: 19 December 1970 (age 55); Newport Pagnell, Buckinghamshire, England, UK
- Education: Sylvia Young Theatre School
- Known for: Actor/Producer
- Notable work: Grange Hill, RocknRolla, The Bill

Kelly George (born 19 December 1970) is a British actor, best known for his long association with the BBC school drama series Grange Hill, playing Ray Haynes.

== Acting ==
George's acting career began in 1984 playing Charlie Bates in Cameron Mackintosh's "Oliver" and after finishing, was asked to join Sylvia Young Theatre School. While studying there. he filmed Who, Sir? Me, Sir?, "Three Penny Opera", "No Place Like Home", "Christine", and had a Carl Davis musical written for him: Kip's War where he played the title character Kip.

George first became associated with Grange Hill in 1986, when he appeared on the BBC programme Drugwatch Special: It's Not Just Zammo. The programme, a hybrid of Crimewatch and Grange Hill, was broadcast on 1 April 1986 to link with the Grange Hill storyline of Zammo McGuire's heroin addiction.

In 1987, George appeared in Grange Hill as one of a gang of boys from rival school, St Joseph's, who were causing trouble with deputy head Mr Bronson, though, he is best known as motormouth Ray Haynes, a Grange Hill pupil whom he played from 1991 to 1993. In a surprise move, Ray was brought back to Grange Hill in 1997, this time as the proprietor of a café near the school where the incumbent pupils "hung out" and made up the bulk of his customers.

While filming Grange Hill, George appeared as himself in many TV Shows including "The Broom Cupboard", Blue Peter and Going Live! where he was interviewed by Robbie Williams. George finally left Grange Hill in 2002. Since then, he has appeared in The Bill and Casualty, the latter being his second appearance in the programme.

Since the end of his acting career Kelly George now focuses on film funding and producing and spends his free time supporting local charities/communities within Newport Pagnell and Northamptonshire.

== Filmography ==
Year	Title	Role	Notes
1985	Who, Sir? Me, Sir?	Gary	TV series
1985	Terry and June	Douane	TV series
1986	The Little Match Girl	First Urchin	TV movie
1987	Christine	Eddie	TV series
1987	Grange Hill	Unnamed St Joseph's pupil	TV series
1989	Bergerac	Dennis	TV series
1989	Howards' Way	Ted	TV series
1989	Mack the Knife	Leading dancer	-
1989	The Return of Shelley	Paper Boy	TV series
1991–1993	Grange Hill	Ray Haynes	TV series
1993–2006	Casualty	Ray David / Steve	TV series
1994	Anna Lee	Kevin's Mate	TV series
1997–2002	Grange Hill	Ray Haynes	TV series
1997–2008	The Bill	Sgt. Mike Grainger / Kyle Timms / Roy Lowe	TV series
2006	Switch	TV Licence Man	TV series
2008	RocknRolla	Danny	Film
