= Nicholas Donnelly (actor) =

British actor (1938–2022)

Nicholas Donnelly (13 March 1938 – 9 January 2022) was a British actor who was best known for appearing in the television drama series Grange Hill as Craig MacKenzie from 1985 to 1993, and as Sergeant Johnny Wills in the police series Dixon of Dock Green from 1960 to 1976.

== Life and career ==
Donnelly was born in Kensington, London on 13 March 1938. He met his future wife, Alrun, whilst undertaking National Service in Germany during the late 1950s.

Donnelly was a supporter of the football team Queens Park Rangers. He had two sons and twin daughters, as well as five grandchildren. Donnelly died on 9 January 2022, at the age of 83.

== Filmography ==
Year	Title	Role	Notes
1958	Carry On Sergeant	Recruit	Uncredited
1979	That Summer!	Detective	
1979	A Nightingale Sang in Berkeley Square	Security Guard #4	
1981	Venom	Superintendent Police	
1984	Don't Open till Christmas	Doctor Bridle	(scenes deleted)
1985	Lifeforce	Police Inspector	
