= Karen Ford =

English actress (born 1946)

- Born: 9 February 1946 (age 80)
- Occupation: Actress
- Spouse: Rio Fanning (m. 1988; died 2018)

Karen Ford (born 9 February 1946) is an English actress.

== Career ==
Ford trained at the Guildhall School of Music and Drama. Her first contract after leaving this school was at the newly built Yvonne Arnaud Theatre.

Ford appeared in stage productions such as The Doctor’s Dilemma by George Bernard Shaw (Yvonne Arnaud Theatre and West End theatre), John Kerr's Mistress of Novices (West End theatre) and Otherwise Engaged by Simon Gray. She participated in a number of films, including Fame (1980), Willie & Phil (1980) and Flyboys (2006).

She played the role of Art teacher, Miss Booth, for seven years in Grange Hill. She also appeared in television series such as The Avengers, Softly, Softly, Doctors and Emmerdale. Ford's last screen credit was in the short film From What I Remember (2026).

== Personal life ==
Ford married the actor and writer Rio Fanning in 1988; Fanning died in 2018.

== Selected filmography ==
=== Television ===
Year	Title	Role	Notes
1967	The Avengers	Nurse	Episode: "Never, Never Say Die"
1967	Vendetta	Claudia di Benco	Episode: "The Scandal Man"
1967	The Revenue Men	June Carroll	Episode: "The New Faces"
1968	Softly, Softly	Ruth Watkins	Episode: "An Old Song"
1968	The Jazz Age	Adela	Episode: "Lonely Road"
1969	The Wednesday Play		Episode: "Blodwen, Home from Rachel's Marriage"
1970	NBC Experiment in Television	Secretary	Episode: "The Engagement"
1970	Doomwatch	Mrs. Bonenti	Episode: "Spectre at the Feast"
1977	Z-Cars	Miss Rankine	Episode: "Transit"
1977	Crossroads	Mandy Scott	Episode #2830
1985–91	Grange Hill	Miss Booth	119 Episodes
1992	Screen One	Publisher 1	Episode: "Running Late"
1993	EastEnders	Clerk	Episode #868
1993	The Bill	Mrs. Gale	Episode: "Divided We Fall"
1996	The 10%ers	Shelley Johnson	Episode: "Every Cloud"
1997	Peak Practice	Dr. Grant	Episode: "Lost Feelings"
1999	Holby City	Mrs. Fallon	3 Episodes
2014	Coronation Street	Kerry Waddle	Episode #8494
