= John Alford (actor) =

British actor (1971–2026)

- Born: John James Shannon; 30 October 1971; Glasgow, Scotland
- Died: 13 March 2026 (aged 54); Scottow, Norfolk, England
- Occupations: Actor; singer
- Years active: 1982–2017

John James Shannon (30 October 1971 – 13 March 2026), better known by his stage name John Alford, was a British actor, singer, convicted child sex offender and drug dealer. He played Robbie Wright in the BBC series Grange Hill (1985–1990) and Billy Ray in the ITV series London's Burning (1993–1998). He also had three Top 30 hits on the UK singles chart in 1996.

== Life and career ==
Born in Glasgow, Alford attended Anna Scher's stage school from age 11 in London, alongside future EastEnders actors Sid Owen and Patsy Palmer.

Alford appeared as a child actor in the ITV sitcom Now and Then between 1983 and 1984 before landing the role of Robbie Wright in 1985 in Grange Hill. Alford featured on the Grange Hill "Just Say No" anti-drug single. In 1982, he appeared on Not the Nine O'Clock News, joining in a song about a strike-breaking train driver.

In 1993, Alford took his highest profile adult role as fireman Billy Ray in ITV's London's Burning, remaining in the role until he was sacked in 1998. He was convicted in 1999 of supplying drugs.

In 1996, this led to a short-lived singing career during which he released a self-titled album, but it did not chart. His first single release was "Smoke Gets in Your Eyes", which reached number 13 and stayed on the UK chart for five weeks. His highest hit was "Blue Moon"/"Only You", which reached number 9 on the UK charts and stayed on the UK chart for four weeks. A further single, "If"/"Keep on Running", reached number 24 and stayed on the UK chart for three weeks. Alford's fourth and final single, "Let It Be Me", was scheduled for release in March 1997, but was withdrawn at the last minute. Finished copies, some with "promotional use only" stickers, exist. Alford was then dropped by his record label.

In 2001, Alford gained a role in the film Mike Bassett: England Manager. In 2003, he played the part of drug-dealing and scheming flight attendant Dean in the TV drama Mile High. In 2005, Alford appeared on the reality TV show Trust Me – I'm a Beauty Therapist, in which celebrities trained and worked in a salon doing hair and beauty. He appeared twice on Casualty, in May 2009 and May 2010, and was a prison guard on the 2017 crime film The Hatton Garden Job.

With only intermittent acting work from 2000 onwards, he picked up work as a roofer, scaffolder and mini-cab driver. He returned to living in Camden using his real name, John Shannon.

== Criminal convictions ==
In 1999, Alford was convicted of supplying drugs to the News of the World undercover reporter Mazher Mahmood, and subsequently imprisoned for nine months. During his trial, Alford said in his defence that he was set up, and complained that Mahmood was not punished for this. He was released after six weeks after agreeing to electronic tagging. Alford has stated that Mahmood claimed to be a well-connected prince who could offer him a lucrative contract. Following the collapse of the trial of Tulisa in 2014, when the judge said there were "strong grounds for believing" Mahmood had committed perjury, Alford told Panorama that the conviction had led him to suicidal thoughts. He said: "No one can give me the 18 years I’ve lost; no one can give me that back. I hope this is the first day of a new life for me."

In 2006, he was convicted of drink-driving after crashing his car into three vehicles in April 2005. He was given a 16-month driving ban plus a fine and court costs.

On 1 October 2018, Alford appeared at Highbury Corner Magistrates' Court, where he pleaded not guilty to two counts of assault on a police officer, and guilty to a charge of criminal damage to a vehicle belonging to Camden Council on 1 September 2018 in Holloway, London. He was bailed to appear for trial at the same court on 29 November 2018. On 29 January 2019, Alford pleaded guilty to two counts of resisting an officer and was given a 12-month community order.

In July 2024, Alford was charged with sex offences involving two teenage girls. He appeared at St Albans Crown Court on 26 August 2025. Alford denied the charges saying in court: "I haven't done this. No DNA. I didn't touch them. I think science proves me not guilty." On 5 September 2025, Alford was found guilty of sexually assaulting a 14-year-old girl and a 15-year-old girl at a house in Hoddesdon, Hertfordshire, in April 2022. Upon being convicted, Alford shouted "Wrong; I didn't do this" from the dock. He was sentenced to eight and a half years in prison on 14 January 2026.

== Death ==
On 13 March 2026, Alford, aged 54, was found dead in his prison cell at HMP Bure. A Prison Service spokesman announced that the Prisons and Probation Ombudsman would investigate the circumstances, as is standard procedure for all deaths in custody.. On 16 June 2026, it was announced that the cause of death was ischaemic heart disease.

== Discography ==
=== Studio albums ===
Date	Title	Chart positions
Date	Title	UK
25 November 1996	John Alford	#171

=== Singles ===
Date	Title	Chart positions	Album
Date	Title	UK	Album
5 February 1996	"Smoke Gets in Your Eyes"	#13	John Alford
13 May 1996	"Blue Moon"/"Only You"	#9	John Alford
11 November 1996	"If"/"Keep on Running"	#24	John Alford
March 1997	"Let It Be Me"	Cancelled Before Release	John Alford
