= Gwyneth Powell =

British actress (1946–2022)

- Born: 5 July 1946; Levenshulme, Manchester, England
- Died: 8 September 2022 (aged 76); Brighton, East Sussex, England
- Education: Goldsmiths, University of London
- Occupation: Actress
- Years active: 1969–2022
- Television: Grange Hill
- Spouse: Alan Leith (m. 1971)

Gwyneth Leith (5 July 1946 – 8 September 2022), known professionally as Gwyneth Powell, was an English actress. She was best known for her portrayal of headmistress Bridget McClusky in the BBC television series Grange Hill for eleven series between 1981 and 1991.

== Background ==
Powell was born on 5 July 1946 in Levenshulme, Manchester, and attended Cheadle County Grammar School for Girls, during which time she appeared to some acclaim as Fat Urs in the National Youth Theatre's production of Ben Jonson's Bartholemew Fair. She originally trained as a teacher at Goldsmiths, University of London, but instead chose to act in repertory theatre.

== Career ==
Powell's first major television role was in the 1971 LWT dystopian drama series, The Guardians. She was a regular, if minor, player in many television dramas until being cast in Grange Hill, in which she played the "firm but fair" headmistress Bridget ("The Midget") McClusky for eleven years. Of her role, she said in 2008:

At first Mrs McClusky was written as a 'twin set and pearls' role but I was quite young at the time and didn't want to play it like that. We started with the clothes and she was quite fashion conscious and chic. I was told by lots of people she was a great fillip to young women teachers who started applying for headships. The show had repercussions in all kinds of ways and the character did too. My period did coincide with the Thatcher years. I think Mrs McClusky became memorable because we had a prime minister like that.

Eventually, Powell decided to pursue other interests and gave the Grange Hill producers and writers a year to write McClusky out of the series. She bought the rights to E. M. Delafield's Diary of a Provincial Lady and adapted it as a self-financed one-woman show in Edinburgh, also touring the production.

Powell went on to appear in other television programmes such as Heartbeat, A Touch of Frost, Holby City, Hetty Wainthropp Investigates and Father Brown, and in 2008, Echo Beach. She played the role of a school teacher in a Victorian School Day in an episode of the BBC Schools TV series Watch. In 2009, using archive footage, coupled with some newly recorded lines, Powell reprised her Grange Hill role as Mrs McClusky for a cameo appearance in an episode of Ashes to Ashes, set in 1982. She also appeared in Arsenic and Old Lace at the Salisbury Playhouse. In 2010, Powell starred as Nana in The Gemma Factor. Subsequently, in 2011–2013, she became a support character in the teen programme House of Anubis, playing the role of Nina Martin's gran who ends up in hospital but is later released. She featured in seven episodes. In 2013 she took the role of Greg Davies' mother Polly Davies in the Channel 4 comedy Man Down.

== Personal life ==
Powell married actor Alan Leith in 1971. She lived in Hurstpierpoint, West Sussex, where she was a patron of a local drama group, the Hurstpierpoint Players.

She died in Brighton on 8 September 2022, aged 76. Her death was attributed to complications following surgery for a perforated colon.

== Filmography ==
Year	Title	Role	Notes	Ref.
1969	Rogues' Gallery	Second Lady	1 episode	
1971	The Guardians	Clare Weston	11 episodes	
1972	Villains	Belinda	2 episodes	
1972	Z Cars	Jean Knight	1 episode	
1972	Rest assured: Lift Off	Mrs Johnson	TV film	
1973	Putting on the Agony	Gill	TV film	
1973	ITV Sunday Knight Theatre	Willy		
1974	A Raging Calm	Agnes Sutton	TV mini series, 4 episodes	
1974	Father Brown	Helen Smaill	1 episode	
1975	Play for Today	Elvira Lewis	1 episode	
1975	Public Eye	Clare	1 episode	
1975	Beryl's Lot	Anita	2 episodes	
1976	Couples	Lynn Baker	TV series, 6 episodes	
1972–1976	Dixon of Dock Green	Val Colebrook (1972), Mrs Regan (1972), Anne Hastings (1973), Diane Barnet (1979), Jane Mason (1976)	TV series, 5 episodes	
1976	Face of Darkness	Eileen		
1976	Coronation Street	Diana Kenton	3 episodes	
1976	Emmerdale	Julie Croft	Guest role	
1978	ITV Playhouse	Doreen	1 episode	
1978	People Like Us	Frances Hopkins	5 episodes	
1978	Accident	Betty Richards	3 episodes	
1978–1980	Armchair Thriller	Woman PC (1978), Doris (1980)	6 episodes	
1980	The Enigma Files	Anne Gerrard	1 episode	
1980	Can We Get on Now, Please?		1 episode	
1978	Loophole	Doreen		
1982	Squadron	Margaret Gran	4 episodes	
1982, 1984	The Gentle Touch	DI Mary Woods	2 episodes	
1986	Chance in a Million	Maureen	1 episode	
1980–1991	Grange Hill	Mrs McClusky	169 episodes	
1994	Open Fire	Gloria Martin	TV film	
1996	Hetty Wainthropp Investigates	Marian Horner	1 episode	
1997	A Touch of Frost	Kitty Rayford	3 episodes	
1998	Magic with Everything	Aunt Matilda	TV series	
1998, 2002	Peak Practice	Annie Gibson (1998), Rose Meredith (2002)	2 episodes	
1999	A Kind of Hush	Mrs P.		
2001, 2006	Holby City	Jean (2001), Margaret Tanner (2006)	2 episodes	
2001	Back to the Secret Garden	Toby the Maid	Film	
2003	Family Affairs	Judge Yardley	1 episode	
2003, 2006	Doctors	Janet Armstrong (2003), Janice Wilson (2006)	Guest roles	
2004	Down to Earth	Mrs Dean	1 episode	
2004, 2009	Heartbeat	Shirley Baxter (2004), Margaret Millwood (2009)	2 episodes	
2004	The Royal	Bunty Weatherill	1 episode	
2005	Emmerdale	Sophie Kidderminster	Guest role	
2007	Piccadilly Cowboy	Alice		
2008	Echo Beach	Ivy Trehearne	11 episodes	
2009	Ashes to Ashes	Mrs McClusky	1 episode, archive footage with newly recorded audio from Powell.	
2010	The Gemma Factor	Nana	6 episodes	
2011	Little Crackers	Headmistress	1 episode	
2012	House of Anubis	Nina's Grandmother	7 episodes	
2013	The Matt Lucas Awards	Herself	1 episode	
2013	A Touch of Cloth	Mrs McClusky	1 episode	
2013–2017	Man Down	Polly Davies	19 episodes	
2014	Casualty	Gloria Pots	1 episode	
2022	Not Going Out	Nice lady	1 episode	
2022	Grace	Joan Talbot	1 episode	
