= Grange Hill series 8 =

Grange Hill
- Season 8
- No. of episodes: 19 (18 & Christmas Special)

Release
- Original network: BBC One
- Original release: 18 February – 22 April 1985 (Christmas Special: 27 December 1985)

Season chronology
- ← Previous; Series 7 Next → Series 9

The eighth series of the British television drama series Grange Hill began broadcasting on 18 February 1985, until 22 April 1985 (with a Christmas special broadcast on 27 December 1985) on BBC One. The series follows the lives of the staff and Students of the eponymous school, an inner-city London comprehensive school. It consists of nineteen episodes (including a Christmas Special).

== Cast and characters ==
=== Students ===
- Paula Ann Bland as Claire Scott
- Mark Burdis as Christopher 'Stewpot' Stewart
- Dulice Liecier as Precious Matthews
- Mark Savage as Gripper Stebson
- Lee MacDonald as Samuel 'Zammo' McGuire
- Erkan Mustafa as Roland Browning
- Alison Bettles as Fay Lucas
- Simone Nylander as Janet St. Clair
- Nadia Chambers as Annette Firman
- Terry Kinsella as Jimmy Flynn
- Lisa York as Julie Marchant
- Julie-Ann Steel as Diane Cooney
- Anita Savage as Mandy Firth
- Joanne Bell as Sarah Wilks
- Melissa Wilks as Jackie Wright
- Mmoloki Chrystie as Kevin Baylon
- Tim Polley as Banksy Banks
- Douglas Chamberlain as Julian Fairbrother
- James Hickling as Eric Wallace
- Bonita Jones as Emma Stebson
- Simone Hyams as Calley Donnington
- John Drummond as Trevor Cleaver
- Tina Mahon as Ronnie Birtles
- John Alford as Robbie Wright
- John Holmes as Luke 'Gonch' Gardner
- Steve West as Vince Savage
- Ruth Carraway as Helen Kelly
- Joann Kenny as Jane Bishop
- Bradley Sheppard as Paul 'Hollo' Holloway
- Fleur Taylor as Imelda Davis
- Samantha Lewis as Georgina Hayes

=== Teachers ===
- Michael Cronin as Mr Geoff Baxter
- Gwyneth Powell as Mrs Bridget McClusky
- Simon Heywood as Mr Nick Smart
- Nicholas Donnelly as Mr Craig McKenzie
- George A. Cooper as Mr Eric Griffiths
- Karen Ford as Miss Ginny Booth
- Michael Sheard as Mr Maurice Bronson
- Caroline Gruber as Miss Gillie Washington
- Tony Armatrading as Mr Peter McCartney
- Dennis Edwards as Mr Humphries

== Episodes ==
No.	Episode	Writer(s)	Director	Original airdate
1	Episode One	Barry Purchese and Anthony Minghella	Edward Pugh	18 February 1985
Grange Hill has merged with Rodney Bennett and Brookdale. Old Rodney Bennett Students have turned up at Rodney Bennett in their school uniforms and are throwing stuff at the sign. Mr Smart orders them and a couple of Brookdale kids to clean up the mess before they head to the upper school. Luke "Gonch" Gardner meets Calley (who's brought pet Percy to school) and on the way to school gets off to a bad start with Paul "Hollo" Holloway. Other new additions among the staff and Students are Mr Bronson and Trevor Cleaver. The lower school and upper school room numbering system causes confusion for Mr Smart. Gonch's proposed fight with Hollo turns into a friendship and Trevor Cleaver is not so hard when he discovers that Calley's pet is not the fluffy hamster he was expecting! First Appearances: Luke "Gonch" Gardner, Paul "Hollo" Holloway, Calley Donnington, Ronnie Birtles, Steven "Bansky" Banks, Trevor Cleaver, Vince Savage, Julian Fairbrother, Mr Bronson, Miss Booth and more.
2	Episode Two	David Angus and Anthony Minghella	Edward Pugh	20 February 1985
Romance is in the air at Grange Hill. Who is Annette seeing? She will not tell her mystery man's name except that it begins with 'S'. Mr. Bronson shouts at Eric that he must be deaf as well as stupid and Eric reveals he is partially deaf. Zammo's attitude towards Jackie seems to be pushing her to Banksie. After school, Annette is off to see "Mr. S" and Fay and her friends follow Annette. Finally after running through some flats into a churchyard, the truth is revealed - Annette is in the arms of Stewpot!
3	Episode Three	David Angus and Anthony Minghella	Margie Barbour	25 February 1985
Gonch is acquiring old folders from a skip for resale. Calley is into fortune telling, including palm reading. Can Calley read a palm when it's a photocopy of an unknown person? Mr Smart's squash racquets go missing and the public phone box has been raided. The staff go to see Mrs McClusky about the nuisance and security risk of walking between the two buildings but afterwards the teachers squabble about their personal grievances. Calley gives an unflattering analysis of Jane's handprint, without giving a name, and Jane storms off in a fury.
4	Episode Four	David Angus and Anthony Minghella	Roger Singleton-Turner	27 February 1985
Swapping uniform becomes a craze at Grange Hill. Gonch tries selling wire coat hangers as music stands. Mr Smart confiscates Ronnie's Walkman from Calley but later, it is stolen from the staff room. The Chairman of the Education Committee is being shown round the new Grange Hill building.
5	Episode Five	Margaret Simpson and Anthony Minghella	Margie Barbour	4 March 1985
Stewpot is two-timing Claire with Annette. When Annette finds out Stewpot hasn't broken up with Claire, she gives him an ultimatum. There are still arguments among staff when Mr Smart parks in Mr Bronson's old place. Jackie goes to sit with old Brookdale friends at lunch. Zammo and Kevin start their part-time daily job at the chippy but Zammo suddenly remembers that he had promised to take Jackie to the concert.
6	Episode Six	John Godber and Anthony Minghella	Roger Singleton-Turner	6 March 1985
Zammo tells Mr. Bronson to keep his hair on and has to get off the bus and walk. Stewpot makes an excuse to Claire so that he can go with Annette but she is having difficulty trusting him. Mr. McCartney forgets the tickets, but Julian saves the day with a suggestion to phone home to get the ticket numbers. Stewpot is caught out when Claire turns up in the lobby - Stewpot's secret is out. Zammo gets fed up and resigns from the chippy - but Kevin doesn't. Returning home, Zammo sees Jackie with Banksie's arm around her.
7	Episode Seven	Margaret Simpson	Edward Pugh	11 March 1985
French students arrive to stay with Grange Hill students and there are more than a few communication problems. Calley overhears her parents talking and realizes she is adopted. Calley tells Ronnie about her being adopted, and how her real mother has come back into the country and wants to see her daughter again. Calley tells her friend that she'd not want to meet her real mother for a while but after school she finds her outside the gate and goes off with her. At a party, Roland finds a soul-mate in chocolate-munching Fabienne. Calley's adoptive parents become concerned when Calley doesn't come home.
8	Episode Eight	Barry Purchese	Edward Pugh	13 March 1985
Hollo has made up some fake dental appointment cards. Calley turns up very confused and upset after her night at real mum, Angela's house. Mrs McClusky isn't pleased to find Miss Washington has left her registration class unsupervised and is unsatisfied when she sees Ronnie's hair. A new scheme evolves involving dental cards, rented videos and Hollo's house. Ronnie's coat goes missing, but it's not the only thing: Miss Washington's purse has also disappeared.
9	Episode Nine	Barry Purchese	Margie Barbour	18 March 1985
Calley is arguing with her real mother in the street, which Zammo takes to be a kidnapping in progress, so he, Mandy and Sarah intervene. Meanwhile, the builders catch up with Gonch's O.A.P, and the missing building materials, and come to an arrangement to do the necessary building work in return for some of Gonch's videos. Miss Washington finds evidence that proves that Gonch couldn't have been the thieves. Ronnie tells Calley she must tell Mrs McClusky about her situation, and they go to the Head together. Gonch finds a plastic shop dummy on the dump, and then Robbie tells him his coat's been nicked, along with the copied video cassettes.
10	Episode Ten	Rosemary Mason	TBA	20 March 1985
Gonch and Hollo bring Henry to school - he's the plastic dummy they found on the dump. Henry is almost run over when they drop him while crossing the busy road outside school and Mr Bronson is not amused. When Gonch asks Mr Smart for his Walkman, he finds that it's become another stolen item. Gonch and Hollo recover the confiscated "Henry", realizing that it is wearing Gonch's Mac with his name inside.
11	Episode Eleven	Rosemary Mason	Roger Singleton-Turner	25 March 1985
New timetables are introduced but they cause additional confusion. Gonch loans a new Walkman off Vince and uses it to bug the Staff Room. He's almost caught by Mr Baxter, but Hollo distracts him in time. Unfortunately, the bugging only reveals Mr Smart asking Miss Washington out. Both Fay and Annette find themselves left on the sidelines when their respective partners have the chance of a kick about. Precious and Stewpot give an early practice performance of a song from Mr. McCartney's "Mods and Rockers" musical. Zammo and Banksie both seem to be unable to separate fact from fiction when it comes to playing their parts as potential suitors for Jackie's character.
12	Episode Twelve	Frances Galleymore	Roger Singleton-Turner	27 March 1985
Roland has spent so much time with Fabienne that he decides to become French and wears a beret. Claire's beginning to lose patience with Stewpot's feeble excuses and Precious also tells him to give up Annette. Banksie leads an expedition to the derelict Brookdale building. It seems empty, but Fay grows nervous when Jean-Paul starts causing damage. They find the caretaker's office, complete with television. Back at the school library, Julie and Julian share their mutual dislike of all things French. Back at the Brookdale site, Fay is certain she can hear something - and sure enough a caretaker appears and gives chase. Fay leaves a shoe behind in her haste to leave.
13	Episode Thirteen	Frances Galleymore	John Smith	1 April 1985
Gonch has bugged the staff room again to try to find the thieves. Partially deaf Eric is knocked down while walking between the schools, which causes Mrs McClusky to take action. Later, whilst babysitting at Mr McCartney's house, Annette is with Stewpot, but Fay is rapidly getting fed up with Jean Paul, who lights up. After they've been dancing a while, they smell burning - Jean-Paul's fag has burned the expensive carpet. Julian unexpectedly turns up as Stewpot leaves, and embarrassed Fay has some explaining to do. Fay comes clean about the damaged carpet to an angry Mr McCartney. Meanwhile, outside, Stewpot has caught up with Claire, and promises not to see Annette any more.
14	Episode Fourteen	Anthony Minghella and Barry Purchese	John Smith	3 April 1985
Julian's mother tells him that his dog, who's as old as he is, is nearing the end of his life, and that the animal ought to be put down. At school, Fay comes across Julian, intending to dump him. He breaks down though, before she can say anything, telling her about his dog being put down, but he then guesses that she was waiting for Jean Paul. At the deserted factory, Jean Paul's driving becomes reckless, and to make matters worth, Banksie's brother Phil turns up. Finally, the car goes out of control, and turns over... Sarah ends up in hospital, but Jean-Paul escapes unharmed. Mrs McClusky intends to suspend those involved - and Jean Paul will be sent back to France. Zammo has a go at Banksie, but he's already badly bruised from his brother's intervention. The parents of Sarah, Banksie and Jackie visit Mrs McClusky, but she's adamant that all of them will be suspended. At the hospital, Fay and Julian go to visit Sarah, but Miss Booth and Jean-Paul also turn up. Jean-Paul goes in alone - but Sarah, her face heavily disfigured and bandaged, looks away when she sees him. Miss Booth suggests that Fay and Julian can replace the suspended Jackie and Banksie in the Musical. Julian is so pleased at the prospect of spending more time with Fay that he almost leaves the hospital without visiting Sarah! Final Appearance: Sarah Wilks
15	Episode Fifteen	John Godber	David Bell	10 April 1985
Hollo smartens up his image. There are demonstrations outside school to protest for the need for a Pelican crossing. The council sends a representative to see for himself the danger of the road outside the school. Gonch takes "Henry" (the plastic dummy) for a swim, but Mr Baxter is not amused. The question arises - does Mr Bronson wear a wig? When he goes swimming, and leaves his toupee by the side of the pool, the answer is revealed. Gonch grabs the toupee, but Hollo finds that someone's grabbed his trousers!
16	Episode Sixteen	Margaret Simpson	John Godber	15 April 1985
Gonch bugs the staff room one more time, to find out if Mr. Bronson knows he and Hollo took his toupee. Mr Bronson turns up in a backup wig, which has a different colour. Calley and Ronnie wash the stolen wig in home economics but tell Gonch that it has shrunk. Later, Mr Smart pulls Gonch out of his lesson - he is under suspicion of doing the thefts, and the whole truth of the bugging is revealed. Playing back the tape reveals the voices of the real thieves - Gripper Stebson, his sister and Denny Rees. It seems that stealing wasn't the only crime though - the set for the musical has been completely destroyed! Guest Appearance: Mark Savage as Gripper Stebson (voice only).
17	Episode Seventeen	Margaret Simpson and Anthony Minghella	Roger Singleton-Turner	17 April 1985
Roland's back from France after his extremely small holiday. Away from school, coming towards the end of their suspension, Banksie hints to Jackie that he might have had something to do with the destruction of the set. Fay's not too impressed with the scenery. Also, when she learns that she's got to turn up for rehearsal on the same day as her sports day, she storms off, and the whole affair looks doomed. Ronnie learns that Gonch is planning to cheat by using a revision tape in the exams and she swaps the tapes. As it happens though, she's done him a favour when Mr Bronson investigates his suspicious scarf-encased head, and finds only music playing. Mandy has a go at Fay on the sports field, accusing her of smashing up the sets but Miss Washington is more conciliatory suggesting a Sunday rehearsal.
18	Episode Eighteen	Barry Purchese	Roger Singleton-Turner	22 April 1985
At the dress rehearsal there's a bad feeling about the unrealistic set and especially the lack of motorbikes. Banksie wants to make a contribution to the musical, but no one will hear him out. The first half of the performance goes moderately well, but even the mayor observes that it lacks punch. Banksie's idea is revealed - a set of real-life bikers is outside the school, ready to bring on their machines for a finale, but Mrs McClusky has caught wind of the plan and has to be persuaded first. Final Appearances: Julian Fairbrother, Annette Firman, Mandy Firth and Precious Matthews
19	Christmas Special	Phil Redmond	John Smith	27 December 1985
Grange Hill are setting up the Christmas Fair. Roland's Christmas seems doomed with his father off on a long-distance lorry trip. Christmas in Paris is an attractive option, but the price of £30 is £20 more than he owns. The £25 prize for the Around Britain buzzer game seems to open up possibilities, especially if he can get some practice in first. Calley is torn between having Christmas with her natural mother and her adopted one. Gonch gets soaked by Imelda and has to walk home in his shorts. Gonch and Hollo go and get another table from the furniture store and find a donkey! Roland finds it impossible to do the buzzer game, and Stewpot insists on having a go instead. When it comes to Banksie's go, Trevor Cleaver disconnects the battery. Roly walks off in misery, but Janet catches up and persuades him to come to her house for Christmas. Mr Baxter is constantly pummelled by water sponges as part of the stand he is assisting with by a sizeable crowd - with Gripper Stebson among them, much to his chagrin! Calley's adoptive mum turns up and tells her that she's invited Angela around for Christmas. The donkey leaves the hall followed by Gonch and Mr Baxter. After some persuasion, upon discovering that her owner left her in the school to avoid having to put her down, Mrs McClusky allows the donkey to stay as the school pet. First Appearances: Imelda Davis, Helen Kelly, Georgina Hayes, Mr Griffiths and Harriet the school donkey. Last Appearances: Claire Scott, Stewpot Stewart, Mr Smart, Miss Washington and more. Guest Appearance: Mark Savage as Gripper Stebson.

== Release history ==
The eighth series of Grange Hill was released by Eureka Entertainment on DVD on 11 November 2019. This series includes English subtitles on all 18 episodes on three DVD discs, with format of 4:3 and total running time of 438 mins. (7hrs 18min).

Also bundled with this series is the 1981 Christmas Special, broadcast 28 December, which lasts 24mins.

Series 8 was also added to the Streaming site BritBox in November 2021
