= Grange Hill series 7 =

Season of television series

Grange Hill
- Season 7
- No. of episodes: 18

Release
- Original network: BBC One
- Original release: 3 January – 2 March 1984

Season chronology
- ← Previous; Series 6 Next → Series 8

The seventh series of the British television drama series Grange Hill began broadcasting on 3 January 1984, before ending on 2 March 1984 on BBC One. The series follows the lives of the staff and Students of the eponymous school, an inner-city London comprehensive school. It consists of eighteen episodes.

== Cast and characters ==
=== Students ===
- Peter Emmett (previously credited as Peter Moran) as Pogo Patterson
- Mark Baxter as Duane Orpington
- Joanne Boakes as Anita Unsworth
- Paula Ann Bland as Claire Scott
- Mark Burdis as Christopher "Stewpot" Stewart
- Dulice Liecier as Precious Matthews
- Susan Tully as Suzanne Ross
- Lisa East as Christine Everson
- Mark Savage as Gripper Stebson
- Julian Griffiths as Denny Rees
- Kaka Singh as Randir Singh
- Steven Woodcock as Glenroy
- Lee MacDonald as Zammo McGuire
- Erkan Mustafa as Roland Browning
- Alison Bettles as Fay Lucas
- Simone Nylander as Janet St. Clair
- Nadia Chambers as Annette Firman
- Terry Kinsella as Jimmy Flynn
- Lisa York as Julie Marchant
- Julie-Ann Steel as Diane Cooney
- Anita Savage as Mandy Firth
- Joanne Bell as Sarah Wilks
- Vincent Matthews as Jeremy Irvine
- Melissa Wilks as Jackie Wright
- Mmoloki Chrystie as Kevin Baylon
- Gary Love as Jimmy McLaren
- Gary Hailes as Nigel Flavin

=== Teachers ===
- Michael Cronin as Mr. Geoff Baxter
- Robert Hartley as Mr. Keating
- Gwyneth Powell as Mrs. Bridget McClusky
- Allyson Rees as Miss Jenny Lexington
- Fraser Cains as Mr. Bill 'Scruffy' McGuffey
- Simon Heywood as Mr. Nick Smart
- Chris Jury as Mr. Knowles
- Kara Wilson as Miss Caroline Gordon
- Michael Osborne as Mr. Peter Howard
- Alison Newmarch as Miss Hartley

== Episodes ==
No.	Episode	Writer(s)	Director	Original airdate
1	Episode One	Phil Redmond and Barry Purchese	Carol Wilks	3 January 1984
It is the first day of a new term and Zammo collects girlfriend Jackie on the way to school. Suzanne is nearly 16, and is desperate to leave. Mr. Hopwood has left Grange Hill and Mr. Smart finds out he is H5's form tutor. Zammo leaves Jackie at her school, Brookdale, and makes some new enemies with the other Brookdale boys. Jonah has moved away and his cousin Jeremy Irving is now going to Grange Hill. Jeremy tells Zammo that Brookdale is merging with Rodney Bennet and that is why he moved. Stewpot's impression of Mr. Smart goes down well and Mr. Smart turns up and overhears it. Annette's first incident with Miss Gordon, who is Miss Mooney's replacement, is not good. Jeremy finds the print room is an excellent place to make fake bus tickets. First appearances: Miss Gordon and Jackie Wright
2	Episode Two	Phil Redmond and Margaret Simpson	Carol Wilks	6 January 1984
Randir starts a chain letter but Pogo uses the scheme for himself to make money, but the maths side of it is too difficult. Claire gives out biorhythm readings to her classmates of H5. She tries the staff, but some will not co-operate, like Mr. Smart. Stewpot and Pogo spend the maths lesson trying to get around the chain letter idea. Miss Gordon seems to be getting the attention of the male teachers and the female Students are shocked to see her in Mr. Smart's car.
3	Episode Three	Phil Redmond and David Angus	Nic Phillips	10 January 1984
Zammo is waiting for Jackie to arrive, but Jeremy convinces Zammo he saw Jackie get in a car with an older man. A few moments later, Jackie appears and sees Zammo walking with Jeremy. Zammo and Jeremy are stopped on their way to school by the Brookdale lads who had seen Zammo with Jackie—who goes to Brookdale—and they tell Zammo to stay away from Jackie. Jeremy uses his fake bus pass and gets away with it. Annette bets with Fay and Julie she can wear eye makeup without being spotted—by wearing sunglasses and it actually convinces one teacher until she encounters Mrs. McClusky. Roland seems to be in the money, and starts lending it to others—with interest added. Jeremy uses his fake bus pass but then gets caught out by a bus inspector.
4	Episode Four	Phil Redmond and David Angus	Nic Phillips	13 January 1984
Jeremy has been suspended due to the fake bus pass. Fay feels hurt when her hockey teacher criticises her. Jackie gives Zammo strict instructions to stay clear of Brookdale bully Gluxo. Janet follows Roly home, nagging him about his weight whilst trying to find out what is up with him. Annette plans to enter a fashion competition by sending in photographs of herself and tells her friends that she is going to get them done professionally. However, she goes to a photo booth and does them. Mrs. McClusky calls Zammo to her office because she believes he has something to do with the fake bus-pass business.
5	Episode Five	Phil Redmond and David Angus	Nic Phillips	17 January 1984
Pogo's chain letter scam starts to lose interest as they do not feel as they are getting anything out of it. Pogo uses one of the computers to work out the chains. An epidemic of head lice sweeps the school. Pogo is getting grief from his unhappy customers, but Miss Lexington and Mr. Howard save his bacon—until he gets out to the playground. Final appearance: Miss Lexington
6	Episode Six	Phil Redmond and Barry Purchese	Carol Wilks	20 January 1984
Jeremy is being obnoxious when he returns from suspension. Annette has got a letter from the fashion competition, because she has made it through to the finals, but Miss Gordon tries to persuade her that modelling is a shallow career and will not give her the afternoon off to go. In biology, dissection of a rat is the order of the day, and some of the more squeamish members of class stay in the other room. Jeremy puts the dissected rat away into a cupboard afterwards and then puts Diane's bag in there, too. Diane screams and is allowed to go home but Annette uses this as an excuse to get out of school. She turns up for her modelling final—and finds a huge queue of girls waiting. At the pool, Jeremy seems determined to be as annoying as possible. The swimming teacher, Mr. Devereux, insists everyone stays out the water but no one listens and Annette's behaviour keeps Miss Hartley away. Jeremy throws Fay's bangle in the water and goes to retrieve it. The second time he does it, people assume he is showing off when he takes a long time at the bottom of the pool. The alarm is called and Mr. Devereux dives in and tries, with Mr. Baxter's help, to resuscitate Jeremy, but it is too late. Final appearance: Jeremy Irvine
7	Episode Seven	Phil Redmond and Frances Galleymore	David Bell	24 January 1984
N3 are struggling to come to terms with the shock Jeremy's death. Miss Gordon tries to reassure the class that it was his heart that gave out. Annette comes to school late, and seems calm and easy. Mr. Baxter offers his resignation because he feels responsible for Jeremy's death but Mrs. McClusky refuses to accept it. The United Nations weekend is looming, but Suzanne is unhappy to find she must wear school uniform. There have been fights with Brookdales again and more talk of merging the schools. Annette finally breaks down in tears when the reality of Jeremy's death sets in. Precious's hairdressing skills are put to the test on Christine.
8	Episode Eight	Phil Redmond and Margaret Simpson	TBA	27 January 1984
It is the weekend of the UN association's conference and Grange Hill are representing Tanzania. It does not take long for Stewpot and Duane to find female company. Pogo and Stewpot both show an interest in Trudy. Glenroy gets involved with other black kids and Suzanne finds herself left out. David Bellamy gives a speech on the World Food Problem and then the other countries have their say. Afterwards, Glenroy tells Claire she should "tell it like it is" rather than dressing up her speech with fancy words. Suzanne and Claire go off for lunch with the 'Russian' delegates. Featuring Gina Bellman as Trudy
9	Episode Nine	Phil Redmond and Margaret Simpson	TBA	31 January 1984
The UN association weekend continues and Claire has not turned up for the afternoon session because she is out with a boy who is from a public school. In a discussion about trade, Glenroy gets carried away on his rant about poverty, and Grange Hill's chance to talk is shortened. Glenroy is about to pack his bags and go, but is persuaded to stay. At the dinner dance, Claire waits for Guy whilst Stewpot waits for Trudy and then they find that their partners are an item. Fed-up Claire dances with upper-class twit John Eastlake, then runs off to her bedroom. Stewpot goes to find her, and persuades her to come back to the dance. Featuring Gina Bellman as Trudy
10	Episode Ten	Phil Redmond and Barry Purchese	Edward Pugh	3 February 1984
The girls have taken over the gym for gymnastic trials and Fay is fantastic at it. Sarah and Mandy are jealous of Fay and suggest that she prefers girls, especially Miss Gordon. This causes Fay a lot of upset and she runs away. Meanwhile, the boys run round the school to practice for the sponsored walk. Mr. Baxter finds them behind the bins and makes them do 10 laps. While running round the block, Zammo and Kevin read a newspaper headline that confirms that Grange Hill will merge with Brookdale and Rodney Bennet. Miss Gordon tells Fay that she has been selected for the gymnastic team and cannot understand her lack of enthusiasm.
11	Episode Eleven	Phil Redmond and Jane Hollowood	TBA	7 February 1984
Roland is taking bets on the participants of the sponsored walk. Stewpot asks Pogo to chat up Christine so can talk to Claire on her own. Jackie is walking with Zammo, but only just avoids meeting Gluxo. McClaren steals a butcher's boy's bike belonging to Gripper. Claire has a talk with Fay about the rumour of her having a crush on Miss Gordon and to put her at her ease talks about the time she used to write secret diaries about her and Mr. Hopwood. Pogo runs off during the middle of the walk when he spies his St. Mary's girlfriend, Lucinda. He takes her to a café, but she is more interested in eating cream cakes than talking to him. Zammo and Jackie come across a depressed Roland, and then McClaren turns up, hotly pursued by an angry Gripper. Everyone goes their separate ways—including McClaren, who has a dog on his trail. Guest appearance: Gripper Stebson
12	Episode Twelve	Phil Redmond and Barry Purchese	Nic Phillips	10 February 1984
Zammo has not given Gluxo's note to McClaren because Jackie has prevented him to get involved in the gang trouble. Suzanne feels she is growing out of school life and Mr. McGuffy sympathises with her situation but Mr. Smart's harsh attitude causes her to walk out of school. Roland's father tells Janet that Roland's mother has left them and tells her to leave. Grange Hill go to the gangfight arranged between them and Brookdale at a warehouse and await for them to turn up. Suddenly, the front doors slam shut and a note from Gluxo is pushed underneath—it tells them that they are trespassing on private property. The sound of police sirens are heard shortly after. Final appearance: Duane Orpington
13	Episode Thirteen	Phil Redmond and Barry Purchese	Nic Phillips	14 February 1984
Diane continues to talk about her boyfriend. Annette comes in happy with a new Polaroid camera and shows off about how much money her mum gives her. Janet nags Roland incessantly trying to find out more about his missing mother. Mrs. McClusky talks to her staff about the merger with Brookdale and Rodney Bennet. Annette is so upset about her missing camera that Julie relents and gives it back but Annette reacts violently. When Annette is getting changed, which she does only reluctantly, Julie notices she has bruises down her arms. The gym teacher also has noticed them and asks Annette about it privately, but she just claims she fell. Fay and Julie ask her about the bruises after the gym teacher leaves, the truth emerges as Annette explains that her mum hits her sometimes, when she is depressed.
14	Episode Fourteen	Phil Redmond and Frances Galleymore	Edward Pugh	17 February 1984
Mr. McGuffy teaches Diane's class drama. Miss Gordon's has a nude life model planned for the art class, but Mrs. McClusky might take some convincing. Diane has trouble keeping Mark up and fakes a photograph. She takes her mother's ring and claims it is an engagement ring from Mark. Diane's mum finds letters apparently from Mark, and is convinced Diane is up to no good, and forbids her to see Mark any more. After school, Diane seems to have been stood up by an imaginary Mark. When Diane goes home, she finds her mother has realised the truth. After a heart-to-heart, Diane hands back the borrowed ring. The following day, Diane is crying—her "boyfriend" has moved up north.
15	Episode Fifteen	Phil Redmond and Barry Purchese	Nic Phillips	21 February 1984
Julie and Fay talk about how Annette's mother hits her and they decide to speak to Miss Gordon. McClaren gets Roly to borrow a saw from metalwork and steal Annette's bike. Roland then takes it to the local second-hand shop, and sells it for twenty quid. Annette is found crying near her lost bike and Mr. Knowles calls the police. Meanwhile, Miss Gordon has gone round to Annette's mother to talk about Annette's physical abuse. Mrs. Firman breaks down and admits to hurting Annette and agrees that Annette should spend some time away from home. The next day, Annette is angry with Fay for telling Miss Gordon and they fight. Mr. Knowles breaks up the fight and takes them to Mrs. McClusky, who calms the situation, and tells her the bike has been found.
16	Episode Sixteen	Phil Redmond and Barry Purchese	Nic Phillips	24 February 1984
Mr. Knowles and Mr. Baxter have taken N3 to the countryside on an orienteering course. Everyone pairs off, but Roland finds himself with Mr. Baxter. Roland seems to be doing rather better at Orienteering than Mr. Baxter. Mandy and Sarah hide a control marker, which causes Roland and Mr. Baxter to get hopelessly lost. Mr. Baxter tries to climb a steep slope, but slips back and is incapacitated. Back at camp, there is growing concern at the missing pair, and a search party commences. Mr. Knowles tries and fails to find them and send everyone else back to the hostel, while a proper search and rescue is arranged. At the hostel, Sarah and Mandy admit they hid the control marker. As evening turns into night, things are looking awful but then Roland's whistle is heard. Mr. Baxter goes to hospital for an x-ray and Roland is given a hero's welcome back at the hostel.
17	Episode Seventeen	Phil Redmond and Jane Hollowood	TBA	28 February 1984
It is exam time at Grange Hill but Pogo is not worried because he has a job in double-glazing lined up. Stewpot panics in the first exam but Mrs. McClusky shakes some sense into him. The art club is fed up with drawing twigs and really want a real life model. They manage to talk Mrs. McClusky round, but just for the art club. Suzanne turns up in a Boy George outfit to meet her old classmates and talks to Mr. McGuffy about the difficulty of finding work. News of the nude model spreads to the likes of lecherous Pogo and Miss Gordon is surprised to find new recruits applying for the art club. Suzanne finds herself left out when she turns up to meet Claire and bursts into tears and tells her life outside school is not what she expected. She has an encouraging talk to Mr. McGuffy about college courses.
18	Episode Eighteen	Phil Redmond and Barry Purchese	Edward Pugh	2 March 1984
It is the end of term and tempers are getting frayed setting up a disco and Glenroy's enormous sound system that can only play reggae. In celebration of the merger with Rodney Bennet and Brookdale, some members of Rodney Bennet school are at Grange Hill. Zammo is pleased when Jackie turns up, but she tells him that two helpers behind the bar are not Rodney Bennet at all and they are from Brookdale. Suzanne turns up and is put to use trying to convince Glenroy to share the sound system. Mr. Baxter confronts the Brookdale kids when the takings seem low. McClaren works out that Gluxo has been receiving the money, and confronts him intent on emptying his pockets one way or the other. Annette blows her chance with the Rodney Bennet boy she fancies and Nigel is not having much luck. Mrs. McClusky dances with Mr. McGuffy while both Mr. Smart and Mr. Howard are dismayed when Miss Gordon chooses Mr. Knowles. Can Pogo's music work its magic for Claire and Stewpot? Final appearances: Mr. Keating, Mr. McGuffy, Pogo Patterson, Mr. Knowles, Suzanne Ross, Anita Unsworth, Glenroy, Rhandir Singh, Miss Gordon and more

== Release history ==
The seventh series of Grange Hill was released on DVD on 11 November 2019. This series includes English subtitles on all eighteen episodes on three discs, with format of 4:3 and total running time of 449 minutes (7 hours 29 minutes).

In 2021 the seventh series was released on the streaming platform BritBox.
