= Grange Hill series 6 =

Grange Hill
- Season 6
- No. of episodes: 18

Release
- Original network: BBC1
- Original release: 4 January – 4 March 1983

Season chronology
- ← Previous; Series 5 Next → Series 7

The sixth series of the British television drama series Grange Hill began broadcasting on 4 January 1983, before the ultimate ending on 4 March 1983 on BBC1. The series follows the lives of the staff and Students of the eponymous school, an inner-city London comprehensive school. It consists of eighteen episodes.

== Cast and characters ==
=== Students ===
- Peter Moran as Pogo Patterson
- Mark Baxter as Duane Orpington
- Joanne Boakes as Anita Unsworth
- Paula Ann Bland as Claire Scott
- Mark Burdis as Stewpot Stewart
- Dulice Liecier as Precious Matthews
- Susan Tully as Suzanne Ross
- Lisa East as Christine Everson
- Mark Savage as Gripper Stebson
- Julian Griffiths as Denny Rees
- Kaka Singh as Randir Singh
- Tony McPherson as Derick "Woody" Woods
- Steven Woodcock as Glenroy Glenroy
- Lee MacDonald as Zammo McGuire
- Erkan Mustafa as Roland Browning
- Alison Bettles as Fay Lucas
- Simone Nylander as Janet St. Clair
- Nadia Chambers as Annette Firman
- Terry Kinsella as Jimmy Flynn
- Lee Sparke as Jonah Jones
- Lisa York as Julie Marchant
- Julie-Ann Steel as Diane Cooney
- Anita Savage as Mandy Firth
- Joanne Bell as Sarah Wilks
- Vincent Matthews as Jeremy Irvine

=== Teachers ===
- Michael Cronin as Mr Geoff Baxter
- Robert Hartley as Mr Keating
- Brian Capron as Mr Stuart Hopwood
- Lucinda Gane as Miss Terri Mooney
- Susan Porrett as Mrs Hilary Thomas
- Gwyneth Powell as Mrs Bridget McClusky
- Allyson Rees as Miss Jenny Lexington
- Fraser Cains as Mr Bill McGuffey
- Simon Heywood as Mr Nick Smart
- Chris Jury as Mr Knowles
- Jennie Stoller as Miss Saunders
- Gillian Hanna as Mrs Gossage
- Gillian Hanna2 as Mrs Gossage2

== Episodes ==
No.	Episode	Writer	Director	Original airdate
1	Return	Barry Purchese	Carol Wilks	4 January 1983
The new term has begun, and a new batch of first years make a start at the school. Roland tries to stand up to Gripper with disastrous results. However, Roland's classmates are determined to do something about Gripper – especially when he assaults Pogo. Meanwhile, Pogo's selling cheap pens, Jonah falls foul of the pompous new teacher Mr. Smart, and Claire discovers Gripper is attracted to her. First Appearances: Randir Singh, Julie Marchant and Mr Nick Smart
2	New Faces	Barry Purchese	Carol Wilks	7 January 1983
Following his clash with rival school Rodney Bennett, Zammo teams up with Jonah's cousin, Jeremy, a Rodney Bennett Student to infiltrate the school and gain revenge on the boys who have stolen from him. Meanwhile, Annette is jealous of Fay's expertise in hockey, and her new friendship with Julie, so she steals Fay's hockey stick and frames Julie. Diane, who suffers from skin problems arrives at Grange Hill, only to be victimised by two bullies. First Appearances: Sarah Wilks, Mandy Firth, Diane Cooney
3	Choices	Jane Hollowood	Edward Pugh	11 January 1983
Randir, a Sikh, makes a start at Grange Hill, and wants to try for the football team, but his father would prefer he helps in the shop on Saturday. As he attempts to make friends, Randir is subjected to racial abuse by Gripper, leading to a conflict between Grange Hill and Gripper's henchmen. Meanwhile, Claire continues to fight off the advances of Gripper, and Suzanne's new look gets her into trouble with Mrs McClusky. First Appearance: Derick 'Woody' Woods
4	Thuggies	Jane Hollowood	Alistair Clarke	14 January 1983
Gripper's dogged hounding of Randir causes him to align himself with Woody. Pogo asks Randir to show him how to put on a turban, but Gripper arrives and makes it clear that life is going to be tough for any "foreigners", leading to a confrontation between Gripper and Woody. Meanwhile, chaos ensures when lunch breaks are reduced to 40 minutes. Duane and Stewpot battle for Claire's attention.
5	On Trial	Margaret Simpson	Carol Wilks	18 January 1983
Jeremy, Zammo and Jonah convene for another attempt at infiltrating Rodney Bennett for a laugh. At Rodney Bennett School, Zammo and Jonah get lost, and there is no sign of Jeremy. They find him in a maths lesson, but the rest of the class rumbles their presence. Meanwhile, Miss Mooney pairs off Roland, whose troubles with Gripper have returned, with Diane, much to their mutual disgust.
6	Field Trip	Margaret Simpson	TBA	21 January 1983
Grange Hill are on a school trip to St Albans and Annette becomes tired of Diane's superior local knowledge, leading Annette to fall out with Diane. Diane then storms off on her own. Zammo buys a guide on the history of St Albans so he doesn't have to do any work. Boys in a car take Julie's crisps and they later approach Annette and Julie and they get into the car - they both realise the car is not taking them to the Roman theatre. Meanwhile, Roly is in the cafe eating and sees some older, local people talking so records their conversation. Jonah wins a lot of money on the fruit machines. Later, they are all reunited and Zammo and Jonah lie about finding the history of the town when Mr Butterworth buys an identical guide.
7	Love Triangle	Margaret Simpson	Carol Wilks	25 January 1983
Suzanne's mum walks Suzanne to school to make sure she does not bunk off, however she tries to leave in registration before Mr Hopwood arrives. Unfortunately, Mr Hopwood catches her. Stewpot writes Claire's name on his hand and when she finds out, she is not amused by it. Gripper's racist attitude becomes worse when he tries to get the white kids in the school to agree to an oath. He tries to get Stewpot to agree, but he refuses and as soon as Gripper starts beating Stewpot up, he is interrupted by Mr Hopwood. When Gripper crumples up Precious' map because she will not leave a table, she has had it and stands up to Gripper, who finally moves.
8	Weightwatchers	David Angus	Alistair Clarke	28 January 1983
Zammo and Jonah bring in a monkey mask. Roland accuses Annette of bullying him about his weight. When Annette is confronted by Mrs McClusky and Miss Mooney, Annette tells them that Roland has been picking on Diane about her spots. Fay also is worried about Diane's weight. Julie also goes round every member of staff to see how many qualifications they have. When she asks Mr Smart, she accidentally drops all her notes and he insists on telling her about his career after school.
9	Open Day	Paula Milne	Alistair Clarke	1 February 1983
Open Day is approaching at Grange Hill and the Students have to create a project. Zammo and Jonah are doing a project of measurement using the computer - which contains the aspect of gambling. Gripper wanted to make wooden guns for his project, but instead he is asked to carve something. Glenroy's Rasta project is successful, until Gripper sabotages it. Miss Mooney tells Zammo's mother that her son seems to be operating on flexi-time. Suzanne is happy when Mr. Hopwood is trying to get her onto media studies, however, she finds out someone dropped out - so Mr Hopwood did nothing.
10	An Inspector Calls	Margaret Simpson	Alistair Clarke	4 February 1983
Mr Knowles, a new teacher, is put to the test with N2 and they cause havoc for him until Mr Smart appears. Fay, Julie and Annette follow Mr Knowles to the shop at lunch for their own amusement. Jonah has plans for flexi-time, but at the school council meeting, all the teachers are against it due to the inconvenience it would cause with the timetable. Zammo overhears Mrs McClusky saying that Mr Knowles is being inspected, so he alerts the rest of his class who agree to behave because they actually like him. When the inspector comes, N2 are well behaved, and Mr Knowles cannot believe it! First appearance: Mr Knowles
11	Paper Chase	David Angus	Carol Wilks	8 February 1983
Pogo's maths book is ruined and he tells Mr Keating it is in that state because he dropped it in the bath. However, Pogo does not get another maths book. The school magazine is currently banned, but Suzanne has plans to create her own. Meanwhile, Pogo finds that there is a market for school exercise books. He finds that there is another entry into the stationery room via the toilets. Suzanne tries to get paper from the photocopier for her magazine but fails to get past Miss Mooney. She and Claire burst in on Pogo, who is in the girls' toilets, and Suzanne climbs through the hole in the wall and says to Claire that there is enough paper to keep the magazine going for a whole year!
12	Publication	Margaret Simpson	Carol Wilks	11 February 1983
Suzanne and Claire are close to producing the first edition of their magazine, but are stumped with finding a way they can print it. In the boy's toilets, Gripper decides to soak some first years and is later surprised by a response and a fight breaks out. Mr Hopwood tries to break up the fight and calls for Mr. Baxter and Mr Keating. All the boys involved are given a two-week suspension. Suzanne and Claire print out the first issue of the school magazine. Claire and Stewpot are caught necking in a cupboard, and it is the last straw for Mrs. McClusky, who has just read the magazine and suspends Claire and Stewpot.
13	Backlash	Barry Purchese	Alistair Clarke	15 February 1983
Denny Rees is labelled "Igor" since Gripper is suspended, and he is derided by his classmates. Claire's mother talks to Stewpot's father while waiting to see Mrs. McClusky. Denny speaks to Mr. McGuffey about his position as Gripper's sidekick, and how he would like to start again. Suzanne and Claire want to publish a second issue of their magazine but need someone to get more paper. Mr McGuffy asks the girls if they would forgive Denny Rees. Claire and Suzanne take the opportunity of making Denny do their dirty work and get the paper Mrs. McClusky catches Denny on the steps, picking up the paper after his bag splits, but it is Mr McGuffey that Mrs McClusky is after, and she is convinced he is involved.
14	Repercussions	Barry Purchese	Alistair Clarke	18 February 1983
Gripper is back from suspension and Mrs McClusky meets with Mr McGuffey about his involvement in the school magazine and Mrs McClusky suspends him. Gripper and his gang corner Randir in the toilets, but Mr Baxter hears them from down the corridor, barges in and gives Gripper a dunking in the basin following another racist comment from Gripper. Mrs. McClusky goes ahead with a referendum on flexitime and tells Mr Keating the idea would have to go through the governors. Claire comes face to face with Gripper, who is not happy about the magazine article she wrote. Stewpot alerts the others, but it is too late to stop Claire getting a face-full of mop. Pogo leads them all to Gripper, but Mr. Baxter interrupts again and makes sure that he will get Gripper expelled. Final Appearance: Gripper Stebson (as a series regular), Derick "Woody" Woods and Denny Rees
15	Outward Bound – Part 1	Jane Hollowood	TBA	22 February 1983
N2 are off for an outward-bound course in Wales. When they arrive, Mr Baxter and Miss Mooney are shocked to discover that the kids will be calling them by their first names (Geoff and Terri). They are even more shocked when they have to join in with the activities. Fay turns out to be excellent at climbing, but Roly struggles on the first wall-climbing exercise. When they have to do the tunnel activity, Roly sneaks off and covers himself in dirt. Roly is scared when he apparently gets chased by bulls. He meets a farmer who catches him and tells him they are cows. Roly learns some Welsh and about agriculture while he is there. When Roly makes his way back he is caught by Mr. Baxter, who is surprised by Roly's sudden knowledge of cattle breeds. Diane gets more grief about her spots, and becomes even more isolated. In the boys' dormitory, a bucket of water is placed over the door to soak Mr. Baxter. Roly falls off the bunk and sprains his ankle.
16	Outward Bound – Part 2	Jane Hollowood	TBA	25 February 1983
It is the last day of the trip for class N2. Fay and Annette are worried about Diane's lack of appetite. Roland has hurt his foot and is happy to stay back in the kitchen baking bread. Diane finds she is better at canoeing than she thought. The other half of the class are zip-wiring. The kids cheer Mr. Baxter on to do it, but he nearly chickens out. Zammo almost drowns when his canoe turns over, but Diane alerts the staff. There is a final barn dance and Roly receives a Welsh dictionary from Mr Price, the farmer, and Mr Baxter gets a dance from Miss Mooney. Mr Baxter tells the kids that when they are back at school, he will be called Sir or Mr Baxter, not Geoff.
17	Sympathy	Barry Purchese	Edward Pugh	1 March 1983
Slogans are everywhere in the school saying "We Want Scruffy" to try to bring him back. Fay tries to reassure Diane about her spots and Annette, who says she may need to wear a brace by saying "It's better than being blind innit!" Also, it is the day of the referendum to vote in favour of or against the idea of flexitime. Mr. Hopwood tries to sell the idea of the importance of the fourth year's exams, but Suzanne raises the point that there is no need since there will not be any jobs after they leave. Claire has plans for another magazine issue on "Scruffy" McGuffey. Jonah spins Fay round in delight when the result of the referendum is a yes. Fay falls to the ground, hurting her ankle and Annette and Diane point out "It's better than being blind innit!".
18	Rally	Barry Purchese	TBA	4 March 1983
A rally is being organised by the Students to bring back Mr McGuffey and posters and banners are being painted in secret. Mrs McClusky reinstated Mr. McGuffey - without telling the Students. Jonah ruins the banner he was working on by making the letters too big. However, there is a more major issue - the main school doors are locked. Jonah comes up with an idea to open the school. Jonah hides aboard a milk float and gains entry into the school while the staff are patrolling the school gates. When the staff see the kids approach from one end of the road, the teachers go to that gate. However, another set of kids enter by the other entrance. Jonah lets in the "Scruffy" protesters. Mrs. McClusky plays her trump card - the appearance of Mr. McGuffey. Claire and Suzanne are devastated that they went ahead with the protest when they learn he was reinstated the previous day. Final appearance: Mr "Hoppy" Hopwood, Miss Terri Mooney, Gordon 'Jonah' Jones

== Release history ==
The sixth series of Grange Hill was released by Eureka Entertainment on 19 November 2018. This series includes English subtitles on all 18 episodes on three DVD discs, with format of 4:3 and total running time of 451 mins. (7hrs 31min)

In 2021 the sixth series was released on the streaming platform BritBox. The opening scene from episode one featured music and radio chatter was initially cut from the dvd release. This has been fully reinstated on BritBox.
