= Bring Back... =

British television series

- Presented by: Justin Lee Collins
- Countries of origin: United Kingdom, The Chatterbox Partnership
- Original language: English
- No. of episodes: 8

Production
- Running time: 1–2 hours each
- Production company: So Television

Original release
- Network: Channel 4
- Release: 10 May 2005 – 9 May 2009

Bring Back... is a British television series comprising one-off shows where Justin Lee Collins tries to locate people from music, TV, or film backgrounds to reunite them for a one-off performance or get-together. The series was broadcast on Channel 4.

== Bring Back... Grange Hill ==
Transmitted: 10 May 2005

Collins looks back at the successful television series Grange Hill and in particular its anti-drugs campaign in 1986 which led to the production of the pop record "Just Say No". He tries to track down the original actors in the show at the time and reunite them for a one-off performance of the song. Justin has a problem in that he has just 10 days to trace them, but many have abandoned their acting careers altogether and are reluctant to relive their brush with adolescent stardom. However, he did manage to track down and interview:

- Alison Bettles - Fay Lucas
- George Christopher - Ziggy Greaves
- Mmoloki Chrystie - Kevin Baylon
- Lee MacDonald - Zammo McGuire
- Erkan Mustafa - Roland Browning

Only Bettles, MacDonald, Christopher and Mustafa arrived to sing their 80s hit at the Hammersmith Palais, but they were joined on stage by other former cast members who were not interviewed, among them was Mark Savage who played 'Gripper' Stebson.

Despite the title, Grange Hill was still airing at the time the show aired. On 15 September 2008 Grange Hill finally came to an end after 30 years.

== Bring Back... The Christmas Number One ==
Transmitted: 10 December 2005

Collins attempts to make a Christmas-themed song to the Christmas number one single slot - a feat not accomplished since Cliff Richard's "Saviour's Day" in 1990, excluding the re-recorded version of the 1984 song "Do They Know It's Christmas?" by Band Aid 20 in 2004.

In the end, they produced the song "I'm Goin' Home", featuring the following musicians:

- David Essex (vocals)
- Mud's Rob Davis (guitar)
- Slade's Dave Hill (guitar)
- Slade's Don Powell (drums)
- Jona Lewie (piano)
- Mud's Dave Mount (drums)
- Showaddywaddy (backing vocals)
- Justin Lee Collins (backing vocals and sleigh bells)

Liz Mitchell of Boney M and Aled Jones expressed interest in the project, but were ultimately unable to attend.

The song was to be released so it could compete to be Christmas number 1 but the record company axed the release. However, it was available for download from the Channel 4 website where it reached number 1 in the site's download chart.

== Bring Back... The A-Team ==
Transmitted: 18 May 2006

Justin attempts to reunite the cast of his favourite show as a child, The A-Team. He has to secure interviews and appearances with the stars of the show who have not spoken to each other for some time. Justin met with the people below to discuss the show and asked them to attend a reunion. All but Mr. T made it to the meeting, which took place at the Friars Club of Beverly Hills.

- Dirk Benedict - Templeton "Faceman" Peck
- Dwight Schultz - H.M. "Howling Mad" Murdock
- Marla Heasley - Tawnia Baker
- Jack Ging - General Harlan "Bull" Fullbright
- Mr. T - B.A. Baracus
- Stephen J. Cannell - series co-creator

The people below, although not interviewed by Justin, appeared at the meeting.

- William Lucking - Colonel Lynch
- Lance LeGault - Colonel Roderick Decker
- Christian Peppard - Representing his late father George Peppard

Justin uses unorthodox methods, such as ambushing the actors in their homes, hotel rooms, or even while out shopping, without any prior warning and, for Mr. T, attempting to gatecrash his way into the Latin Grammy Awards.

During every interview, Collins would inquire about the rumored tension between Peppard and Mr T. Although Peppard was an established star of Hollywood movies, Mr. T was relatively new to on-screen acting yet, in a short time, he was generally regarded as the main star of the show. It was suggested that tension did indeed exist between the two and was most probably due to Peppard's bitterness of Mr. T's status in the show. During the interview with Mr. T, the trademark gold chains worn by his character were discussed. Mr. T stated that they were symbolic of the iron chains of his African slave-ancestors but made from gold because he thinks of himself as being a 'slave' except with a higher price now. As a joke, a medium attempted to contact the deceased George Peppard via seance.

The episode excludes any mention of the fifth season, and actors Eddie Velez and Robert Vaughn, who had joined the cast for that season only, were likewise not interviewed. Instead, the finale of the fourth season, in which Jack Ging's character (General Fullbright) is shot and killed, is referred to as the series' final episode.

== Bring Back... One Hit Wonders ==
Transmitted: 9 June 2006

Collins attempts to reunite former pop artists from past decades who have only had one big, well known hit, to play at a one-off gig. He interviewed:

- Joe Dolce
- Renato Pagliari of the duo Renée and Renato
- Clive Jackson of Doctor and the Medics
- Carl Douglas
- Mary Sandeman aka Aneka

Only Pagliari, Jackson and Douglas turned up to perform their hits at the Clapham Grand, London.

== Bring Back... Dallas ==
Transmitted: 27 May 2007

Collins tries to track down the retired stars of Dallas and reunite them at his Oil Barons Ball. Only Eric Farlow, the first actor to play Baby Christopher in the show, arrived, much to Collins' delight. By the end of the show he managed to find and interview

- Mary Crosby - Kristin Shepard
- Patrick Duffy - Bobby Ewing
- Linda Gray - Sue Ellen Ewing
- Larry Hagman - J.R. Ewing
- Susan Howard - Donna Culver Krebbs
- Ken Kercheval - Cliff Barnes
- Charlene Tilton - Lucy Ewing
- Eric Farlow - Baby Christopher (not originally interviewed)

Dallas was revived in 2012; the new version would be produced until 2014.

== Bring Back... Star Wars ==
Transmitted: 14 September 2008

Collins attempts to reunite the stars of the original Star Wars trilogy. He was unable to secure a meeting with Harrison Ford (Han Solo). He was offered an interview with Mark Hamill (Luke Skywalker) for $50,000; after raising several thousand dollars, Collins was unable to negotiate the price any lower, and was forced to abandon any hopes of meeting Hamill. Collins did, however, succeed in securing interviews, through a combination of deception and surprise attacks, with the following:

Justin Lee Collins and Warwick Davis' "climactic" lightsaber duel.

- Carrie Fisher - Princess Leia
- Anthony Daniels - C-3PO
- Kenny Baker - R2-D2
- Peter Mayhew - Chewbacca
- Jeremy Bulloch - Boba Fett
- David Prowse - Darth Vader
- Billy Dee Williams - Lando Calrissian
- Warwick Davis - Wicket

Of these, only Bulloch, Davis, Baker and Prowse were able to attend the reunion in London. Daniels called to say he could not attend. Fisher recorded a humorous video message to be played as a holographic message, akin to the one in the original Star Wars film. Mayhew and Williams also made short video clips to be played similarly, albeit without audio. Justin had a lightsaber battle with Davis in which Davis was the victor.

== Bring Back... Fame ==
Justin Lee Collins with Erica Gimpel.

Transmitted: 27 December 2008

Lee Collins attempts to reunite the cast of the vintage television show. He travels to America to track down some of the surviving members of the hit movie and spin-off TV show, Fame. He successfully tracked down:

- Irene Cara - Coco Hernandez (film)
- Erica Gimpel - Coco Hernandez (TV)
- Carlo Imperato - Danny Amatullo
- Valerie Landsburg - Doris Schwartz
- Lee Curreri - Bruno Martelli
- Carol Mayo Jenkins - Elizabeth Sherwood
- Debbie Allen - Lydia Grant

Of those, Gimpel, Imperato, Landsburg, Curreri, Jenkins and Allen turned up for the street dance reunion that was arranged by Lee Collins. During the show he also talks to the mother of Gene Anthony Ray who played "Leroy" in both the film and television series. Ray had died in 2003 from a stroke.

== Bring Back... Star Trek ==
Justin Lee Collins recreates the Gorn battle scene with Bobby Clark.

Transmitted: 9 May 2009

Collins attempts to track down the cast of the original Star Trek series (except for DeForest Kelley, who died in 1999, and James Doohan, who died in 2005), hoping to recreate the scene from the episode "Arena" in which Captain Kirk battles a Gorn. Despite his best efforts he was unable to interview William Shatner. None of the cast attended the planned reunion, but he was able to create a scene on his own bridge of the USS Collins, JLC-1702, using footage filmed during interviews with Takei, Nichols and Koenig. Bobby Clark put on a version of the Gorn outfit in order to recreate the battle scene with Collins standing in for Shatner. He succeeded in tracking down:

- George Takei - Hikaru Sulu
- Grace Lee Whitney - Janice Rand
- Nichelle Nichols - Nyota Uhura
- Walter Koenig - Pavel Chekov
- Eddie Paskey - Lieutenant Leslie
- Bobby Clark - Gorn
- Leonard Nimoy - Spock

== Bring Back... The Goonies ==
Collins had intended to reunite the cast of the 1985 film The Goonies, however, owing to poor ratings for Bring Back...Star Trek, Channel 4 cancelled the series.
