= List of Press Gang episodes =

This is a list of television episodes from the British television show Press Gang. Press Gang was produced by Richmond Film & Television for Central, and screened on the ITV network in its regular weekday afternoon children's strand, Children's ITV. All 43 episodes across five series were written by Steven Moffat. The first episode was transmitted on 16 January 1989, and the final transmitted on 21 May 1993. The show gained an adult audience in an early evening slot when repeated on Sundays on Channel 4.

The show was based on the activities of the staff of the Junior Gazette, a children's newspaper initially produced by pupils from the local comprehensive school. The main story arc was the on-off romance between the newspaper's editor Lynda Day (Julia Sawalha) and Spike Thomson (Dexter Fletcher). The other main characters were assistant editor Kenny Phillips (Lee Ross), Sarah Jackson (Kelda Holmes), the paper's enterprising accountant Colin Mathews (Paul Reynolds) and Frazz Davies (Mmoloki Chrystie).

In June 2007, The Stage reported that Moffat and Sawalha are interested in reviving Press Gang. He said: "I would revive that like a shot. I would love to do a reunion episode—a grown-up version. I know Julia Sawalha is interested—every time I see her she asks me when we are going to do it. Maybe it will happen—I would like it to."

== Series overview ==
Series	Episodes	Originally released	
Series	Episodes	First released	Last released
1	12	16 January 1989	10 April 1989
2	13	18 January 1990	12 April 1990
3	6	7 May 1991	11 June 1991
4	6	7 January 1992	11 February 1992
5	6	16 April 1993	21 May 1993

== Episodes ==
=== Series 1 (1989) ===
Most of the episodes in the first and second series had closing voice-overs featuring typically two characters. These are noted with each episode synopsis. The voice-overs were dropped for the third series onwards, as Moffat felt they were not working as well any more. Producer Sandra C. Hastie recalls that Moffat was "extremely angry" that Drop the Dead Donkey had adopted the style.

The first series established the characters and the style of the series. The first two episodes were directed by Colin Nutley. However, he was unhappy with the final edit and requested that his name be removed from the credits. Bob Spiers, who writer Moffat credits as setting the visual style, made his Press Gang directorial debut with "One Easy Lesson".

The show addressed its first serious issue in the two part story "How to Make a Killing", in which the team expose shopkeepers who sell solvents to underage customers. The penultimate episode, "Monday-Tuesday", sees a character commit suicide after being rejected from the writing team and told some home truths by Lynda. However, the series also features many comedic elements, some of which are referred to in later years. Colin's inadvertent attendance at a funeral dressed as a pink rabbit in "A Night In" is referenced in "Something Terrible: Part 2".

No. overall	No. in series	Title	Directed by	Written by	Original release date
1	1	"Page One"	Colin Nutley (uncredited)	Steven Moffat	16 January 1989
The Junior Gazette is fast approaching its first edition and the team are still desperate for a lead story. American delinquent James "Spike" Thomson is forced to work on the paper, but immediately clashes with editor Lynda Day, whom he can't help but be attracted to. It looks like they have their lead story when a Mr Vader tells them of government plans which could endanger children all over the world. Spike, however, has found an alternative story.
2	2	"Photo Finish"	Colin Nutley (uncredited)	Steven Moffat	23 January 1989
Linda reluctantly agrees that Spike's story about a popular local club possibly being closed down to make way for a supermarket is the big opening headline that the Junior Gazette needs, but she is determined to get the big scoop before him. Meanwhile, Colin has had a phone put in using the main Gazette's line - much to the anger of Linda.
3	3	"One Easy Lesson"	Bob Spiers	Steven Moffat	30 January 1989
Sarah is concerned about the school's new English teacher, Simon Knowles (Adrian Edmondson), who struggles to control his classes. The others are in the dark about her concern until they learn that she is his cousin. When they discover that Mr. Knowles may lose his job, the Junior Gazette team come up with a plan to try to save his career. Meanwhile, Colin buys 100,000 defective half ping-pong balls, and sells them as 'pings'.
4	4	"Deadline."	Bob Spiers	Steven Moffat	6 February 1989
When a printers strike hits the main Gazette, Lynda strikes a deal to have a limited run of the Junior Gazette printed. There is one problem: they must try and predict next week's news before it happens.
5	5	"A Night In"	Lorne Magory	Steven Moffat	13 February 1989
Spike is angry when Lynda orders him to take the Saturday evening shift working on the paper. Tiddler observes as the drama between Lynda, Spike and Kenny unfolds through the evening. Meanwhile, Colin has an important business meeting - but does not realise that he is dressed in a pink rabbit costume.
6	6	"Interface"	Bob Spiers	Steven Moffat	20 February 1989
Lynda becomes suspicious when the team suddenly win a writing competition and are given a computer as a prize. Her curiosity grows when they start receiving well-written anonymous contributions to the newspaper. They decide to make a big selling point of the mystery writer - but Lynda is determined to discover their true identity.
7	7	"How to Make a Killing (Part 1)"	Lorne Magory	Steven Moffat	27 February 1989
On the 15th of each month, the outline of a dead body is drawn outside a block of high rise flats, from where several years earlier a boy had fallen to his death. Kenny convinces Lynda to let him investigate, thinking there could be a big story. He manages to trace the girl (Sadie Frost) behind the mystery drawings, but starts to become closer to her than simply looking into a story.
8	8	"How to Make a Killing (Part 2)"	Lorne Magory	Steven Moffat	6 March 1989
With Kenny AWOL, Lynda assigns Spike as temporary assistant editor. But when Kenny returns, with the solution to the circumstances in which Jenny's brother died, the Junior Gazette team find themselves on top of a very big story - local shops selling solvents to underage users.
9	9	"Both Sides of the Paper"	Bob Spiers	Steven Moffat	13 March 1989
The mock exams are a fortnight away. Sarah in particular is feeling the strains and pressure of the heavy workload. Naturally, Colin is trying to cash in with his latest money-making scheme. Lynda struggles to find a way around the headmaster's (David Collings) attempts to close the paper for the exam period, from which it would financially be unable to restart. But a visiting radio correspondent, the "Phone Ranger", makes Lynda an offer that she might not be able to refuse.
10	10	"Money, Love and Birdseed"	Lorne Magory	Steven Moffat	20 March 1989
Bobby Tweed, a school thug, is accused of stealing £30 from the judo club. Sarah is certain that he is guilty, while Billy believes that he did not do it, so Lynda assigns them both to work on the story. Meanwhile, in the newsroom, which is overrun with pigeons, Tiddler tries her hand at match-making between Lynda and Spike.
11	11	"Monday - Tuesday"	Bob Spiers	Steven Moffat	3 April 1989
This story flips back between the events of yesterday (Monday) and the present (Tuesday), as the Junior Gazette staff try to work out what led from a disliked rich boy, David Jefford (Alex Crockatt), attempting to blackmail Lynda into promoting him on the writing team, to a terrible event. It is set against the more light-hearted backdrop of Colin trying to get Spike's help in asking out a girl he fancies. Moffat used the name "David Jefford" again in his 1997 sitcom Chalk to refer to an off-screen pupil. It is implied, though, that the two characters are different, since the latter is still alive.
12	12	"Shouldn't I Be Taller?"	Bob Spiers	Steven Moffat	10 April 1989
After resigning from the Junior Gazette through guilt for David's suicide, Lynda has gone away to spend some time by herself. In her absence, Colin beats a reluctant Kenny in the election for the new editor, and revamps the paper (now called The Gaz), and the newsroom. Spike desperately searches for Lynda to try to convince her to come back.

=== Series 2 (1990) ===
Moffat was impressed with Lucy Benjamin's performance as Julie, and expanded her character for the second series. However she had committed herself to roles in the LWT sitcom Close to Home and Jupiter Moon, so the character was replaced by Sam Black (Gabrielle Anwar). The replacement occurred so close to the start of production that Sam was basically the character of Julie under a different name, especially in her earlier episodes.

No. overall	No. in series	Title	Directed by	Written by	Original release date
13	1	"Breakfast at Czar's"	Bob Spiers; Gerry O'Hara (uncredited) directed some sequences with the adults.	Steven Moffat	18 January 1990
After the Junior Gazette celebrate printing a big edition announcing how they have saved the local community centre from closure, it emerges that it is set for closure after all. Lynda orders a whole new edition to be produced overnight to replace the scrapped edition - much to the anger of the parents and the school. Spike shows off his new girlfriend to make Lynda jealous.
14	2	"Picking Up the Pieces"	Gerry O'Hara	Steven Moffat	25 January 1990
Colin sets his money-making sights on Suzy Norton (Abigail Docherty), a brilliant schoolgirl chessplayer, by persuading her to take part in a grand tournament against Frazz. One drawback - Frazz can't actually play chess! Elsewhere, after Spike is excluded from school and risks his place on the Junior Gazette when he beats up a sixth former for writing something on the common room wall, Lynda goes all-out to provide his defence. Later in the series, Abigail Docherty performed the voice for the character of Mary Brien in the episode "The Rest of My Life".
15	3	"Going Back to Jasper Street"	Bren Simson	Steven Moffat	1 February 1990
Lynda has flashbacks to ten years previously when a sinister carved wooden figure gives her nightmares. As a young girl, she had run away from her mother on Kenny's birthday, and in the present, she has a feeling that there is a promise that she had made that she has forgotten about. Meanwhile, Ruby Grogan has an unrequited crush on Spike - much to the annoyance of Colin, who has designs on her.
16	4	"The Week and Pizza"	Bren Simson	Steven Moffat	8 February 1990
Colin is in trouble with Lynda over the Junior Gazette accounts, and tries to find something to blackmail her with. Spike and Tiddler are assigned to interview grouchy local children's author (Barbara Hicks). Sam, and then Kenny, find it hard to tell a member of the newsteam that she is fired.
17	5	"Love and the Junior Gazette"	Bob Spiers	Steven Moffat	15 February 1990
Kenny keeps getting a mis-routed line when phoning his aunt in Glasgow and strikes up a friendship with a girl in Dublin. Raymond Adams (Atlay Lawrence), a local amateur actor that Sam fancies, sets his sights on a nervous Sarah, who is about to publish her scathing review of his performance in An Inspector Calls. Matt Kerr has decided that Lynda should go with Spike to an important cocktail party hosted by the owner of the newspaper.
18	6	"At Last a Dragon"	Bob Spiers	Steven Moffat	22 February 1990
Lynda and Spike go on their first "date" together, to the cocktail party hosted by the paper's wealthy and influential owner, Cameron Campbell. Lynda is very nervous, and Spike sees that she isn't all as headstrong as she makes out to be.
19	7	"Something Terrible (Part 1)"	Bob Spiers	Steven Moffat	1 March 1990
While Lynda goes out of her way to try to keep her relationship with Spike a secret, oblivious to the fact that everyone knows about it, an eleven-year-old girl called Cindy Watkins makes herself known to Colin by claiming to a local thug that he is her brother. As Colin finds out more about the elusive Cindy, he begins to get the feeling that she is trying to tell him something terrible.
20	8	"Something Terrible (Part 2)"	Bob Spiers	Steven Moffat	8 March 1990
Colin tries helplessly to do something to stop Cindy's father from sexually abusing her, but his efforts come to nothing with everyone thinking he is just up to his latest scheme, until Lynda of all people offers to help, producing a special edition of the Junior Gazette dealing with child abuse. Writer Moffat says that Press Gang's issue-led episodes served to develop the main characters, so that "Something Terrible" is more "about Colin's redemption [from selfish capitalist], rather than Cindy's abuse."
21	9	"Friends Like These"	John Hall	Steven Moffat	15 March 1990
Sarah finally plucks up the courage to tell Lynda that she is leaving the Junior Gazette to take an evening writing class. The team try to delay pop star Jason Wood (Suggs) at the local train station whilst Lynda persuades Sarah to interview him.
22	10	"The Rest of My Life"	Bob Spiers	Steven Moffat	22 March 1990
There has been a huge explosion at a local block of flats which has a busy record shop underneath. Lynda motivates the team into hurrying to report the breaking news, until she notices that Spike is not present. Lying amongst the rubble, Spike talks to a girl called Mary Brien (Abigail Docherty), buried deeper below the debris and badly injured.
23	11	"Yesterday's News"	Lorne Magory	Steven Moffat	29 March 1990
When Spike returns to the Junior Gazette, a feud develops between him and Lynda. Lynda challenges them to compete, to be the first one to get the big scoop on a story about a local company using food past its sell by date. But Spike is more deeply affected by his experience in the gas blast than he's willing to let on, and could have permanent consequences for his relationship with Lynda.
24	12	"Rock Solid"	Bob Spiers	Steven Moffat	5 April 1990
Kenny is oiling the running of the paper even more than usual in the wake of Spike quitting, leaving Lynda even more difficult than usual. But Colin has discovered that Kenny is an aspiring singer and guitarist, and has big plans for him, whether Kenny likes it or not.
25	13	"The Big Finish?"	Bob Spiers	Steven Moffat	12 April 1990
When Brian Magboy (Simon Schatzberger) arrives with news that the team could be replaced, it looks as if things may never be the same again at the Junior Gazette. Things are set to come to a head on the day of Kenny's big concert lined up, Spike is set to return to America unless Lynda tells him that she loves him, and Lynda awaits news about the Junior Gazette's future.

=== Series 3 (1991) ===
The Junior Gazette is now running commercially, although still under the main Gazette and still having to answer to Matt Kerr. Paul Cornell praises the continuity in this series, beginning with Lynda hiccuping in "The Big Hello", a reference to "At Last a Dragon". The same actress (Aisling Flitton) who played a wrong number in "Love and the Junior Gazette" reprised her character for "Chance is a Fine Thing". "Attention to detail" such as this is, according to Cornell, "one of the numerous ways that the series respects the intelligence of its viewers."

No. overall	No. in series	Title	Directed by	Written by	Original release date
26	1	"The Big Hello"	Bob Spiers	Steven Moffat	7 May 1991
Lynda is investigating a crooked but influential property developer - which sees her by chance bumping into Spike, who has not announced to anyone that he is on a visit back from America, and has his new girlfriend, Zoe, in tow. Lynda and Spike end up working on the story together, but the investigation could land Lynda in deep trouble and cost her the editorship of the Junior Gazette.
27	2	"Killer on the Line"	Lorne Magory	Steven Moffat	14 May 1991
As Spike searches the newsroom for his passport, Sarah receives a number of phone calls from a desperate young man (Jake Wood) trapped in a newsagents.
28	3	"Chance Is a Fine Thing"	Bob Spiers	Steven Moffat	21 May 1991
When he finds an old unread letter underneath a floorboard intended for his grandfather, Kenny begins thinking about chance and the wrong number in Dublin. Colin takes the new girl, Judy (Claire Forlani), out on a date. Her boyfriend, Clark Kent (Tim Dutton), however, is unimpressed.
29	4	"The Last Word (Part 1)"	Lorne Magory	Steven Moffat	28 May 1991
Television news reports that a member of the Junior Gazette team has been killed during a siege. In the story, told in flashback, a gun enthusiast (Christien Anholt) had taken exception to a story that the paper printed about gun control. Disguised in a clown mask, he takes the team hostage.
30	5	"The Last Word (Part 2)"	Lorne Magory	Steven Moffat	4 June 1991
The siege continues. The team attend the funeral of a member of the Junior Gazette, where Detective Inspector Hibbert (Hugh Quarshie) delivers the eulogy about their friend.
31	6	"Holding On"	Bob Spiers	Steven Moffat	11 June 1991
Spike and Lynda are unable to let go of each other's hands after being hypnotized by a stage magician (Steve O'Donnell). Spike is about to leave for America with girlfriend Zoe.

=== Series 4 (1992) ===
Series three and four were filmed together as one block. However, Lee Ross, who played Kenny, was unable to commit to the second half of the block. Therefore, Kenny has left for Australia.

Cornell remarks that this series is a "strange beast, somewhat cynical, with a tired acceptance of growing up that produced more pain in the drama than previously." It opens with a funeral, and later features the death of a central character's father.

No. overall	No. in series	Title	Directed by	Written by	Original release date
32	1	"Bad News"	Bob Spiers	Steven Moffat	7 January 1992
A live children's television show called Crazy Stuff (with Henry Naylor as presenter Zack, and Andy Parsons as the voice of "Cool Cat") arranges a reunion between Lynda and Spike, who has just arrived back again from the US. As a result of the subsequent controversy the couple cause on live TV, Lynda agrees to hire Julie as Kenny's replacement as assistant editor. Colin exploits the incident to enhance the paper's dwindling sales and prevent it from being sold by new owner Bobby Campbell (Kevin Allen).
33	2	"UnXpected"	Lorne Magory	Steven Moffat	14 January 1992
Frazz encounters the eponymous fictional character, Colonel X (Michael Jayston), of a cult TV show that he watched when he was younger. However, the actor who played him had apparently been killed in a car crash years earlier.
34	3	"She's Got It Taped"	Bob Spiers	Steven Moffat	21 January 1992
Sarah meets a nervous man named Archie Pressman (Jay Simpson) whilst recording an interview. He is the only person not to be surprised when there is a huge explosion in town.
35	4	"Love and War"	Bill Ward	Steven Moffat	28 January 1992
Spike leaves a series of angry messages on his father's answering machine. His mood is not helped when Colin chains a talking suitcase to his arm, forcing him to deliver it to one of his uncle's associates.
36	5	"In the Picture"	Bill Ward	Steven Moffat	4 February 1992
In a parody of Stakeout, Colin goes undercover as a hotel workman so that Frazz can photograph actor John Hartwood (Steven Hartley) through the window. Protective of his privacy, Hartwood tries to get his minder (Glenn McCrory) to make him leave. However, he is still in the room when the actor's girlfriend, Judy Wellman, who Colin had dated in "Chance is a Fine Thing", turns up. A lady called Katherine Hill (Sharon Duce) visits Lynda in the newsroom, and they realise that they share many mannerisms.
37	6	"Day Dreams"	Bob Spiers	Steven Moffat	11 February 1992
While sleeping in the newsroom, Mr Sullivan appears as Lynda's guardian angel. In the style of It's a Wonderful Life, he takes her on a journey into the future to see what becomes of some of the major characters when she is not around. Sarah is a war correspondent, Frazz a radio agony uncle, and Julie has taken over as editor.

=== Series 5 (1993) ===
A television film called "Deadline" was planned. It was set a few years after the series and aimed at a more adult audience. At one stage in 1992, series 4 was intended to be the last, and the movie was proposed as a follow-up. However, making of the film fell through when a fifth series was commissioned instead. The idea of the follow-up film was reconsidered several times during the 1990s, but fell through every time for various reasons.

No. overall	No. in series	Title	Directed by	Written by	Original release date
38	1	"Head and Heart"	Bill Ward	Steven Moffat	16 April 1993
As a result of his crush on the school secretary (Natalie Roles), Colin discovers that she is having an affair with the headteacher (David Collings). Since he was one of those responsible for setting up the paper, and therefore their careers, the team debate the morality of printing the story.
39	2	"Friendly Fire"	Bob Spiers	Steven Moffat	23 April 1993
Sarah decides to leave the Junior Gazette to attend university. She reads out a letter to Spike detailing the origins and evolution of her friendship with Lynda.
40	3	"A Quarter to Midnight"	Bill Ward	Steven Moffat	30 April 1993
After interviewing a source (Alan Perrin) for a story, Lynda is trapped in airtight vault. She attempts to let the team know her location armed with only a mobile phone with a broken microphone.
41	4	"Food, Love and Insecurity"	Bob Spiers	Steven Moffat	7 May 1993
The subject of a breaking news story, Phillipa Prescott (Lisa Coleman), is one of Spike's old girlfriends. He takes her to dinner at a restaurant to try to get information from her. The team bug their table, but jealous Lynda insists on being their waitress. Colin and Julie have a heart-to-heart, in which she agrees to go out on a date with him.
42	5	"Windfall"	James Devis	Steven Moffat	14 May 1993
Almost immediately after turning up at Julie's flat for their date, Colin manages to let her pets (including a goldfish) "fly" out of the window while trying to retrieve a hundred-pound note. Despite Julie's outrage, they both decide to go to an address found written on the hundred pound note.
43	6	"There Are Crocodiles"	Bob Spiers	Steven Moffat	21 May 1993
After a disastrous football game against a rival newspaper, Lynda and Spike find a body in the toilets. The news that a team member has died from a drug overdose could mean the end of the Junior Gazette. This final episode features many references to previous storylines and characters. The clearest reference is to the events in the "Monday-Tuesday" episode in series one, with some footage being reused. Julie mentions former assistant editor Kenny (Lee Ross), and there are references to the events of "A Quarter to Midnight". One of the scores of the football matches is 43–nil, a reference to the episode number.

== Home release ==
All episodes were released on DVD between 2004 and 2006. Network released the series in the UK between 2004 and 2005, and Force Entertainment released it in Australia between 2005 and 2006. Each series was released periodically, culminating in a complete boxed set. The main difference in the packaging of each series was the varying colours of the Press Gang logo, which matched the disc menu.
