= Press Gang =

British children's television series (1989–1993)

- Opening titles
- Genre: Comedy-drama
- Based on: an idea by Bill Moffat
- Written by: Steven Moffat
- Starring: Julia Sawalha; Dexter Fletcher; Lee Ross; Kelda Holmes; Paul Reynolds; Lucy Benjamin; Gabrielle Anwar; Mmoloki Chrystie; Joanna Dukes; Charlie Creed-Miles
- Theme music composer: Peter Davis; John Mealing; John G. Perry
- Country of origin: United Kingdom
- Original language: English
- No. of series: 5
- No. of episodes: 43 (list of episodes)

Production
- Executive producer: Lewis Rudd
- Producer: Sandra C. Hastie
- Camera setup: Single camera
- Running time: 25 mins

Original release
- Network: ITV (CITV)
- Release: 16 January 1989 – 21 May 1993

Press Gang is a British children's television comedy-drama consisting of 43 episodes across five series that were broadcast from 1989 to 1993. Produced by Richmond Film & Television for Central, it screened on the ITV network in its regular weekday afternoon children's strand, CITV, typically in a 4:45 pm slot (days varied over the course of the run).

Aimed at older children and teenagers, the programme was based on the activities of a children's newspaper, the Junior Gazette, produced by pupils from the local comprehensive school. In later series, it was depicted as a commercial venture. The show interspersed comedic elements with the dramatic. As well as addressing interpersonal relationships (particularly in the Lynda-Spike story arc), the show tackled issues such as solvent abuse, child abuse and firearms control.

Written by ex-teacher Steven Moffat, more than half the episodes were directed by Bob Spiers, a British comedy director who also worked on programmes such as Absolutely Fabulous and Fawlty Towers. Critical reception was very positive, particularly for the quality of the writing, and the series has attracted a cult following with a wide age range.

== Storyline ==
Series	Episodes	Originally released	
Series	Episodes	First released	Last released
1	12	16 January 1989	10 April 1989
2	13	18 January 1990	12 April 1990
3	6	7 May 1991	11 June 1991
4	6	7 January 1992	11 February 1992
5	6	16 April 1993	21 May 1993

Famous journalist Matt Kerr arrives from Fleet Street to edit the local newspaper. He sets up a junior version of the paper, The Junior Gazette, to be produced by pupils from the local comprehensive school before and after school hours.

Some of the team are "star pupils", but others have reputations for delinquency. One such pupil, Spike Thomson, is forced to work on the paper rather than be expelled from school. He is immediately attracted to editor Lynda Day, but they bicker, throwing one-liners at each other. Their relationship develops and they have an on-off relationship. They regularly discuss their feelings, especially in the concluding episodes of each series. In the final episode of the third series, "Holding On", Spike unwittingly expresses his strong feelings to Lynda while being taped. Jealous of his American girlfriend, Zoe, Lynda puts the cassette on Zoe's personal stereo, ruining their relationship. The on-screen chemistry between the two leads was reflected off-screen as they became an item for several years.

"Page One"
Lynda and Spike's first meeting. This clip demonstrates the exchange of the one-liners, Spike's accent and the animosity between the two characters.

Although the Lynda and Spike story arc runs throughout the series, most episodes feature self-contained stories and sub-plots. Amongst lighter stories, such as one about Colin accidentally attending a funeral dressed as a pink rabbit, the show tackled many serious issues. Jeff Evans, writing in the Guinness Television Encyclopedia, writes that the series adopts a "far more adult approach" than "previous efforts in the same vein" such as A Bunch of Fives. Some critics also compared it with Hill Street Blues, Lou Grant "and other thoughtful US dramas, thanks to its realism and its level-headed treatment of touchy subjects."

The first series approached solvent abuse in "How To Make A Killing", and the NSPCC assisted in the production of the "Something Terrible" episodes about child abuse. The team were held hostage by a gun enthusiast in series three's "The Last Word", while the final episode approaches drug abuse. The issue-led episodes served to develop the main characters, so that "Something Terrible" is more "about Colin's redemption [from selfish capitalist], rather than Cindy's abuse."

According to the British Film Institute, "Press Gang managed to be perhaps the funniest children's series ever made and at the same time the most painfully raw and emotionally honest. The tone could change effortlessly and sensitively from farce to tragedy in the space of an episode." Although the series is sometimes referred to as a comedy, Moffat insists that it is a drama with jokes in it. The writer recalls "a long running argument with Geoff Hogg (film editor on Press Gang) about whether Press Gang was comedy. He insisted that it was and I said it wasn't – it was just funny." Some innuendo leads Moffat to claim that it "had the dirtiest jokes in history; we got away with tons of stuff ... We nearly got away with a joke about anal sex, but they spotted it at the last minute." In one episode Lynda says she's going to "butter him up", and, when asked (while on a date in a hotel's restaurant) if he was staying at the hotel, Colin replies "I shouldn't think so: it's only the first date."

Jeff Evans also comments that the series was filmed cinematically, dabbling in "dream sequences, flashbacks, fantasies and, on one occasion, a Moonlighting-esque parody of the film It's a Wonderful Life." The show had a strong awareness of continuity, with some stories, incidents and minor characters referred to throughout the series. Actors who played short-term characters in the first two series were invited back to reprise their roles in future episodes. David Jefford (Alex Crockett) was resurrected from 1989's "Monday – Tuesday" to appear in the final episode "There Are Crocodiles", while the same actress (Aisling Flitton) who played a wrong number in "Love and the Junior Gazette" was invited to reprise her character for the third series episode "Chance is a Fine Thing." "Attention to detail" such as this is, according to Paul Cornell, "one of the numerous ways that the series respects the intelligence of its viewers."

After the team leaves school, the paper gains financial independence and runs commercially. Assistant editor Kenny leaves at the end of series three to be replaced by Julie, who was the head of the graphics team in series one.

== Characters ==
The cast of Press Gang in a publicity photograph

=== Main ===
- Lynda Day (Julia Sawalha) is the editor of the Junior Gazette. She is strong and opinionated, and is feared by many of her team. Moffat has said that the character was partly based on the show's "ball-breaking" producer, Sandra C. Hastie. Although she appears very tough, she occasionally exposes her feelings. She quits the paper at the end of "Monday-Tuesday", and in "Day Dreams" laments "Why do I get everything in my whole stupid life wrong?" Intimidated by socialising, she hiccups at the idea. She is so nervous at a cocktail party, in "At Last a Dragon", that she attempts to leave on several occasions. The mixture of Lynda's sensitive side and her self-sufficient attitude is illustrated in the series' final episode "There Are Crocodiles." Reprimanding the ghost of Gary (Mark Sayers), who died after taking a drug overdose, she says:

Look, I'm sorry you're dead, okay? I do care. But to be perfectly honest with you, I don't care a lot. You had a choice, you took the drugs, you died. Are you seriously claiming no one warned you it was dangerous? ... I mean, have you had a look at the world lately? ... There's plenty of stuff going on that kills you and you don't get warned at all. So sticking your head in a crocodile you were told about is not calculated to get my sympathy.

- James "Spike" Thomson (Dexter Fletcher) is an American delinquent, forced to work on the paper rather than being excluded from school. He is immediately attracted to Lynda, and he establishes himself as an important member of the reporting team having been responsible for getting their first lead story. He usually has a range of one-liners, though is often criticised, particularly by Lynda, for excessive joking. Spike often consciously uses humour to lighten the tone, such as in "Monday-Tuesday" when he tries to cheer up Lynda after she feels responsible for David's suicide.

The character was originally written as English, until producer Hastie felt that an American character would enhance the chance of overseas sales. This meant that English-born Fletcher had to act in an American accent for all five years. Moffat says that he isn't "sure [that] lumbering Dexter with that accent was a smart move." The American accent had some fans surprised to learn that Fletcher is actually English.

- Kenny Phillips (Lee Ross) is one of Lynda's (few) long-term friends and is her assistant editor in the first three series. Kenny is much calmer than Lynda, though is still dominated by her. Despite this, he is one of the few people able to stand up to Lynda, in his own quiet way. Although he identifies himself as "sweet", he is unlucky in love: Jenny (Sadie Frost), the girlfriend he meets in "How to Make a Killing", dumps him because he is too understanding. His secret passion for writing music is revealed at the end of series two, which was influenced by Ross' interests. Colin organizes and markets a concert for him, and the second series ends with Kenny performing "You Don't Feel For Me" (written by Ross himself). Lee Ross was only able to commit to the first six episodes of the 12-episode series three and four filming block because he was expecting a film role. Thus, by series four, Kenny has left for Australia.
- Colin Mathews (Paul Reynolds) is the Thatcherite in charge of the paper's finances and advertising. He often wears loud shirts, and his various schemes have included marketing defective half-ping-pong balls (as 'pings'), exam revision kits and soda that leaves facial stains. Rosie Marcel and Claire Hearnden appear throughout the second series as Sophie and Laura, Colin's mischievous young helpers.
- Julie Craig (Lucy Benjamin) is the head of the graphics team in series one. Moffat was impressed with Benjamin's performance, and expanded her character for the second series. However she had committed herself to roles in the LWT sitcom Close to Home and Jupiter Moon, so the character was replaced by Sam. The character returns in the opening episode of series four as researcher on the Saturday morning show Crazy Stuff. She arranges for Lynda and Spike to be reunited on live television, but the subsequent complaints about the violence (face slapping) results in Julie's firing. After giving Lynda some home truths, Julie replaces Kenny as the assistant editor for the final two series. She is a flirt, and, according to Lynda, was the "official pin-up at the last prison riot."
- Sarah Jackson (Kelda Holmes) is the paper's lead writer. Although she is intelligent she gets stressed, such as during her interview for editorship of the Junior Gazette. Her final episode, "Friendly Fire", shows the development of her friendship with Lynda, and how the latter saw her as a challenge when she first arrived to Norbridge High. Together they had established the underground school magazine: Damn Magazine. Her first attempt to leave the newspaper to attend a writing course at the local college is thwarted by Lynda, but she eventually leaves in series five to attend university (mirroring the reason for Holmes' departure).
- Frazer "Frazz" Davis (Mmoloki Chrystie) is one of Spike's co-delinquents forced into working on the paper, his initial main task writing the horoscopes. Frazz is initially portrayed as "intellectually challenged", such as not understanding the synonymous relationship between "the astrology column" and the horoscopes. Later episodes, however, show him to be devious, such as in "The Last Word: Part 2" when he stuns the gunman using a large array of flashguns.

=== Recurring ===
- Sam Black (Gabrielle Anwar) replaced Julie as the head of the graphics team in the second series. Sam is very fashion conscious and a flirt, and is surprised when an actor rejects her advances in favour of Sarah. Anwar had auditioned for the role of Lynda. (Many actors who unsuccessfully auditioned for main characters were invited back later for guest roles.) Moffat had expanded the role of Julie after the first series, but Lucy Benjamin was unavailable for series two. Sam, therefore, was basically the character of Julie under a different name, especially in her earlier episodes.
- Danny McColl (Charlie Creed-Miles) the paper's photographer. Creed-Miles became disenchanted with his minor role and left after the second series.
- Toni "Tiddler" Tildesley (Joanna Dukes) is the junior member of the team, responsible for the junior section, Junior Junior Gazette.
- Billy Homer (Andy Crowe) was also a recurring character. A tetraplegic, he is very competent with computer networks, sometimes hacking into the school's database. His storylines are some of the first representations of the Internet in British television. Moffat felt that he was unable to sustain the character, and he appears only sporadically after the first series.

The main adults are deputy headmaster Bill Sullivan (Nick Stringer), maverick editor Matt Kerr (Clive Wood) and experienced Gazette reporter Chrissie Stewart (Angela Bruce).

== Production ==
=== Inception ===
Bill Moffat, a headmaster from Glasgow, had an idea for a children's television programme called The Norbridge Files. He showed it to a producer who visited his school, Thorn Primary School in Johnstone, Renfrewshire, when it was used as the location for an episode of Harry Secombe's Highway. Producer Sandra C. Hastie liked the idea and showed it to her future husband Bill Ward, co-owner of her company Richmond Films and Television. When she requested a script, Moffat suggested that his 25-year-old son Steven, an English teacher, should write it. Hastie said that it was "the best ever first script" that she had read.

All 43 episodes were written by Steven Moffat. During production of series two, he was having an unhappy personal life after the break-up of his first marriage. His wife's new lover was represented in the episode "The Big Finish?" by the character Brian Magboy (Simon Schatzberger), a name inspired by Brian: Maggie's boy. Moffat brought in the character so that all sorts of unfortunate things would happen to him, such as having a typewriter dropped on his foot. This period in Moffat's life would also be reflected in his sitcom Joking Apart.

Central Independent Television had confidence in the project, so rather than the show being shot at their studios in Nottingham as planned, they granted Richmond a £2 million budget. This enabled it to be shot on 16 mm film, rather than the regular, less expensive videotape, and on location, making it very expensive compared with most children's television. These high production costs almost led to its cancellation at the end of the second series, by which time Central executive Lewis Rudd was unable to commission programmes by himself.

=== Directors ===
More than half of the episodes were directed by Bob Spiers, a noted British comedy director who had previously worked on Fawlty Towers amongst many other programmes. He would work again with Moffat on his sitcom Joking Apart and Murder Most Horrid, and with Sawalha on Absolutely Fabulous. According to Moffat, Spiers was the "principal director" taking an interest in the other episodes and setting the visual style of the show. Spiers particularly used tracking shots, sometimes requiring more dialogue to be written to accommodate the length of the shot. The other directors would come in and "do a Spiers". All of the directors were encouraged to attend the others' shoots so that the visual style would be consistent.

The first two episodes were directed by Colin Nutley. However, he was unhappy with the final edit and requested that his name be removed from the credits. Lorne Magory directed many episodes, notably the two-part stories "How To Make A Killing" and "The Last Word." One of the founders of Richmond Films and Television, Bill Ward, directed three episodes, and Bren Simson directed some of series two. The show's cinematographer James Devis took the directorial reins for "Windfall", the penultimate episode.

=== Location ===
Whilst the show was set in the fictional town of Norbridge, it was mostly filmed in Uxbridge, in the west of Greater London. Many of the scenes were shot at Haydon School in Pinner. The first series was filmed entirely on location, but after the demolition of the building used as the original newspaper office, interior shots were filmed in Pinewood Studios for the second series, and the exterior of the building was not seen beyond that series. Subsequent series were filmed at Lee International Studios at Shepperton (series three and four) and Twickenham Studios (series five).

=== Music and title sequences ===
The theme music was composed by Peter Davis (who after the second series composed the rest of the series alone as principal composer), John Mealing and John G. Perry. The opening titles show the main characters striking a pose, with the name of the respective actor in a typewriter style typeface. Steven Moffat and Julia Sawalha were not very impressed with the opening titles when discussing them for a DVD commentary in 2004. They were re-recorded for series three, in the same style, to address the actors' ages and alterations to the set.

Many of the closing titles in the first two series were accompanied by dialogue from two characters. Episodes that ended on a particularly sombre tone, such as "Monday-Tuesday" and "Yesterday's News", used only appropriately sombre music to accompany the end credits. After an emphatic climax, "At Last a Dragon" used an enhanced version of the main theme with more extravagant use of electric guitar. Moffat felt that the voiceovers worked well in the first series, but that they were not as good in the second. Hastie recalls that Moffat was "extremely angry" that Drop the Dead Donkey had adopted the style. They were dropped after the second series. The cast, according to Moffat, were "grumpy with having to turn up to a recording studio to record them."

== Reception ==
=== Critical reception ===
Critical reaction was good, the show being particularly praised for the high quality and sophistication of the writing. The first episode was highly rated by The Daily Telegraph, The Guardian and the Times Educational Supplement. In his emphatic review, Paul Cornell writes that:

Press Gang has proved to be a series that can transport you back to how you felt as a teenager, sharper that the world but with as much angst as acute wit ... Never again can a show get away with talking down to children or writing sloppily for them. Press Gang, possibly the best show in the world.

Time Out said that "this is quality entertainment: the kids are sharp, the scripts are clever and the jokes are good." The BBC's William Gallagher called it "pretty flawless", with The Guardian retrospectively commending the series. Others, such as Popmatters, have also commented upon how "the show is renowned ... for doing something kid television at the time didn't do (and, arguably, still doesn't): it refused to treat its audience like children." Comedian Richard Herring recalls watching the show as a recent graduate, commenting that it "was subtle, sophisticated and much too good for kids." According to Moffat, "Press Gang had gone over very, very well in the industry and I was being touted and romanced all the time." Press Gang's complicated plots and structure would become a hallmark of Moffat's work, such as Joking Apart and Coupling.

The series received a Royal Television Society award and a BAFTA in 1991 for "Best Children's Programme (Entertainment/Drama)". It was also nominated for two Writers' Guild of Great Britain awards, one Prix Jeunesse and the 1992 BAFTA for "Best Children's Programme (Fiction)". Julia Sawalha won the Royal Television Society Television Award for "Best Actor – Female" in 1993.

=== Repeat showings ===
The show gained an even wider adult audience in an early evening slot when repeated on Sundays on Channel 4 in 1991. This crossover is reflected in the BBC's review for one of the DVDs when they say that "Press Gang is one of the best series ever made for kids. Or adults."

Nickelodeon showed nearly all of the episodes in a weekday slot in 1997. The final three episodes of the third series, however, were not repeated on the children's channel because of their content: "The Last Word" double episode with the gun siege, and "Holding On" with the repetition of the phrase "divorce the bitch". On the first transmission of the latter on 11 June 1991, continuity announcer Tommy Boyd warned viewers that it contained stronger than usual language. In 2007, itv.com made the first series, with the exception of "Page One", available to be viewed on its website free of charge.

Two episodes were broadcast on the CITV Channel on 5 & 6 January 2013, as part of a weekend of archive programmes to celebrate CITV's 30th anniversary. Since 2022, the full series is available online on the ITV streaming service ITVX.

=== Fan following ===
Press Gang has attracted a cult following. A fanzine, Breakfast at Czars, was produced in the 1990s. Edited by Stephen O'Brien, it contained a range of interviews with the cast and crew (notably with producer Hastie), theatre reviews and fanfiction. The first edition was included as a PDF file on the series two DVD, while the next three were on the series five disc. An email discussion list has been operational since February 1997. Scholar Miles Booy observes that as Steven Moffat was himself a fan of Doctor Who, he was able to ingrate the elements that TV fans appreciated, such as:

series finales with big cliff-hangers, rigorous continuity and a slew of running jokes and references which paid those who watched and rewatched the text to pull out its minutia. At the end of the second series, it is remarked that the news team have been following the Spike/Lynda romance 'since page one', and only the fans remembered – or discovered on reviewing – that "Page One" was the title of the first episode.

Booy points out that Chris Carter and Joss Whedon would be acclaimed for these elements in the 1990s (in the shows The X-Files and Buffy the Vampire Slayer), but "Moffat got there first, and ... in a children's TV slot. His was the first show to arrive with a Britain's fan's sensibility to formal possibilities."

Two conventions were held in the mid-1990s in Liverpool. The events, in aid of the NSPCC, were each titled "Both Sides of the Paper" and were attended by Steven Moffat, Sandra Hastie, Dexter Fletcher, Paul Reynolds, Kelda Holmes and Nick Stringer. There were screenings of extended rough cuts of "A Quarter to Midnight" and "There Are Crocodiles", along with auctions of wardrobe and props. When Virgin Publishing prevented Paul Cornell from writing an episode guide, the Press Gang Programme Guide, edited by Jim Sangster, was published by Leomac Publishing in 1995. Sangster, O'Brien and Adrian Petford collaborated with Network DVD on the extra features for the DVD releases.

Big Finish Productions, which produces audio plays based on sci-fi properties, particularly Doctor Who, was named after the title of the final episode of the second series. Moffat himself is an ardent Doctor Who fan, and became the programme's lead writer and executive producer in 2009.

Moffat has integrated many references to secondary characters and locations in Press Gang in his later work. His 1997 sitcom Chalk refers to a neighbouring school as Norbridge High, run by Mr Sullivan, and to the characters Dr Clipstone ("UneXpected"), Malcolm Bullivant ("Something Terrible") and David Jefford ("Monday-Tuesday"/"There are Crocodiles"), a pupil who Mr Slatt (David Bamber) reprimands for masturbating. The name "Talwinning" appears as the name of streets in "A Quarter to Midnight" and Joking Apart, and as the surname of the protagonist in "Dying Live", an episode of Murder Most Horrid written by Moffat, as well as the name of a librarian in his Doctor Who prose short story, "Continuity Errors", which was published in the 1996 Virgin Books anthology Decalog 3: Consequences. The name "Inspector Hibbert", from "The Last Word", is given to the character played by Nick Stringer in "Elvis, Jesus and Jack", Moffat's final Murder Most Horrid contribution. Most recently, in the first episode of Moffat's Jekyll, Mr Hyde (James Nesbitt) whistled the same tune as Lynda in "Going Back to Jasper Street".

=== Proposed television movie ===
A television film called "Deadline" was planned. It was set a few years after the series and aimed at a more adult audience. At one stage in 1992, series 4 was intended to be the last, and the movie was proposed as a follow-up. However, making of the film fell through when a fifth series was commissioned instead. The idea of the follow-up film was reconsidered several times during the 1990s, but every time fell through for various reasons.

In June 2007, The Stage reported that Moffat and Sawalha are interested in reviving Press Gang. He said: "I would revive that like a shot. I would love to do a reunion episode—a grown-up version. I know Julia Sawalha is interested—every time I see her she asks me when we are going to do it. Maybe it will happen—I would like it to." The Guardian advocated the show's revival, arguing that "a revamped Press Gang with Moffat at the helm could turn the show from a cult into a national institution - a petri dish for young acting and writing talent to thrive. It's part of our TV heritage and definitely worthy of resuscitation."

At the Edinburgh International Television Festival in August 2008, Moffat told how he got drunk after the wrap party for Jekyll and pitched the idea of a Press Gang reunion special to the Head of Drama at the BBC, John Yorke. Despite Yorke's approval, the writer said that he was too busy with his work on Doctor Who to pursue the idea.

== Merchandise ==
Several products have been released, specifically four novelisations, a video and the complete collection on DVD.

Four novelisations were written by Bill Moffat and published by Hippo Books/Scholastic in 1989 and 1990 based on the first two series. First Edition was based on the first three episodes, with Public Exposure covering "Interface" and "How to Make a Killing." The third book, Checkmate, covered "Breakfast at Czar's", "Picking Up the Pieces" and "Going Back to Jasper Street", and reveals that Julie left the graphics department to go to art college. The fourth and final book, The Date, is a novelisation of "Money, Love and Birdseed", "Love and the Junior Gazette" and "At Last a Dragon." Each book featured an eight-page photographic insert.

VCI Home Video, with Central Video, released one volume on VHS in 1990 featuring the first four episodes: "Page One", "Photo Finish", "One Easy Lesson" and "Deadline." The complete series of Press Gang is available on DVD (Region 2, UK) from Network DVD and in Australia (Region 4) from Force Entertainment. Four episodes of the second series DVD features an audio commentary by Julia Sawalha and Steven Moffat, in which the actress claims to remember very little about the show. Shooting scripts and extracts from Jim Sangster's programme guide (published by Leomac Publishing) are included in PDF format from series two onwards. The second series DVD set also contains the only existing copy, in offline edit form, of an unaired documentary filmed during production of series two.

== Bibliography ==
- Booy, Miles (2012). Love and Monsters: The Doctor Who Experience, 1979 to the Present. I.B.Tauris. ISBN 978-1848854796.
- Cornell, Paul (1993). "Press Gang". In Cornell, Paul; Day, Martin; Topping, Keith (eds.). The Guinness Book of Classic British TV. Guinness. ISBN 0-85112-543-3.
- Evans, Jeff (1995). The Guinness Television Encyclopedia. Guinness. ISBN 0-85112-744-4.
- McGown, Alistair D.; Docherty, Mark J. (2003). The hill and beyond: children's television drama : an encyclopedia. British Film Institute. ISBN 0-85170-879-X.
- Sangster, Jim, ed. (1995). Press Gang Programme Guide. Leomac Publishing. ISBN 0-9526955-0-2.
