= Robert Fyfe =

Scottish actor (1930–2021)

- Born: 25 September 1930; Kirkcaldy, Fife, Scotland
- Died: 15 September 2021 (aged 90)
- Occupation: Actor
- Years active: 1954–2017
- Spouse: Diana Rush (m. 1957; died 2021)
- Children: 3

Robert Douglas Fyfe (25 September 1930 – 15 September 2021) was a Scottish actor, best known for his role as Howard in the long-running British sitcom Last of the Summer Wine from 1985 to 2010.

== Early life ==
Fyfe was born in Kirkcaldy on 25 September 1930, the son of Douglas Fyfe, a watchmaker, and Mary Fyfe née Irvine. He attended Kirkcaldy High School, before studying English literature at the University of Edinburgh. He did not complete his degree and instead trained under Esmé Church at the Northern Theatre School in Bradford, graduating in 1954. Whilst studying, he performed in Halifax, York and Scarborough, including appearing in the York Mystery Plays in 1954.

== Career ==
Fyfe was best known for playing Howard in the sitcom Last of the Summer Wine from 1985 until the programme's end in 2010.

He appeared in the films Xtro, The 51st State, Around the World in 80 Days, Gaolbreak and Babel. In 2012 he appeared in Cloud Atlas. Other credits include guest appearances on Z-Cars, Survivors, The Gentle Touch, The Return of Sherlock Holmes and Monarch of the Glen. Fyfe appeared as Malcolm Lagg, a lollipop man, in Coronation Street in December 2012. His character was seen training Dennis Tanner, played by Philip Lowrie, to take over his job.

== Personal life ==
He married stage director Diana Rush in 1957. She died in August 2021. Fyfe died from kidney disease on 15 September 2021, at the age of 90. They were survived by their three sons, Timothy, Nicholas and Dominic.

== Filmography ==
=== Film ===
Year	Title	Role	Notes	Source
1962	Gaolbreak	Wally		
1982	Xtro	Doctor		
2001	The 51st State	Hector Dougal McElroy		
2004	Around the World in 80 Days	Jean Michel		
2006	Babel	Tourist Number 14		
2010	Burke & Hare	Old Donald		
2011	The Decoy Bride	Ancient Crofter		
2012	Cloud Atlas	Old Salty Dog / Mr. Meeks / Prescient 1		
2016	Pride and Prejudice and Zombies	Butler Edwin		

=== Television roles ===
Year	Title	Role	Notes	Source
1962	Dr. Finlay’s Casebook	-	Episode: "It's All In The Mind"	
1971	The Onedin Line	Evans	Episode: "Mutiny"	
1975	Z Cars	Walter Heckley	Episode: "Tonight and Every Night"	
1982	Third Time Lucky	Mr MacTaggart	Episode: "Change Partners"	
1985–2010	Last of the Summer Wine	Howard Sibshaw	230 episodes	
1988	The Return of Sherlock Holmes	Booking Clerk	1 episode	
1989	No Strings	Grandad	7 episodes	
2004	Monarch of the Glen	Jackie McIntyre	1 episode	
2009	Misfits	Harry	1 episode	
2012	Coronation Street	Malcolm Lagg	7 episodes	
2017	Carters Get Rich	Bernard	2 episodes	
