= 18 Stone of Idiot =

- Starring: Johnny Vegas
- Country of origin: United Kingdom
- No. of episodes: 6

Production
- Producer: UMTV

Original release
- Network: Channel 4
- Release: 27 May – 1 July 2005

18 Stone of Idiot is a British television programme broadcast on Channel 4 in 2005 designed as a vehicle for Johnny Vegas and produced by Chris Evans.

The first show was broadcast on 27 May 2005 and a further five episodes were broadcast weekly thereafter. Vegas' stated intention was to make a programme "so ridiculous that there was no way they'd recommission it."

Each show had one primary guest whom Vegas interviewed, and who were further involved in various stunts and skits.

== Guest list ==
- Ray Winstone
- Kathy Burke
- Erkan Mustafa
- Huey Morgan from The Fun Lovin' Criminals
- Elvis Costello
- Rhys Ifans
- David Soul

An appearance was made by former MP Neil Hamilton who danced in a perspex box whilst buckets of fish were poured over his head.

== Regular features ==
- At the end of the programme Vegas would "jump" over the guest in a vehicle such as a shopping trolley or child's tricycle.
- A reality television style slot based around a lock-in where celebrities drank with Johnny until heavily inebriated. Vegas states that the filming of these segments took place over an eight-hour period, though only three minutes were shown per episode.
- TV Democracy in which members of the audience would ask Vegas to do whatever they ask him to do. These seemed to be planned out, as some requests were played out via a pre-recorded video.
- An actor dressed as a green budgerigar beating up Johnny.

== DVD release ==
On 31 October 2005 a DVD of the series (entitled Johnny Vegas - 18 Stone of Idiot - Unseen & Uncut) was released by Channel 4 DVD. The show was edited down to a 78-minute compilation and accompanied by 169 minutes of extras, which comprises a full-length commentary by Vegas, writer Tony Pitts and series producer Gareth Collett; a 36-minute compilation of Celebrity Lock-In footage (the segment was not included in the main programme compilation); 18 minutes of outtakes; a 5-minute compilation of footage of the Angry Baboon character (again, these interludes were not included in the main compilation); and an extended 32-minute version of the My Favourite Things segment which saw Vegas appear on Challenge's Celebrity Poker Club.
