= Joanna Dukes =

English actress

Joanna Dukes is an English actress who played Toni 'Tiddler' Tildesley in Press Gang which ended in 1993.

== TV ==
- Press Gang
- Casualty
- C.A.T.S. Eyes
- The Box of Delights .... Maria
- Behind the Bike Sheds
