= Call Me Mister (TV series) =

1986 British television series

- Created by: Robert Banks Stewart
- Starring: Steve Bisley; David Bamber; Dulice Liecier
- Theme music composer: George Fenton
- Country of origin: United Kingdom
- Original language: English
- No. of series: 1
- No. of episodes: 10

Production
- Producer: Robert Banks Stewart
- Running time: 50 minutes
- Production company: BBC

Original release
- Network: BBC1
- Release: 5 September – 7 November 1986

Call Me Mister is a British television drama series, created by Robert Banks Stewart who had previously developed Shoestring and Bergerac for the BBC. One series of ten episodes was broadcast between 5 September and 7 November 1986.

The series starred Steve Bisley as Jack Bartholomew, an Australian former police officer who returns to England after his father dies, having inherited his substantial estate. Uncomfortable with his new found status, Bartholomew prefers to use his police skills working as a private detective.

== Cast ==
=== Main / regular ===
- Steve Bisley as Jack Bartholomew
- David Bamber as Fred Hurley
- Dulice Liecier as Julie Columbus
- Dermot Crowley as Det. Sgt. McBride
- Haydn Gwynne as Bridget Bartholomew
- Rupert Frazer as Philip Bartholomew

=== Guests ===
- Arky Michael as Barman (1 episode)
- Kate Fitzpatrick as Ingrid (1 episode)
- Norman Kaye as Sir James Bartholomew (1 episode)

== Episodes ==
No.	Title	Directed by	Written by	Original release date
1	"Long Shot"	Colin Bucksey	Robert Banks Stewart	5 September 1986
2	"Tour De Force"	Ken Hannam	Michael Aitkens	12 September 1986
3	"The Creative Accountant"	Ken Hannam	Bob Baker	19 September 1986
4	"Humpty Dumpty"	Roger Tucker	Glenn Chandler	26 September 1986
5	"Something in the City"	Mike Vardy	Glenn Chandler	3 October 1986
6	"Frozen Assets"	Laurence Moody	Terry Hodgkinson	10 October 1986
7	"Running Time"	Peter Ellis	Peter Miller	17 October 1986
8	"The Other Woman"	Don Leaver	Robert Bennett	24 October 1986
9	"The Bombay Duck"	Guy Slater	Terry Hodgkinson	31 October 1986
10	"The Carve Up"	David Carson	Michael Aitkens	7 November 1986
