= No Strings (1989 TV series) =

Television series

- Genre: Sitcom
- Written by: Jan Butlin
- Directed by: Ronnie Baxter
- Starring: Edward Petherbridge; Jean Marsh
- Composer: John Dankworth
- Country of origin: United Kingdom
- Original language: English
- No. of series: 1
- No. of episodes: 7

Production
- Producer: Ronnie Baxter
- Running time: 30 minutes
- Production company: Yorkshire Television

Original release
- Network: ITV
- Release: 12 April – 31 May 1989

No Strings is a British television sitcom which aired on ITV in one series of seven episodes in 1989.

== Synopsis ==
After Sam and Rosie find their respective spouses are cheating on them together, they meet and begin to bond.

== Cast ==
- Edward Petherbridge as Sam Jessop
- Jean Marsh as Rosie Tindall
- Amanda Waring as Sally Tindall
- John McAndrew as Joe Jessop
- Graham McGrath as Nick Jessop
- Robert Fyfe as Grandad
- Alison Bettles as Sonia
- Sam Smart as Darren
