= The A-Team season 4 =

The A-Team
- Season 4
- Original season 4 DVD cover
- No. of episodes: 23

Release
- Original network: NBC
- Original release: September 24, 1985 – May 13, 1986

Season chronology
- ← Previous; Season 3 Next → Season 5

The fourth season of the action-adventure television series The A-Team premiered in the United States on NBC on September 24, 1985, and concluded on May 13, 1986, consisting of 23 episodes.

== Cast ==
- George Peppard as Lieutenant Colonel/Colonel John "Hannibal" Smith
- Dirk Benedict as First Lieutenant Templeton "Faceman" Peck
- Dwight Schultz as Captain H. M. Murdock
- Mr. T as Sergeant First Class Bosco Albert "B. A." (Bad Attitude) Baracus

== Episodes ==
No. overall	No. in season	Title	Directed by	Written by	Original release date
63	1	"Judgment Day"	David Hemmings	Frank Lupo	September 24, 1985
64	2	"Judgment Day"	David Hemmings	Frank Lupo	September 24, 1985
Travelling to Italy to rescue a judge's daughter from a group of mobsters, the A-Team runs into trouble when they find that the mobsters are quite well prepared on their own territory. Meanwhile, Col. Decker is once again hot on the trail of the team. After The A-Team complete their mission they are followed by the criminals who they rescued the judge's daughter from. They must hold them off till they reach the shores of America, and keep the boat intact while doing so.: Note: Originally shown as a feature-length episode, which was later cut into two separate episodes for syndication.; Special Guest Star: June Chadwick as Carla Singer.
65	3	"Where Is the Monster When You Need Him?"	Michael O'Herlihy	Stephen J. Cannell	October 1, 1985
When Smith's acting career brings the A-Team to a small Mexican town, they find their movie plans blocked by the Argentinian war criminal Major Ramon DeJarro wanted by ten governments hiding out from international authorities. Allowing themselves to be captured, they rely on Murdock's nuttiness to concoct a plan of escape and leave the criminals for the authorities. The A-Team attends the premiere of Hannibal's new movie at the end.
66	4	"Lease with an Option to Die"	David Hemmings	Bill Nuss	October 22, 1985
Chicago building plans are put on hold as the A-Team defends B.A.'s mother against the new building management. It turns out a developer had been purchasing buildings in the names of people in retirement homes, and had been hiring rude and ignorant thugs to drive the people out with their antics. The A-Team turn the tables on the developer by bringing an elderly man whose name was used to buy the apartment building Mrs. Baracus lives, and exposing him as a crook. At the end, Murdock has accumulated numerous facts and stories about B.A. from his mother, which he has completely memorised to use in future situations. Special Guest Star: Della Reese as Mrs. Baracus. Ray Wise as Phillip Chadway.
67	5	"The Road to Hope"	David Hemmings	Stephen J. Cannell	October 29, 1985
While avoiding a Decker trap, the A-Team stumble upon an illegal operation that includes knocking off skid-row winos. Hannibal, impersonating a wino calling himself Jim Beam, is abducted. He manages to escape and rejoin the team. Together they set out to expose the secret group by setting up a mission of their own, and run them out of business. What they will find is an operation bigger than they previously imagined. The team needs more help than they realized.
68	6	"The Heart of Rock N' Roll"	Tony Mordente	Frank Lupo	November 5, 1985
Rick James asks the A-Team to help old rock-and-roll legend C.J. Mack whose life in prison has suddenly become very dangerous. Special Guest Star: Isaac Hayes as C.J. Mack.
69	7	"Body Slam"	Craig R. Baxley	Bill Nuss	November 12, 1985
Hulk Hogan asks his old friend B.A. for the A-Team's help against a mobster who is out to close down the youth center he's financing for no apparent reason. As it turns out, the mobster's father had robbed a gold truck in 1958 and the gold was buried under the ground the youth center is built on. Ironically, the gold is in the last place they would expect to find it - the chimney. Special Guest Star: Hulk Hogan as himself.
70	8	"Blood, Sweat, and Cheers"	Sidney Hayers	Tom Blomquist	November 19, 1985
The A-Team is called upon to help a family friend survive his dream of automobile racing. However, in high school, his father and Hannibal were rivals over the family friend's mother. Note: Last appearance of Colonel Decker until the A-Team's trial in the next season. Special Guest Stars: Wings Hauser as Kyle Ludwig and Benedict's future wife Toni Hudson.
71	9	"Mind Games"	Michael O'Herlihy	Stephen J. Cannell	November 26, 1985
Face gets an unexpected presidential pardon and leaves the team. However, Hannibal, B.A. and Murdock (now posing as replacement con artist for Face, Hunker) all believe that the pardon is illegitimate. Soon turns out that Face was used as a bait by a rogue CIA agent (David Hedison) and his team to capture a North Vietnamese general whose daughter Face had once seduced during the Vietnam War.
72	10	"There Goes the Neighborhood"	Dennis Donnelly	Bill Nuss	December 3, 1985
The A-Team rents a home in a quiet suburban neighborhood while protecting a famous rock starlet. They ruffle the feathers of the local neighborhood watch block captain, an international drug syndicate, and show business moguls. In the end, the A-Team is able to rally the neighborhood watch into helping them with having the moguls and syndicate fight each other; they leave the crooks tied up for the authorities. Guest Stars: Walter Oklewicz as Joe Skrylow; John Aprea as Woody Stone; Valerie Stevenson as Stevie Faith; Victor Campos as Juarez; Julius Carry as Mussaf; Robert Pastorelli as Dixon; Steve Eastin as Taylor; Richard McGonagle as Pete Peterson'; Peggy Walton-Walker as Estate Agent; Scott St. James as Newscaster; Jennifer Roach as Penny Peterson; Shawn Casey-O'Brien as Engineer; In keeping with the increase in guest stars this season, the rock singer was planned to be played by Cyndi Lauper (Valerie Stevenson played the role).
73	11	"The Doctor Is Out"	David Hemmings	Richard Christian Matheson & Thomas Szollosi	December 10, 1985
H. M. Murdock's psychiatrist (Richard Anderson) is on the verge of getting him to confess to being a member of the A-Team, when he is kidnapped. Murdock gets the A-Team to follow him to South America to bring him back home. At the same time, a woman is also traveling with the A-team, and it seems she's suffering from an identity crisis with a twist.
74	12	"Uncle Buckle-Up"	Michael O'Herlihy	Danny Lee Cole	December 17, 1985
Hannibal auditions for the role of Ruff the Bear in the show The Uncle Buckle Up Show. There he finds out that Uncle Buckle is in trouble, since someone is using his toys to smuggle heroin. Hannibal later gives the role back to original actor, thinking he has lived his dream of being on TV. Featuring Arte Johnson as Sydney/Uncle Buckle-Up.
75	13	"Wheel of Fortune"	David Hemmings	Bill Nuss	January 14, 1986
Murdock's fortunes rise and fall as he uses Face's system to win big on Wheel of Fortune. He wins a trip to Hawaii, but then is kidnapped by impostor agents who claim to be CIA, but turn out to be criminals who know about Murdock's past involvement with the CIA. Hannibal is on holiday in Rio whilst Face and B.A. search for Murdock. Guest starring Pat Sajak, Vanna White, and Jack Clark as themselves.
76	14	"The A-Team Is Coming, the A-Team Is Coming"	David Hemmings	Steve Beers	January 21, 1986
The A-Team works with an old Russian friend to prevent World War III when a rogue Soviet general, known as "Ivan the Terrible" for atrocities he committed in Vietnam, attempts to steal a top-secret satellite system.
77	15	"Members Only"	Tony Mordente	Bill Nuss	January 28, 1986
Face joins a trendy country club (The Beverly Bay), only to find there is a counterfeit money operation on the premises. Special Guest Stars: Carole Cook as Mrs. Prescott, Shecky Greene as himself, Kevin McCarthy as Bob McKeever and Jack Ging as General Harlan "Bull" Fullbright.
78	16	"Cowboy George"	Tony Mordente	Stephen J. Cannell	February 11, 1986
Face books Boy George instead of Cowboy George, to sing at a country and western bar near an oil pipeline; to keep the locals happy, Hannibal pretends to be Cowboy George. Boy George assists the team. Guest Stars: LQ Jones as Chuck Danford; Taylor Lacher as Miller; Ben Slack as Herm; Jim Boeke as Butch; Johnny Lee as Cagen; Special Guest Star: Boy George as himself. (Amusingly, the end credits - accompanied by "Karma Chameleon" rather than the series' theme music - list each individual member of Culture Club as playing "Culture Club," e.g. "Jon Moss as Culture Club.")
79	17	"Waiting for Insane Wayne"	Craig R. Baxley	Stephen J. Cannell & Frank Lupo	February 18, 1986
Through a mix-up, the A-Team learns a homesteader who was a war hero in Vietnam (and knew the A-Team) is being run off his property. The A-Team must fight Insane Wayne and the other mercenaries to help protect the homesteader's young son who is in love with the boss villain daughter. Special Guest Star: Barry Corbin as Kincaid.
80	18	"The Duke of Whispering Pines"	Sidney Hayers	Jayne C. Ehrlich	February 25, 1986
B.A.'s old high-school flame calls the A-Team to help find her husband, a commodities expert; finding him requires going up against a corrupt sheriff, bankers, and very impolite 'miners'.
81	19	"Beneath the Surface"	Michael O'Herlihy	Story by : Lloyd J. Schwartz; Teleplay by : Danny Lee Cole	March 4, 1986
Face returns to his orphanage for a reunion and meets an old friend's sister, who is worried about her brother's disappearance, and an old girlfriend, who is in cahoots with Fulbright to trap Face for the reward. While running away from the army, they have to find the missing brother. Filming dates: January 22–30, 1986 Production Code: #1416
82	20	"Mission of Peace"	Craig R. Baxley	Steven L. Sears & Burt Pearl	March 11, 1986
Senior citizens hire the A-Team to protect their historic Texas mission home and tourist attraction from land developers who want to destroy everything and run them off their land. Face later discovers that one of the seniors, played by veteran actor David White of Bewitched fame, is his con artist role model, who "sold the Brooklyn bridge to Brooklyn"; he lied about the historic importance of the land to give the other elderly a place to live, and kept denying the others' petitions to find historical value in the land to keep it a secret. Face later uses a con of his own to find true historical importance for the land.
83	21	"The Trouble with Harry"	David Hemmings	Bull Nuss	March 25, 1986
A washed-up boxer, Harry Sullivan, goes up against old enemies. The A-Team helps his son Jeffery, a regular at B.A.'s youth center, fight off two different troublemakers, Crazy Richie Ifker and fats Styles. Face and Murdock wish they hadn't answered their phone. Special Guest Stars: Hulk Hogan and William Perry as themselves.
84	22	"A Little Town with an Accent"	Michael O'Herlihy	Richard Christian Matheson & Thomas Szollosi	May 6, 1986
A mafia don, Samuel Marlini, knocks over gasoline stations in a bucolic highway town to keep busy in his old age; the A-Team helps the sheriff lock up half the nation's organized crime bosses.
85	23	"The Sound of Thunder"	Michael O'Herlihy	Frank Lupo	May 13, 1986
General Fulbright—who has been chasing the team—comes to them for help. He wants the team to find and free a group of Vietnam POWs, that supposedly includes the only officer that can clear their names. During the job Fulbright finds out that Murdock is part of the A-Team, but during their narrow escape under fire Fulbright is killed by Vietnamese troops before telling anyone else about his next move. The team also suffer from Vietnam flashbacks from their time in the military. The episode guest-stars Tia Carrere as Fulbright's heretofore unknown half-Vietnamese daughter. Filming dates: March 4–12, 1986 Production Code: #1427
