= Kelda Holmes =

English actress

- Born: 1971 (age 54–55); Westminster, London, England

Kelda Louisa Holmes (born 1971) is an English actress best known for playing Sarah Jackson in the Children's ITV television programme Press Gang.

Towards the end of series 4, Holmes's character wished to leave the paper to pursue an education at university. In real life, Holmes also wished to further her university education. She therefore asked to be dropped to recurring status.

She is the sister of John Holmes, who played Luke "Gonch" Gardner in Grange Hill.

== TV ==
- Press Gang (1989–1993)
- Two of Us (1987)
- An Unsuitable Job for a Woman (1982)

== Radio ==
Kelda played Hannah in the BBC Radio 4 series of Second Thoughts. In the TV version of Second Thoughts, the role was played by Press Gang alum Julia Sawalha.
