= The A-Team season 5 =

The A-Team
- Season 5
- Original season 5 DVD cover
- No. of episodes: 13

Release
- Original network: NBC
- Original release: September 26, 1986 – March 8, 1987

Season chronology
- ← Previous; Season 4

The fifth and final season of the action-adventure television series The A-Team premiered in the United States on NBC on September 26, 1986, and concluded on March 8, 1987, consisting of 13 episodes. Robert Vaughn and Eddie Velez joined the cast in this season. At the beginning of this season, a remixed version of The A-Team theme tune was introduced.

== Opening credits ==
The opening credits were changed in this season, which consisted of scenes taken from "Dishpan Man", "Trial by Fire", "Firing Line", Season 3's "Timber", Season 4's feature length two-part episode "Judgment Day", "The Sound of Thunder", and Season 5's "Quarterback Sneak".

== Cast ==
- George Peppard as Lieutenant Colonel/Colonel John "Hannibal" Smith
- Dirk Benedict as First Lieutenant Templeton "Faceman" Peck
- Dwight Schultz as Captain H. M. Murdock
- Mr. T as Sergeant First Class Bosco Albert "B. A." (Bad Attitude) Baracus
- Eddie Velez as Frankie "Dishpan Man" Santana
- Robert Vaughn as (former United States Army General) Hunt Stockwell

== Premise ==
After the last four seasons, ratings had started going down for the show since it had been "wash and repeat" for several years, with repeating problems that clients presented them with. A change was made in an effort to bring ratings back up by completely changing the A-Team's reason for being on missions, as well as introducing a new member (Frankie Santana) to the team. The running gag of Face constantly springing Murdock from the mental hospital was also dropped, with Murdock declared sane and usually out looking for a job; Murdock has never held the same job for two episodes, suggesting his lunacy or being dragged on missions caused his bosses to fire him.

The A-Team now resided in a safe house in Virginia, although Murdock continued to live separately in an apartment. Now under the command of the mysterious General Stockwell, the team was working for the government on top secret missions that the U.S. could not send their own agents in on; after a set amount, Stockwell would get them presidential pardons. New running gags involved Frankie and Face questioning Stockwell's methods, Frankie arguing with B.A. over transportation between countries (as Frankie gets seasick, while B.A. is just scared of flying), and Hannibal going against Stockwell's orders.

== Episodes ==
No. overall	No. in season	Title	Directed by	Written by	Original release date
86	1	"Dishpan Man"	Tony Mordente	Stephen J. Cannell	September 26, 1986
After being sent to the hospital for a mishap on the movie set, Hannibal is kidnapped by retired General Hunt Stockwell, who offers the colonel the choice between going to jail or the A-Team performing a mission for him. They are to rescue a group of hostages from a hijacked flight in Spain. As an extra incentive, Stockwell reveals that former ally Captain Josh Curtis is on the plane, and he might have information that could clear the A-Team's names. Instead, after being freed, Curtis betrays the team and falsely tells Stockwell he saw the A-Team murder Colonel Morrison and burn their headquarters to cover the crime. After ten years of being fugitives, the A-Team has finally been captured. Filming dates: July 17–25, 1986 Production Code: #1506
87	2	"Trial by Fire"	Les Sheldon	Tom Blomquist	October 3, 1986
The court martial of the A-Team is under way, featuring witnesses (among them Col. Roderick Decker) and a recounting of the team's "crime they didn't commit." Curtis is exposed of giving false information, but before the truth comes out fully, he is killed by his gunrunner partners. Fearful that Murdock, who is not part of the court martial, will be suspected, the rest of the A-Team is convicted at the hearing. Meanwhile, Frankie Santana, a colleague of Hannibal's in his stunt work, and Murdock seek evidence to prove the innocence of Hannibal, Face, and BA. Note: Murdock locates a former North Vietnamese officer [who named Colonel Morrison in a list at the court-martial who had been bribed by the North Vietnamese for information] who tells the truth to Murdock about why the A Team were sent on a suicide mission to rob the Hanoi National Bank - it was a set up by Colonel Morrison to try to get the team killed as Morrison was actually a traitor who was working with the Viet Cong; when the A-Team actually succeeded in their Impossible Mission, Morrison was executed for his failure to get them killed! Similar to Curtis, the Vietnamese lies about the A-Team at the court Martial... and the team is found guilty of the charges!
88	3	"Firing Line"	Michael O'Herlihy	Frank Lupo	October 10, 1986
Time is running out for the team as their execution is impending. In jail, each A-Team member reacts in his thoughts according to their nature: Hannibal tries to think up an escape plan; Face last wish is for a beautiful girl to serve him champagne (but sees Hannibal in his Aquamonster costume tell him he'll see him in the swamp); B.A. is rescued by Murdock, but Murdock makes so many crazy demands B.A would rather face the firing squad! Murdock and Frankie desperately seek Stockwell's help in helping the team escape, but are rebuffed. Stockwell meets the A Team and says that while he won't help them escape, he does say that if they do escape on their own, he'll shelter and protect them with the offer of a presidential pardon but at a price of doing "suicide missions"! Eventually, through Murdock and Frankie's and Stockwell's clever manipulations, the team escapes their execution and are coerced into joining Stockwell's agency, whereupon they will perform covert high-risk "Suicide missions" for him in exchange for a presidential pardon. Their first job is to capture Curtiss gunrunner partners--Hannibal remarks "We're back"! Because of his collaboration in saving the A-Team, Frankie is forced by Stockwell to join them. On the bright side, Stockwell has Frankie's hospitalized relative taken care of. The team is moved to a home in Virginia, where the four now live. Murdock is also revealed to have been declared sane, likely through Stockwell's connections, and now has his first job a dozen dog walker.
89	4	"Quarterback Sneak"	Craig R. Baxley	Paul Birnbaum	October 17, 1986
Stockwell's latest mission has the A-Team travel to East Germany to sneak out a chemical warfare scientist who's had second thoughts about his invention. While Hannibal poses as the owner of a football team to keep the scientist's boss busy, the rest of the A-Team to secure the scientist's wife. However, "Project Victory" may prove to bring out explosive consequences. Murdock's job: Inspector No. Six of the garment industry. He later gets promoted to No. 1's assistant after finding a flaw in a trench coat inspected by No. 1. Game footage of the 1983 USFL season opener between the New Jersey Generals and Los Angeles Express is used. Special Guest Stars: Joe Namath as T.J. Bryant, John Matuszak as Davey Miller and Jim Brown as Steamroller.
90	5	"The Theory of Revolution"	Sidney Hayers	Burt Pearl & Steven L. Sears	October 24, 1986
General Stockwell sends his team to the tiny island of San Marcos, where they try to free two American intelligence agents who have been taken prisoner by a ruthless dictator. Frankie falls in love with Juanita, a local, and takes the matter personally. It turns out that the ship the agents were taken on is more valuable than them. They escape to an awaiting sub while the A-Team show the dictator and his Russian ally not to mess with them. Murdock's job: Bison scout leader-he gives Face a "Baying wolf" scout badge; both the teaser and the epilogue show that while B.A still hates flying-he loves to fly model airplanes!
91	6	"The Say U.N.C.L.E. Affair"	Michael O'Herlihy	Terry D. Nelson	October 31, 1986
In the teaser the A-Team sneaks into Siberia and steals a secret USSR Fighter jet. The A-Team must deal with Stockwell's former partner-turned-adversary Ivan Trigorin aka "Brown Fox" [now working for Mainland China] when he kidnaps Stockwell "Aka Black wolf" to find the jet. Years before Under imprisonment in Cuba Trigorin had been "broken" and betrayed Stockwell. If they cannot find and free Stockwell to speak a code within 36 hours, they lose any hope of securing their pardon. Through Hannibal and Murdock's usual craziness, they manage to locate Stockwell; Stockwell and Ivan have a face to face confrontation in which Ivan is killed in a truck crash on a Hollywood Movie set. With less than 10 minutes left, Stockwell speaks the code, securing the A-Team for another half-day. In a twist ending Hannibal reveals to Stockwell the real jets hiding place. Murdock's job: Frank Sinatra impersonator. also poses as a Chinese Food Delivery boy at the Chinese embassy Special Guest Star: David McCallum as Ivan Trigorin. Note: David McCallum and Robert Vaughn were the stars of The Man from U.N.C.L.E., to which this episode's title is a reference. Date given on Hollywood movie slate is 11-4-1986 Nov 4, 1986
92	7	"Alive at Five"	Craig R. Baxley	Bill Nuss	November 7, 1986
Face plans to leave the A-Team during the upcoming mission involving organized crime vs labor unions, no longer believing that they can secure a pardon (though a nightmare about Stockwell is what actually causes it, and even makes Frankie think that Stockwell might be able to infiltrate their dreams). Though Face makes the A-Team start thinking that Stockwell may be lying to them about a pardon just to keep using them, he is ignored. Face finds himself returning to the team in order to help a reporter after trying to run away numerous times. Note: Stockwell keeps a "Thank You" from the reporter off the air to keep the fact he faked the A-Team's deaths at the start of the season a secret.
93	8	"Family Reunion"	James Darren	Steven L. Sears	November 14, 1986
In a special episode of which the ending was voted on by viewers, the A-Team must help a former political advisor, A.J. Bancroft (played by Jeff Corey), to reunite with his lost daughter, Ellen Bancroft (played by Clare Kirkconnell), in exchange for a diary with large political ramifications. Unbeknownst to Face, the advisor claims to be his father, a fact Murdock learns of during the course of the episode, causing a dilemma for Murdock on whether or not he should tell his friend. He blackmails Stockwell to investigate into the matter, threatening to withhold the advisor's intel. In the end, the advisor dies of natural causes and Murdock reveals the truth, infuriating Face. While mourning, Face receives the call from Stockwell, confirming that the man really was his father; Face comforts his half-sister. Murdock's job: Turkey farmer Note: First mention of Murdock's girlfriend, Erica.
94	9	"Point of No Return"	Bob Bralver	Burt Pearl	November 18, 1986
The A-Team travels to Hong Kong after Hannibal goes missing in action during a solo mission to locate a nuclear core; adding to the problem is that if not stored properly, it will slowly poison anyone within its vicinity. With the assistance of Stockwell, they hope to A) complete Hannibal's mission in time and B) find and save Hannibal himself. The mission is successful, and Stockwell gives the A-Team 12 hours of vacation time as a reward for doing things his way (since Hannibal was not around to challenge him for once). Guest stars: Soon Tek-Oh, Nancy Kwan, Rosalind Chao and Dustin Nguyen. Note: First time the A-Team is led by Stockwell. This episode aired on Tuesday at 9:00 PM (after Matlock).
95	10	"The Crystal Skull"	Michael O'Herlihy	Bill Nuss	November 28, 1986
The A-Team become mixed up in a fight between two warring tribes concerning a religious artifact they secured for Stockwell. With the artifact in Murdock's hands, the tribe mistake him for a god. At the same time, scammers attempt to take advantage of the tribe's mistake. In the end, Stockwell believes the A-Team was wasting time (unaware of what was really keeping them) and revokes the reward he promised them.
96	11	"The Spy Who Mugged Me"	Michael O'Herlihy	Paul Bernbaum	December 12, 1986
Murdock must assume the guise of a James Bond-type secret agent named Logan Ross in order to stop a professional assassin known as the Jaguar from completing his next mission.
97	12	"The Grey Team"	Michael O'Herlihy	Tom Blomquist	December 30, 1986
A government agent is to give fake documents on the "Star Wars" project to a Russian in a sting operation; however, his daughter overhears him and thinks he's actually betraying America, so she steals them and hides out with her elderly friend. The A-Team is called in to get the files back so the sting operation can go off without a hitch. Hannibal has Murdock pose as a doctor with knowledge of the process to lure the Russians. Meanwhile, Frankie, B.A. and Face are forced to deal with Federal agents sent by the government to find the girl, and a retirement home's worth of elderly people mistaking them for enemies. Eventually, Hannibal's insane plan allows the team to lure in their enemies and trap them. Fed up with Stockwell and knowing he can't risk a scandal by having them arrested, Hannibal has the A-Team quit and go back to freelance. Murdock wonders what the future holds without a presidential pardon; Hannibal assures him that they'll have many more years of their zany adventures. Note: This episode aired on its popular Tuesday night slot at 8:00 PM. While this episode was the penultimate episode to air, it is, in fact, the final episode produced for the series.
98	13	"Without Reservations"	John Peter Kousakis	Bill Nuss	March 8, 1987
When dining at a restaurant where Murdock is employed, Face and Frankie try to prevent three mobsters from being able to assassinate an important customer coming in later. However, a hitman shoots Face, leaving him badly wounded and nearing death. Murdock and Frankie are left helpless as they are also taken hostage. Murdock's lunacy manages to concoct a way to get a message out; he writes "HELP" on a pizza that B.A. picks up, allowing him and Hannibal to try to rescue the group; however a corrupt cop takes a hostage to permit the A Team to be captured and the "hit" to go on. Hannibal however manages to concoct a plan that turns the tables on the three hitmen being knocked out cold by the A Team; preventing the killing from taking place and allowing Hannibal, B.A. and Frankie to get Face to a hospital in time. Guest Stars: Mills Watson and Marc Alaimo Note: Although this was the last episode of the series to be broadcast, it is, in fact, the penultimate episode. It was aired out of order more than two months after "The Grey Team", for reasons that remain unclear. A visual clue of the order of the episodes is that in "The Grey Team", Murdock is seen wearing a shirt that says "Fini", the French word for "Finished", whilst in this episode he is seen wearing a shirt that reads "Almost Fini".
