= Mmoloki Chrystie =

English actor

Mmoloki Chrystie is an English actor, perhaps best recognised for playing the football-crazed, not-too-bright Frazer "Frazz" Davis in the BAFTA award-winning Central Television / Children's ITV comedy-drama Press Gang. Prior to that, Chrystie had played Kevin Baylon in another children's favourite, Grange Hill, from 1984 to 1987. Kevin was best friend of 'Zammo' McGuire (Lee MacDonald), and so featured heavily in the infamous Zammo "Just Say No" drugs storyline and campaign.

After Press Gang ended in 1993, Chrystie left acting, but was still involved in the business, working as an assistant director on a small-budget film called Rage, and later setting up his own production company. He wrote and directed the 2000 short film Underbelly. In 2003, Chrystie was one of a number of former Grange Hill cast members approached by presenter Justin Lee Collins to appear in Bring Back..., a Channel 4 programme designed to re-unite cast members to perform the Just Say No single. Chrystie was one of the few people who declined to take part, but, as part of his production company, submitted his own produced short film to the programme about the campaign's trip to America to meet Nancy Reagan.

== TV ==
- The Bill
- Press Gang
- Casualty
- The Comic Strip Presents...
- Grange Hill
