= Nadia Chambers =

British actress

Nadia Chambers is a Welsh actress. She is the youngest of four children. Chambers moved to London in 1981 to attend stage school.

== Career ==
From 1982 to 1985, Chambers played the role of Annette Firman in the television series Grange Hill. She came to be best known for her appearance in Brookside, playing troublesome teenager Claudia Nolan from 1986 to 1994. She also appeared as Miss Anne de Bourgh in the 1995 mini series Pride and Prejudice and made guest appearances in episodes of The Bill.

== Acting roles ==
- Pride and Prejudice as Anne de Bourgh (1995)
- The Bill
  - Your Shout as Trish (1991)
  - Pickup as Tracey (1989)
- Little Dorrit as Agnes (1988)
- Brookside as Claudia Nolan (1986-1991, 1993–1994)
- Grange Hill as Annette Firman (1982–1985).
