= Erkan Mustafa =

British actor and television presenter (born 1970)

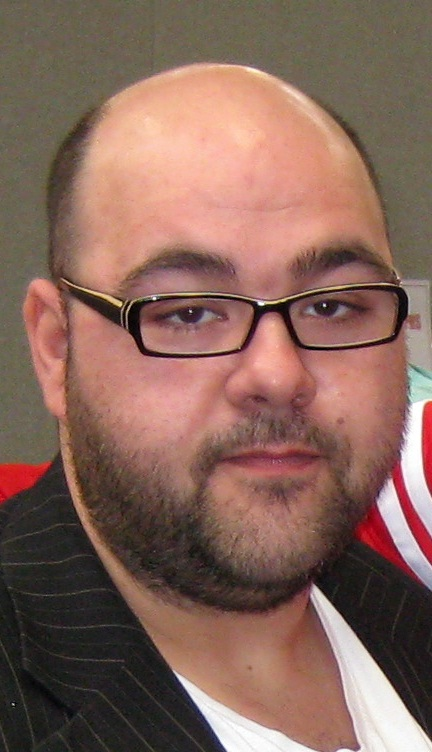
- Mustafa in 2005
- Born: Erkan Mustafa; 14 May 1970 (age 56); London, UK
- Occupation: Actor
- Years active: 1982–present

Erkan Mustafa (born 14 May 1970) is a British actor and television presenter of Turkish Cypriot descent, noted for the part of Roland Browning in the BBC children's television drama series Grange Hill (1982–1987).

Other parts include "Enormous Orphan" in the television comedy film Blackadder's Christmas Carol (1988) and "Otto" in the sitcom Chef! (1991).

In 1993, Channel 4's The Word tracked him down to a friend's record shop where he was helping out. He appeared on This Morning's Grange Hill reunion in 1998. In 2005, he appeared in the reunion programme Bring Back Grange Hill.

Mustafa occasionally works in television with fellow Grange Hill star Lee MacDonald, including as a presenter for E4 Music.

In October 2009, Mustafa hosted a Grange Hill cast reunion at Sound nightclub in London's Leicester Square.

He acted in The All-Nighter, a ten-minute short film released in 2018, along with Ronald Forfar and Martin Hancock.

== Filmography ==
Year	Film	Role	Notes
1982–1987	Grange Hill	Roland 'Roly' Browning	74 episodes
1988	Blackadder's Christmas Carol	Enormous Orphan	television comedy film
1993	Chef!	Otto	7 episodes
2005	The Bill	Inquest Jury Member	1 episode
2005	Bring Back... Grange Hill	Himself	television documentary
2005	18 Stone of Idiot	Himself	1 episode
2008	I Am Paul Baillie	Paul Baillie	television documentary
2008	TV's 50 Hardest Men	Himself	television documentary
2012	Celebrity Juice	Himself	Magazine Head
2012 and 2015	Pointless Celebrities	Himself	with Lee MacDonald
2012–13	Soccer A.M.	Himself	Hairy Strikers/Record Attempts
