= Alison Bettles =

English actress

- Born: 22 April 1969 (age 56); Essex, England
- Occupation: Actor
- Years active: 1981–2001
- Notable credit: Fay Lucas in Grange Hill

Alison Bettles (born 22 April 1969) is a retired English television actress. She is known for playing Fay Lucas in BBC's Grange Hill for six series (1982–1987).

== Career ==
Bettles was recruited into acting at the age of eight by Sylvia Young of the Sylvia Young Theatre School. As a child, Bettles appeared in various television advertisements, which included a public information film for the Green Cross Code with Bob Carolgees in 1981.

She is known for her childhood role in the Children's BBC drama, Grange Hill. Bettles played the prominent character Fay Lucas between 1982 and 1987, who was most notable for having an affair with one of her teachers, Mr King (David Straun). Bettles was one of various Grange Hill actors to feature in the UK's Just Say No anti-drug campaign. The cast recorded a song (also entitled "Just Say No"), which was released as a single, and reached number 5 in April 1986. Bettles was also featured on a special music album released by the Grange Hill cast, with songs written by Steve Wright, who composed the theme tune for Channel 4's Brookside. Bettles sang a solo track entitled "School Love", which was based on her character's doomed relationship with Mr. King. In 2005, Bettles was reunited with some of her former Grange Hill castmates in Justin Lee Collins's Channel 4 documentary, Bring Back...Grange Hill, which saw them perform their top ten hit, Just Say No, in front of an audience at the Hammersmith Palais.

Aside from her Grange Hill music projects, Bettles also sang on the charity single "Let It Be", released by Ferry Aid in 1987 to raise money for victims of the Zeebrugge ferry disaster. In 1988 Bettles appeared in a spin-off of the popular BBC soap opera, EastEnders. The spin-off, entitled CivvyStreet, was set during the second world war, and looked back on the early life of some of EastEnders' senior residents. Bettles played a young Ethel Skinner. Among Bettles' other credits are: ITV's police drama The Bill (1988) (credited as 'Alison Beetles'); No Strings (1989); Closing Numbers (1993); Ostatni Accord (1994) and London's Burning (2001).

Bettles gave up performing in the 1990s to marry and bring up her family. During her time away from acting Bettles qualified as a beauty therapist, and in 2005 she set up a specialist freight forwarding company called Kenvale Recruitment.

== Personal life ==
Bettles was born in 1969 to a mother who worked as a chaperone for the Grange Hill series from its inception in 1978 to 2002. She and her two brothers grew up in Essex, where Bettles attended Aveley Comprehensive.

Bettles is married and has four children—three boys and a daughter. Bettles' children have also taken to performing, with her son Albert Valentine appearing in the Doctor Who episodes, The Empty Child and The Doctor Dances. Another son, Arthur, has appeared in EastEnders.
