= Dulice Liecier =

British actress (born 1965)

Dulice Liecier (born 7 April 1965, Stepney, London), is a British actress. Liecier played Precious Matthews in the Children's BBC serial Grange Hill, and Ava in the 1987 James Bond film, The Living Daylights.

== Career ==
Liecier was one of the children who sang on Pink Floyd’s 1979 hit single "Another Brick In The Wall" when at Islington Green School. Liecier started her acting career in Grange Hill as Precious Matthews, who she played for 35 episodes over a period of four years. In 1985, she appeared in nine episodes of EastEnders as a stripper, Sheena Mennell, who appears in Walford when her cab breaks down and befriends punk Mary Smith (Linda Davidson).

She also appeared in the television series Call Me Mister as Julie Columbus in 1986. She has had roles in the films My Beautiful Laundrette (1985), Half Moon Street (1986) and Stormy Monday (1988), and in 1987 she played a CIA agent, Ava, in the James Bond film The Living Daylights.

== Filmography ==
- Grange Hill (1981-1985) - Precious Matthews
- My Beautiful Laundrette (1985) - Girl in Disco
- EastEnders (1985) - Sheena Mennell
- Half Moon Street (1986) - Jamaican Escort-girl
- Call Me Mister (1986) - Julie Columbus
- The Living Daylights (1987) - Ava
- Stormy Monday (1988) - Carol
