= Lee MacDonald =

English actor (born 1968)

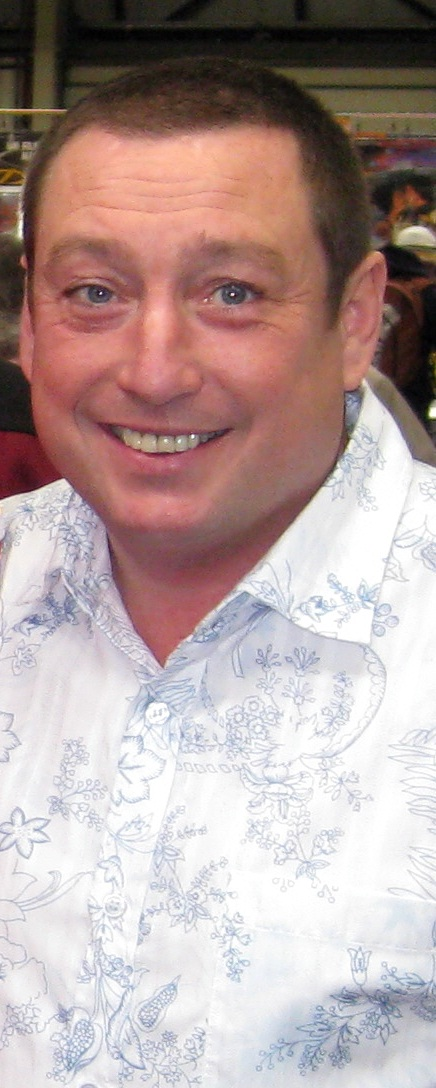
- 2011
- Born: Lee MacDonald; 21 June 1968 (age 57); England
- Occupations: Actor, locksmith
- Years active: 1979–present
- Known for: Grange Hill

Lee MacDonald (born 21 June 1968) is an English actor, who is known for his role as Zammo McGuire in the BBC drama Grange Hill. Since then, he has made cameo appearances on Birds of a Feather and The Bill. In 2019, he began appearing in the BBC soap opera EastEnders as Terry.

== Career ==
MacDonald became introverted at age five after his elder sister died, which led to a teacher at his primary school suggesting he attend an after-school drama club. This was the Anna Scher Theatre and resulted in minor television roles before an audition for Grange Hill.

He appeared in The Bill ("A Willing Victim" (S09 E66)) as Martin Buckley, a boxer, with Melissa Wilks playing his wife Sandra.

He appeared in the Sky 1 show Cirque de Celebrité until he was voted out on the fourth show. He was, however, invited back when Sophie Anderton left due to injury, but was again voted out on the seventh show.

MacDonald filmed a pilot for a series entitled Cabbies for ITV: he also appeared as a travel correspondent on BroadbandTV.

In October 2008, MacDonald appeared in BBC Three's Celebrity Scissorhands, where celebrities learned to cut hair and do other beauty treatments, raising money for BBC Children in Need.

In November 2015, MacDonald took part in a "Child Stars" edition of Pointless Celebrities, with fellow Grange Hill star Erkan Mustafa as his teammate. In September 2016, he appeared on an edition of ITV's Who's Doing the Dishes?.

In April 2019, it was announced that MacDonald would appear in the BBC soap opera EastEnders as Terry.

In July 2019, MacDonald appeared as a guest artist on a single called "We Are London". The song was by British band The Knowledge. The video for the song also featured British actress Maureen Lipman and BBC Radio presenter and journalist Duncan Barkes.

On 30 November 2019, MacDonald surprised Robert Rinder as a guest in the "Midnight Gameshow" of Michael McIntyre's Big Show.

In a special Christmas Day episode of podcast White Wine Question Time, released in December 2020, MacDonald told host Kate Thornton how the role of Zammo had typecast him in his acting career and that he was jealous of other Grange Hill colleagues like John Alford doing so well.

In addition to acting, MacDonald has worked for many years as a locksmith in Wallington, Surrey.

In June 2024, MacDonald announced that he had been diagnosed with a form of skin cancer after noticing an "unusual spot" on his face.
