= Grange Hill series 29 =

Grange Hill
- Season 29
- No. of episodes: 20

Release
- Original network: CBBC
- Original release: 7 November – 2 December 2005

Season chronology
- ← Previous; Series 28 Next → Series 30

The twenty-ninth series of the British television drama series Grange Hill began broadcasting on 7 November 2005, before ending on 2 December 2005 on CBBC. It was later broadcast on BBC One in February and March 2006. The series follows the lives of the staff and Student of the eponymous school, an inner-city London comprehensive school. It consists of twenty episodes.

== Cast ==
=== Students ===
- Hollie-Jay Bowes as Dawn O'Malley
- Chantelle Latham as Kat Simpson
- Matthew Buckley as Martin Miller
- Sammy O'Grady as Kathy McIlroy
- Kacey Barnfield as Maddie Gilks
- Tom Hudson as Baz Wainwright
- Holly Quin-Ankrah as Karen Young
- James Wignall as Max Humphries
- Reece Noi as Taylor Mitchell
- Rob Norbury as Donnie Briscoe
- Rebecca-Anne Withey as Holly Parsons
- Amber Hodgkiss as Eleanor Smith
- Jonathan Dixon as Mooey Humphries
- Chris Crookall as Andy Turner
- Max Friswell as Jeremy Bishop
- Lucas Lindo as Abel Benson
- Chris Perry-Metcalf as Togger Johnson
- Kirsten Cassidy as Tanya Young
- Daniella Fray as Emma Bolton
- Jack McMullen as Tigger Johnson
- Alex Sheldon as Ed Booth
- Holly Mai as Sammy Lee
- Mia Smith as Chloe Moore
- Darcy Isa as Andrea O'Malley
- Josh Brown as Alex Pickering
- Georgia May Foote as Alison Simmons

=== Teachers ===
- Jacqueline Boatswain as Mrs Bassinger
- Edward Baker-Duly as Mr Chris Malachy
- Simon O'Brien as Mr Walter "Wally" Scott
- Terri Dwyer as Miss Adams
- Paul Gilmore as Mr McDonnell
- Kim Hartman as Miss Hilda Rawlinson

=== Others ===
- Mark Entwhistle as Mr Owen Wainwright
- Gillian Perry as Mrs Bolton
- Philip Hazelby as Mr Bolton
- Danny Lawrence as Mr Benson

== Episodes ==
#	Episode	Writer	Director	Original airdate
1	Episode One	Phil Redmond	Paul Murphy	7 November 2005
The school gates open for the first day of a new school year. Togger and his friends suddenly find themselves interested in the opposite sex.
2	Episode Two	Heather Robson	Paul Murphy	8 November 2005
Tanya isn't impressed by the PE kit. Martin falls out with Maddie.
3	Episode Three	Neil Jones	Chris Johnston	9 November 2005
Alex and Alison's friendship hits problems. Holly is saved from having an accident by Baz.
4	Episode Four	Phil Redmond		10 November 2005
Togger finds himself in trouble. Tanya continues her campaign for an improved PE kit.
5	Episode Five	Phil Redmond		11 November 2005
Togger and his friends find their lives in danger on the day of the wedding.
6	Episode Six	Andy Lynch	Paul Murphy	14 November 2005
Tanya decides to stand for the school council.
7	Episode Seven	Sarah Daniels	Daikin Marsh	15 November 2005
Preparations get under way for the school's first ever GP. When Togger tries to help Tanya get elected to the school council his plan goes wrong. After saying goodbye to Martin, Maddie leaves the school.
8	Episode Eight	Kaddy Benyon	Daikin Marsh	16 November 2005
The school's GP gets underway, Holly and Martin persuade a local company to part with an incinerator, and Tanya is disillusioned at her first school council meeting.
9	Episode Nine	Neil Jones	Jayne Chard	17 November 2005
Togger comes to school with a black eye.
10	Episode Ten	Richard Burke	Jayne Chard	18 November 2005
Togger continues to find himself in trouble.
11	Episode Eleven	Kaddy Benyon	Chris Johnston	21 November 2005
Tanya is concerned how Emma will react when she finds out that she is now seeing Baz.
12	Episode Twelve	Sarah Daniels	Chris Johnston	22 November 2005
Tanya and Togger continue in their quest to get the school's PE kit improved. Karen isn't impressed when she learns that Baz is seeing Tanya.
13	Episode Thirteen	Heather Robson	Paul Murphy	23 November 2005
Tanya thinks about how her relationship with Baz is going.
14	Episode Fourteen	Richard Burke	Paul Murphy	24 November 2005
Taylor clashes with Max. Ed and Alex find themselves falling out with Tigger.
15	Episode Fifteen	Andy Lynch	Daikin Marsh	25 November 2005
The first showing of Togger's film is broadcast. Tanya decides to cancel her date with Baz.
16	Episode Sixteen	Kaddy Benyon	Daikin Marsh	28 November 2005
Chloe and Andrea find themselves in trouble.
17	Episode Seventeen	Heather Robson	Dusan Lazarevic	29 November 2005
Togger finds himself in trouble when he states a protest over the state of the toilets.
18	Episode Eighteen	Sarah Daniels	Dusan Lazarevic	30 November 2005
Emma ends up returning. Alex makes some smoothies for the restaurant. Tanya is asked out by Jeremy. The P.E referendum takes place at the school. Baz ends up fighting with Donnie.
19	Episode Nineteen	Neil Jones	Chris Johnston	1 December 2005
Mooey has no intention of going home without the prize money where he wins the remote control car race or not.
20	Episode Twenty	Kaddy Benyon	Chris Johnston	2 December 2005
The school term comes to a close and Martin proves the wind turbine project to be a cheat. Mrs. Bassinger offers Taylor a job. Togger and Tanya grow closer.

== DVD release ==
The twenty-ninth series of Grange Hill has never been released on DVD as of 2014.
