= Grange Hill series 28 =

Grange Hill
- Season 28
- No. of episodes: 20

Release
- Original network: BBC One
- Original release: 10 January – 23 March 2005

Season chronology
- ← Previous; Series 27 Next → Series 29

The twenty-eighth series of the British television drama series Grange Hill began broadcasting on 10 January 2005, before ending on 23 March 2005 on BBC One. The series follows the lives of the staff and Students of the eponymous school, an inner-city London comprehensive school. It consists of twenty episodes.

== Cast ==
=== Students ===
- Colin White as Spencer Hargreaves
- Hollie-Jay Bowes as Dawn O'Malley
- Chantelle Latham as Kat Simpson
- Matthew Buckley as Martin Miller
- Sammy O'Grady as Kathy McIlroy
- Kacey Barnfield as Maddie Gilks
- Tom Hudson as Baz Wainwright
- Holly Quin-Ankrah as Karen Young
- James Wignall as Max Humphries
- Reece Noi as Taylor Mitchell
- Max Friswell as Jeremy Bishop
- Lucas Lindo as Abel Benson
- Chris Perry-Metcalf as Togger Johnson
- Kirsten Cassidy as Tanya Young
- Daniella Fray as Emma Bolton
- Lauren Bunney as Annie Wainwright
- Jack McMullen as Tigger Johnson
- Alex Sheldon as Ed Booth
- Holly Mai as Sammy Lee
- Mia Smith as Chloe Moore
- Darcy Isa as Andrea O'Malley
- Josh Brown as Alex Pickering
- Georgia May Foote as Alison Simmons

=== Teachers ===
- Jacqueline Boatswain as Mrs Bassinger
- Edward Baker-Duly as Mr Chris Malachy
- Simon O'Brien as Mr Walter "Wally" Scott
- Terri Dwyer as Miss Adams
- Paul Gilmore as Mr McDonnell

=== Others ===
- Mark Entwhistle as Mr Owen Wainwright

== Episodes ==
#	Episode	Writer	Director	Original airdate
1	Episode One	Richard Burke	Peter Hoar	10 January 2005
The day before the new school year begins, the new first formers are shown round. Alex's remote controlled blimp causes chaos. Togger ends up being blamed for his younger brother's actions.
2	Episode Two	Heather Robson	Peter Hoar	12 January 2005
Tanya's braided hair and ankle tattoo don't go unnoticed by the staff. Togger and his friends have to email a French school to tell them all about themselves.
3	Episode Three	Neil Jones	Craig Lines	17 January 2005
Tigger discovers the Wannabies' stash of sweets ready to be sold in the unofficial school tuck shop as he tries to get Alex's car back. Chloe works out what has happened and she ends up telling Mr. Malachay that Tigger has been bullying Alex.
4	Episode Four	Sarah Daniels	Craig Lines	19 January 2005
The Students votes for the name of the new radio station. A healthy eating campaign gets underway at the school seeing the Students swapping sweets for fruit.
5	Episode Five	Matthew Evans	Tessa Hoffe	24 January 2005
Baz has got other things on his mind as the school holds football trials. Mrs Bassinger agrees to allow Spencer to make a film instead of the school play being held this year.
6	Episode Six	Mark P Holloway	Tessa Hoffe	26 January 2005
As Kathy and Maddie argue it ends up being accidentally broadcast over the school radio. Taylor becomes the first DJ after stepping in. Ed forgets that it is Alex's birthday.
7	Episode Seven	Andy Lynch	Peter Hoar	31 January 2005
Abel manages to get through to the Football Academy but Togger fails to. The school votes in favour of producing My Fair Lady much to Spencer's horror.
8	Episode Eight	Sarah Daniels	Peter Hoar	2 February 2005
Tanya ends up being banned from the French Exchange after venting her feelings over the school radio.
9	Episode Nine	Mark P Holloway	Craig Lines	7 February 2005
Alex and Alison manage to get out of swimming practice. Dawn takes control of the script for My Fair Lady. Annie starts uses a stolen credit card.
10	Episode Ten	Neil Jones	Craig Lines	9 February 2005
Tanya's secret meeting with Jean ends up becoming a terrifying ordeal for her.
11	Episode Eleven	Richard Burke	Tessa Hoffe	14 February 2005
Internet access is banned at the school following Tanya's ordeal. Maddie attempts to make Karen see Taylor's unreliability.
12	Episode Twelve	Matthew Evans		16 February 2005
Tanya believes that she has seen her attacker at the school. Alex has a swimming lesson. Annie's lies about her credit cards become more complicated.
13	Episode Thirteen	Matthew Evans	Chris Johnston	21 February 2005
Jeremy's hopes are dashed after he's fired from the school production. Alex's ego is boosted by Alison and Ed after they persuade him to go on the adventure trip.
14	Episode Fourteen	Neil Jones	Peter Hoar	23 February 2005
Chloe spoils the hunting expedition and is forced to pay the price on the adventure trip. Baz's dispute with Max grows and it leads to an accident happening.
15	Episode Fifteen	Andy Lynch	Peter Hoar	28 February 2005
Alex manages to put his foot in his mouth after Alison's secret ends up being revealed. Togger comes to Tanya's rescue after she suffers with a panic attack in a maze.
16	Episode Sixteen	Sarah Daniels	Chris Johnston	2 March 2005
Alex fills his bag with books and secures it to his back and heads off to the pool. It is down to Spencer to try and save him in time.
17	Episode Seventeen	Matthew Evans	Paul Murphy	14 March 2005
After Alex returns to school he renews his friendships. Tanya contacts Lucy and attempts to arrange a meeting with her to find out about more about the person who attacked her.
18	Episode Eighteen	Mark P Holloway	Paul Murphy	16 March 2005
After Annie brings to school a large amount of money she manages to lose it. Tanya is finally able to get Lucy to agree to meet with her.
19	Episode Nineteen	Heather Robinson	Tessa Hoffe	21 March 2005
The school film has its premier and the unofficial "No Malarky" video ends up being shown. Some loose ends are tied up.
20	Episode Twenty	Richard Burke	Tessa Hoffe	23 March 2005
Abel decides to leave the Football Academy. Spencer asks Kathy out on a date. Annie's desperation sees her stealing a laptop from the school.

== DVD release ==
The twenty-eighth series of Grange Hill has never been released on DVD as of 2014.
