= Grange Hill series 26 =

Grange Hill
- Season 26
- No. of episodes: 20

Release
- Original network: BBC One
- Original release: 28 January – 3 April 2003

Season chronology
- ← Previous; Series 25 Next → Series 27

The twenty-sixth series of the British television drama series Grange Hill began broadcasting on 28 January 2003, before ending on 3 April 2003 on BBC One. The series follows the lives of the staff and Students of the eponymous school, an inner-city comprehensive school. As production had moved to Liverpool under Phil Redmond's Mersey Television, the school was no longer set explicitly in London. It consists of twenty episodes.

== Cast ==
=== Students ===
- John Joseph as Ian Hudson
- Amanda Fahy as Shannon Parks
- Jessica Staveley-Taylor as Leah Stewart
- Tom Graham as Nick Edwards
- Sarah Lawrence as Mel Adams
- Colin White as Spencer Hargreaves
- Arnold Oceng as Calvin Braithwaite
- Jalpa Patel as Anika Modi
- Lindsey Ray as Amy Davenport
- Matthew Buckley as Martin Miller
- Sammy O'Grady as Kathy McIlroy
- Kacey Barnfield as Maddie Gilks
- Tom Hudson as Baz Wainwright
- Holly Quin-Ankrah as Karen Young
- James Wignall as Max Humphries
- Max Friswell as Jeremy Bishop
- Lucas Lindo as Abel Benson
- Chris Perry-Metcalf as Togger Johnson
- Kirsten Cassidy as Tanya Young
- Daniella Fray as Emma Bolton
- Lauren Bunney as Annie Wainwright

=== Teachers ===
- Stuart Organ as Mr Peter Robson
- Jacqueline Boatswain as Mrs Bassinger
- Edward Baker-Duly as Mr Chris Malachy
- Simon O'Brien as Mr Walter "Wally" Scott
- Terri Dwyer as Miss Adams
- Nikki Grosse as Miss Dyson

=== Others ===
- Malcolm Tomlinson as Mr Stewart
- Natalie Forbes as Mrs Stewart
- Mark Entwhistle as Mr Owen Wainwright
- Todd Carty as Tucker Jenkins

== Episodes ==
#	Episode	Writer	Director	Original airdate
1	Episode One	Richard Burke	David Richardson	28 January 2003
Tucker Jenkins gives his nephew Togger and Andy a lift to their new school. Jeremy becomes an instant target for bully Mooey Humphries. Miss Dyson isn't impressed by Tanya's lip ring.
2	Episode Two	Neil Jones	David Richardson	30 January 2003
Leah and Shannon decide to play women's football. Maddie becomes frustrated by with Baz's secretive home life. Abel steals Jeremy's football boots.
3	Episode Three	Kaddy Benyon	Chris Corcoran	4 February 2003
Baz ends up injuring his leg as he jumps out of the upstairs window at home. Emma wants to be Tanya's best friend. Plans are announced by Mr. Robson to try and raise £50,000 for new technology at the school.
4	Episode Four	Sarah Daniels	Chris Corcoran	6 February 2003
Togger and Abel have an unscheduled swim in the school swimming pool and Abel's clothes end up vanishing.
5	Episode Five	Richard Burke	David Andrews	11 February 2003
Togger and Abel have an unscheduled swim in the school swimming pool and Abel's clothes end up vanishing.
6	Episode Six	Si Spencer	David Andrews	13 February 2003
The year seven Students go ghost hunting. Mr. Robson reveals that some of the school playing fields will be sold off to raise funds. Baz returns to school.
7	Episode Seven	Sarah Daniels	Murilo Pasta	18 February 2003
Annie ends up taking the blame for a missing costume. The year seven Students lesson in pancake ends up in a food fight.
8	Episode Eight	Neil Jones	Murilo Pasta	20 February 2003
Mr. Malachay is impressed by Mr. Wainwright at Parents' Evening. Togger discovers that there has been someone living in the damaged building. Josh manages to makes a fool of himself. Leah discovers that her mother has been seeing Mr. Malachay.
9	Episode Nine	Si Spencer	Chris Corcoran	25 February 2003
Josh's Beckham hairstyle causes him problems. Rumours about Leah and Mr. Malachay spread around the school. Togger and the other Year 7's use CCTV footage to try to get a glimpse of the mysterious squatter.
10	Episode Ten	Kaddy Benyon	Chris Corcoran	27 February 2003
The Year Seven Students try to get to know the hidden boy. Anika is finally asked out on a date by Josh. Leah decides to leave school for good.
11	Episode Eleven	Sarah Daniels	David Andrews	4 March 2003
Emma manages to ruin Tanya and Annie's friendship. Tranter becomes ill. Shannon ends up showing interest in somebody new in the Sixth Form.
12	Episode Twelve	Richard Burke	David Andrews	6 March 2003
After Mr. Wainwright hits Annie, Baz is determined to see him back on his medication. Tranter is discovered unconscious outside the school.
13	Episode Thirteen	Kaddy Benyon	Murilo Pasta	11 March 2003
The newest Underpants Dare involves the Head's bow-tie wearing skeleton. Amy and Anika fall out. Tranter receives a visitor at the hospital.
14	Episode Fourteen	Richard Burke	Murilo Pasta	13 March 2003
Tanya ends up beginning to follow the school rules literally. Baz is attacked by his father.
15	Episode Fifteen	Matthew Evans	Chris Corcoran	18 March 2003
Tanya takes part in the latest Underpants Dare. Mel replaces Shannon in the school football team. Amy is finding history classes too difficult and misses the support of her mother.
16	Episode Sixteen	Sarah Daniels	Chris Corcoran	20 March 2003
Tanya's apple pie doesn't go to plan in Food Technology. Baz attempts to try and win Maddie back. Shannon and Anika both audition for the part of Juliet in the school play.
17	Episode Seventeen	Si Spencer	Paul Murphy	25 March 2003
Amy is worried at her examination. Baz tries a different approach to try and win Maddie back.
18	Episode Eighteen	Richard Burke	Paul Murphy	27 March 2003
There is an ulterior purpose for Tranter wanting to join the Year 7 Students on their trip to Chester. The girls’ football team have an awful away fixture. Anika and Nick rehearse for upcoming the school play
19	Episode Nineteen	Kaddy Benyon	David Richardson	1 April 2003
Maddie spends some uncomfortable time alone with Baz's dad. Shannon finds out the truth about Nick and Mel. Josh and Martin's Staff Room web cam ends up being found.
20	Episode Twenty	Neil Jones	David Richardson	3 April 2003
The school sports day is held with Ian's team hoping to beat the staff. Jeremy ends up standing up to Mooey. Martin and Kathy share a kiss. Josh discovers who his admirer is. Mr. Robson becomes a dad.

== Production and casting ==
Series 26 is the first series to be filmed at Childwall Studios in Liverpool, Merseyside, and produced by the show creator's, Phil Redmond, production company, Mersey Television. Liverpool City Council's film office helped to find locations for exterior filming, including Norris Green housing estate and three schools: Croxteth Comprehensive School, Holly Lodge Girls' College and Ashfield School.

Returning cast members included: Stuart Organ (Peter Robson), John Joseph (Ian Hudson), Amanda Fahy (Shannon Parks), Jessica Staveley-Taylor (Leah Stewart), Colin White (Spencer Hargreaves), Arnold Oceng (Calvin Braithwaite), Jalpa Patel (Anika Modi), Lindsey Ray (Amy Davenport), Matthew Buckley (Martin Miller), Sammy O'Grady (Kathy McIlroy), Kacey Barnfield (Maddie Gilks) and Shane Leonidas (Josh Irving). The new cast members were from the North of England. Todd Carty made a guest appearance in the first episode and Chris Perry-Metcalf was cast as Tucker's nephew, Patrick "Togger" Johnson. Perry-Metcalf had two auditions and secured the role two days before filming. Perry-Metcalf described Togger as a "bit of a rebel" who believes "he doesn't have to work and that school's just for messing around and getting people into trouble." He added that working with Carty was "amazing." Following Staveley-Taylor's departure in episode 10, Tom Graham and Sarah Lawrence joined as Nick Edwards and Mel Edwards. Holly Quin-Ankrah and Kirsten Cassidy joined the series as step-sisters Karen and Tanya Young. Quin Ankrah received no acting role prior to gaining the part of Karen at the age of 14. Describing her character as "evil", Cassidy said her role is a "good part to play."

== DVD release ==
The twenty-sixth series of Grange Hill has never been released on DVD as of 2014.
