= Grange Hill series 27 =

Grange Hill
- Season 27
- No. of episodes: 20

Release
- Original network: BBC One
- Original release: 6 January – 11 March 2004

Season chronology
- ← Previous; Series 26 Next → Series 28

The twenty-seventh series of the British television drama series Grange Hill began broadcasting on 6 January 2004, before ending on 11 March 2004 on BBC One. The series follows the lives of the staff and Students of the eponymous school, an inner-city comprehensive school. It consists of twenty episodes.

== Cast ==
=== Students ===
- John Joseph as Ian Hudson
- Amanda Fahy as Shannon Parks
- Tom Graham as Nick Edwards
- Sarah Lawrence as Mel Adams
- Colin White as Spencer Hargreaves
- Arnold Oceng as Calvin Braithwaite
- Jalpa Patel as Anika Modi
- Matthew Buckley as Martin Miller
- Sammy O'Grady as Kathy McIlroy
- Kacey Barnfield as Maddie Gilks
- Tom Hudson as Baz Wainwright
- Holly Quin-Ankrah as Karen Young
- James Wignall as Max Humphries
- Reece Noi as Taylor Mitchell
- Max Friswell as Jeremy Bishop
- Lucas Lindo as Abel Benson
- Chris Perry-Metcalf as Togger Johnson
- Kirsten Cassidy as Tanya Young
- Daniella Fray as Emma Bolton
- Lauren Bunney as Annie Wainwright
- Jack McMullen as Tigger Johnson

=== Teachers ===
- Jacqueline Boatswain as Mrs Bassinger
- Edward Baker-Duly as Mr Chris Malachy
- Simon O'Brien as Mr Walter "Wally" Scott
- Terri Dwyer as Miss Adams
- Paul Gilmore as Mr McDonnell
- Nikki Grosse as Miss Dyson

=== Others ===
- Mark Entwhistle as Mr Owen Wainwright

== Episodes ==
| # | Episode | Writer | Director | Original airdate |
|---|---|---|---|---|
| 1 | Episode One | Kaddy Benyon | Paul Murphy | 6 January 2004 |
Tanya is wound up by Togger with the assistance of a chicken's foot. Maddie acts overprotective towards Baz. Taylor Mitchell has information on the mystery concerning Nick.
| 2 | Episode Two | Sarah Daniels | Paul Murphy | 8 January 2004 |
Tanya and Annie both wear chicken claw jewellery to school. Mr. Green finds discipline a problem at the school. Ian finally manages to find Shannon. It looks like Taylor is stalking Mel.
| 3 | Episode Three | Neil Jones | Jill Robertson | 13 January 2004 |
Togger decides to try find the treasure Uncle Peter told him about during a cross country run.
| 4 | Episode Four | Kay Stonham | Jill Robertson | 15 January 2004 |
Mr. Wainwright ends up disappearing. There is something going on between Andy and Emma. Calvin becomes a Roman statue. Togger decides to try and use Mr. Green's knowledge to work out the location of the time capsule.
| 5 | Episode Five | Matthew Evans | David Andrews | 20 January 2004 |
The school caretaker ruins Togger's hopes of discovering the time capsule. Taylor's account of Nick's racist past becomes known to everyone. Annie is forced to stay at home by her father.
| 6 | Episode Six | Richard Burke | David Andrews | 22 January 2004 |
Things end up coming to a head for the Wainwright family. Togger ends up having some fun with a false door. Taylor goads Nick.
| 7 | Episode Seven | Richard Burke | Chris Corcoran | 27 January 2004 |
Taylor's disappearance is thought to be a permanent exclusion. Annie and Tanya fall out.
| 8 | Episode Eight | Matthew Evans | Chris Corcoran | 29 January 2004 |
Josh wants to take part in the trip to France essay writing competition but after he learns that Anika is also planning on entering he isn't inspired to write anything. Martin ends up entering in Josh's name.
| 9 | Episode Nine | Sarah Daniels | Jill Robertson | 3 February 2004 |
Tanya and Annie renew their friendship. Anika finds out that Josh will be going with her to France. Miss Dyson manages to find an ex-Grange Hill Student for Togger to interview.
| 10 | Episode Ten | Kaddy Benyon | Jill Robertson | 5 February 2004 |
Anika nearly gets pulled off the French Exchange trip. Togger and Abel go to see an elderly man in sheltered accommodation. Nick is convinced by Taylor to go talk to the police.
| 11 | Episode Eleven | Neil Jones | David Andrews | 10 February 2004 |
Togger and Abel end up giving a really bad presentation for the history project. Martin makes some new friends. Annie's mother ends up taking some drastic steps after she is disobedient.
| 12 | Episode Twelve | Kay Stonham | David Andrews | 12 February 2004 |
Shannon remembers her parents on the anniversary their death. Jeremy learns that it is Emma who is leaving presents for Miss Dyson. Baz and Annie end up calling their social worker to deal with their mother.
| 13 | Episode Thirteen | Richard Burke | Chris Corcoran | 17 February 2004 |
Tanya receives another surprise from Togger. Jeremy attempts to help Emma.
| 14 | Episode Fourteen | Richard Burke | Chris Corcoran | 19 February 2004 |
The truth is revealed that Emma is the one who has been leaving presents for Miss Dyson. Mr. Green's patience is tested by Taylor.
| 15 | Episode Fifteen | Matthew Evans | Peter Hoar | 24 February 2004 |
Emma and Annie are involved in a fight and Miss Dyson makes then apologise to one another. Mr. Green ends up hitting Taylor after being goaded by him which Nick sees.
| 16 | Episode Sixteen | Sarah Daniels | Peter Hoar | 26 February 2004 |
Taylor is expelled after Mr. Green gives a false account of what happened and Nick does nothing. Jeremy thinks that Emma should write an email to her mother. Baz forgets that he is supposed to be meeting Maddie.
| 17 | Episode Seventeen | Kay Stonham | Shani Grewal | 2 March 2004 |
Even Emma's winning of the DVD artwork competition fails to make her feel happy. With Kathy and Baz's help, Martin manages to stand up to Max.
| 18 | Episode Eighteen | Kaddy Benyon | Shani Grewal | 4 March 2004 |
Nick ends up puts his neck on the line after telling Mrs. Bassinger that he saw Mr. Green's attacking Taylor. Annie discovers that her dad has decided to stop taking his pills.
| 19 | Episode Nineteen | Neil Jones | Paul Murphy | 9 March 2004 |
Emma, Annie and Tanya all become friends once again. Mr. Malachay offers Ian a holiday job. Taylor ends up deciding that he wants to stay and decides to retract his statement about Mr. Green.
| 20 | Episode Twenty | Neil Jones | David Richardson | 11 March 2004 |
Togger's brother ends up causing mayhem with the help of a goat at the school open day. Shannon ends up making a last moment decision about Ian. The year eight girls handcuff themselves to the playing field goalposts.

== DVD release ==
The twenty-seventh series of Grange Hill has never been released on DVD as of 2014.
