= Grange Hill series 30 =

Grange Hill
- Season 30
- No. of episodes: 20

Release
- Original network: CBBC Channel
- Original release: 16 January – 22 March 2007

Season chronology
- ← Previous; Series 29 Next → Series 31

The thirtieth series of the British television drama series Grange Hill began broadcasting on 16 January 2007, before ending on 22 March 2007 on the CBBC Channel. The series follows the lives of the staff and students of the eponymous school, an inner-city London comprehensive school. It consists of twenty episodes.

== Cast ==
=== Students ===
- Matthew Buckley as Martin Miller
- Sammy O'Grady as Kathy McIlroy
- Tom Hudson as Baz Wainwright
- Holly Quin-Ankrah as Karen Young
- James Wignall as Max Humphries
- Rob Norbury as Donnie Briscoe
- Rebecca-Anne Withey as Holly Parsons
- Amber Hodgkiss as Eleanor Smith
- Lewis Rainer as Ross Duncan
- Jonathan Dixon as Mooey Humphries
- Chris Crookall as Andy Turner
- Max Friswell as Jeremy Bishop
- Lucas Lindo as Abel Benson
- Chris Perry-Metcalf as Togger Johnson
- Kirsten Cassidy as Tanya Young
- Daniella Fray as Emma Bolton
- Danny Miller as Kyle Brown
- Jack McMullen as Tigger Johnson
- Alex Sheldon as Ed Booth
- Holly Mai as Sammy Lee
- Mia Smith as Chloe Moore
- Darcy Isa as Andrea O'Malley
- Josh Brown as Alex Pickering
- Georgia May Foote as Alison Simmons
- Sacha Parkinson as Anna Duncan
- Lucien Laviscount as Jake Briggs
- Daisy McCormick as Lucy Johnson
- Grace Cassidy as Rachel Towers
- Joseph Slack as Bryn Williams
- Naomi Ritchie as Jenny Young
- William Rush as Ali Duncan

=== Teachers ===
- Paul Gilmore as Mr McDonnell
- Cathy Tyson as Miss Gayle
- Reece Noi as Taylor Mitchell
- Kim Hartman as Miss Hilda Rawlinson

=== Others ===
- Cally Lawrence as Mrs McIlroy
- Gillian Perry as Mrs Bolton
- Nigel Betts as Mr Pickering
- Julie Peasgood as Celeb Dance Judge

== Episodes ==
#	Episode	Writer	Director	Original airdate
1	Episode One	Phil Redmond	Nigel Keen	16 January 2007
Kathy comes to school in the learner car and bumps into the gate. Taylor Mitchell, who is now an assistant caretaker, tells Kathy off. Togger is left with the job of taking his younger sister, Lucy, to school. Jenny Young, Karen and Tanya's half sister, is new to Grange Hill. Chloe admits to Andrea her admiration for 6th former, Max Humphries as he is introducing the Year 7's to Grange Hill by paying a fee to cross the playground. Emma avoids everyone, but Tanya soon finds out she has a black eye caused by a fight with her mother. Ed and Tigger jump on Alex's back and Alex's batch of smoothies end up spilt. Lucy is pushed in a corridor and a feud between the Young and Johnson family starts.
2	Episode Two	Neil Jones	Nigel Keen	18 January 2007
Tigger makes fun of a guard dog outside the travellers site. The dog chases Tigger and Alex, run in front of Kathy's car and she does an emergency stop. The dog ends up in the playground, but a boy makes the dog go home, much to Emma's fascination. The boy, named Kyle, is placed in Emma's form. Holly decides to organise an 18th birthday party for Baz. When Chloe finds out, she is determined to get an invite because Max will be there. Tanya has a friend named Luke, who intrigues her friend Emma after Tanya confirms she is 16 on the phone. Jeremy puts a request out for the radio, as though from Togger, declaring his love for Tanya and arranging a meeting. When it goes out, Tanya listens and is shocked, but Togger has earplugs in so misses it. Karen starts up lunchtime free-dance classes, but finds it hard to get participants. Emma arrives at the travellers' camp, and learns the truth - Kyle's home is in amongst the caravans
3	Episode Three	Heather Robson		23 January 2007
Ed and Tigger agree to help Alex with his business if they agree to cut them in on the deal. Emma gets closer to Kyle. Chloe sends some love text messages to Max. Holly is jealous of Baz's friendship with Anna.
4	Episode Four	Andy Lynch	Craig Lines	25 January 2007
Kyle ends up putting a gypsy curse on Chloe. Mooey tells Alex to sell smoothies on credit. Togger learns that Andy is leaving to go to a private school.
5	Episode Five	Sarah Daniels	Daikin Marsh	30 January 2007
After seeing Baz dancing with Anna, Togger ends up playing a rough game of football and Baz does not get up after being knocked to the ground.
6	Episode Six	Heather Robson	Daikin Marsh	1 February 2007
Tanya spends the day walking with Togger as everyone is left reeling following Baz's death. Donnie thinks that Togger is to blame for Baz's death.
7	Episode Seven	Sarah Daniels	Gill Wilkinson	6 February 2007
Togger is forced to face his problems. Chloe decides that she can profit from Baz's death. Kathy takes her Driving Theory Test. It is revealed that Baz died because he had a problem with his heart.
8	Episode Eight	Neil Jones	Gill Wilkinson	8 February 2007
Kathy gets drunk on the day of Baz's funeral and shocks everybody by what she has to say. Alex decides to get rid of his business.
9	Episode Nine	Andy Lynch	Tris Burns	13 February 2007
Emma uses of a home pregnancy test kit. Ed and Tigger perform an impressive magic trick on the radio. Tanya is shocked at the hairdressers. Holly decides to go to Australia.
10	Episode Ten	David Hanson	Tris Burns	15 February 2007
The year seven Student are bullied by Alex. Chloe discovers a way to get Max's attention. Tanya learns from Emma about her pregnancy. Emma and Tanya learn that the travellers have moved on.
11	Episode Eleven	Neil Jones	Nigel Keen	20 February 2007
Kathy gets drunk as she celebrates her birthday. Tigger uses Lucy's guinea pig in a magic trick but manages to lose it in the process. Chloe's kiss from Max is not quite how she imagined it would be.
12	Episode Twelve	David Hanson	Nigel Keen	22 February 2007
Tigger and Ed still are unable to locate the missing guinea pig. A raffle prize is stolen by Alex for Mooey.
13	Episode Thirteen	Andy Lynch	Craig Lines	27 February 2007
Jenny manages to spoil Tigger and Ed's magic tricks. Alex relays the aggression from Max and Mooey onto Bryn. Tanya ends up informing Togger about Emma's pregnancy.
14	Episode Fourteen	Sarah Daniels	Craig Lines	1 March 2007
Kathy manages to pass her driving test. News of Emma's pregnancy spreads. Tanya calls Emma's mother and Emma is not happy.
15	Episode Fifteen	Heather Robson	Tris Burns	6 March 2007
Tigger, Ed, Alison and Sammy take part in some ghost hunting. Kathy ends up going out partying once again and ends up being unable to remember if she slept with Donnie or not.
16	Episode Sixteen	Sarah Daniels	Tris Burns	8 March 2007
Chloe takes a strange picture of Max to get revenge against him. Kathy's mother learns about Donnie Max and Mooey want Alex to find a fridge-freezer for them.
17	Episode Seventeen	Andy Lynch	Mark Sendell	13 March 2007
Alex and Bryn's acquisition of a fridge ends up contributing towards the schools football efforts. Max learns that it was Chloe who took the photograph of him. Plans are made by Tanya to celebrate her birthday.
18	Episode Eighteen	Neil Jones	Marc Sendell	15 March 2007
Alex's bullying is revealed which leads to a fight that unites Togger and Donnie. Emma pays a visit to an abortion clinic.
19	Episode Nineteen	Heather Robson	Nigel Keen	20 March 2007
Max ends up ruining Karen's chances of winning the dance competition and spikes Martin's drink. Togger has an overseas holiday job lined up which upsets Tanya. Tanya and Togger end up sharing their first ever kiss.
20	Episode Twenty	David Hanson	Nigel Keen	22 March 2007
Everybody prepares to go to the school prom. Togger is surprised by Donnie. Emma reveals that she didn't go ahead with the abortion.

== DVD release ==
The thirtieth series of Grange Hill has never been released on DVD as of 2023.
