= Grange Hill series 31 =

Season of television series

Grange Hill
- Season 31
- No. of episodes: 20

Release
- Original network: BBC One
- Original release: 14 April – 15 September 2008

Season chronology
- ← Previous; Series 30

The thirty-first and final series of the British television drama series Grange Hill began broadcasting on 14 April 2008, before ending on 15 September 2008 on BBC One. The series follows the lives of the staff and students of the eponymous school, an inner-city London comprehensive school. It consists of twenty episodes, and was shown one episode per week for the first time in the show's history.

== Cast ==
=== Students ===
- Lucas Lindo as Abel Benson
- Chris Perry-Metcalf as Togger Johnson
- Kirsten Cassidy as Tanya Young
- Jack McMullen as Tigger Johnson
- Alex Sheldon as Ed Booth
- Holly Mai as Sammy Lee
- Mia Smith as Chloe Moore
- Darcy Isa as Andrea O'Malley
- Josh Brown as Alex Pickering
- Georgia May Foote as Alison Simmons
- Lucien Laviscount as Jake Briggs
- Daisy McCormick as Lucy Johnson
- Grace Cassidy as Rachel Towers
- Joseph Slack as Bryn Williams
- Naomi Ritchie as Jenny Young
- Michael Coventry as Ducket
- Tom Stott as Laxo Archer
- Dequaine Brown as Theo Benson
- Sam Lewis as Clooney
- Jonathan Beilby as Gyngell
- Nathan Tunnah as XS Smith
- Sofia Filipe as Serena Sulli
- Wenona Armstrong-Lowe as Megan Williams

=== Teachers ===
- Paul Gilmore as Mr McDonnell
- Kim Hartman as Miss Hilda Rawlinson
- Kate Deakin as Miss Bettany
- Sammy O'Grady as Kathy McIlroy

=== Others ===
- Joe Houghton as Boarderman
- Chris Hall as Duane Miller
- Richard Standing as PC McGuffin
- Chloe Summerskill as News Reporter
- Adele Parry as Ms Archer
- John Jardine as Frank Hooper
- Kenneth Alan Taylor as Mayor
- James Sarsfield as Photographer
- Danny McCall as Mr Johnson
- Vicky Gates as Tour Guide
- Dave Bryan, Mike McCullan, Takura Tendayi & Sholto Websdale as Crew 82
- Poppy Rush as Olive Oliver Olliver
- Kerry McGregor as Mrs Moore
- Alexandra Pearson as Patsy Clarke
- Tui McLean as Cecile
- Todd Carty as Peter "Tucker" Jenkins

== Episodes ==
#	Episode	Writer	Director	Original airdate
1	New Beginnings	Phil Redmond	Trish Burns	14 April 2008
A new term has begun, and Lucy decides to take her dog into school, and it's Togger who will feel the wrath of Mr McDonnell, newly appointed deputy head, if the dog runs riot around Grange Hill. Meanwhile, Tanya finds herself at the centre of attention of three Year 7 boys.
2	Boarderman	Neil Jones	Tracey Rooney	21 April 2008
When Mr McDonnell bans skateboards, Boarderman, Grange Hill's very own superhero, is born. however, not all the kids are happy about the new craze, and a plot gets underway to flush Boarderman out.
3	Election Day	Neil Jones	Tim Hopewell	28 April 2008
Lucy and Jenny come to blows as they act as campaigners for Togger and Tanya in the school head boy/girl election. Lucy, alarmed at the prospects of her brother becoming head boy, begins campaigning against Togger, and tries to frame Jenny.
4	The Double Cross Country	David Hanson	Trish Burns	12 May 2008
Chloe comes to school with a faked bad leg to try to get out of the cross country run, but Kathy has been watching the CCTV. The forgotten-my-kit ploy doesn't work either: she and Andrea have to wear a lost property mish-mash. When they decide to hide inside a shed, Cloe and Andrea endure on a series of mishaps that leaves them stranded, miles away from Grange Hill. Meanwhile, Ed and Tigger decide to stick with Alex, and make a go-slow protest run.
5	Food Fight	David Hanson	Tracey Rooney	19 May 2008
The CLC is to be formally opened by footballer star – turned chef – Dwayne Miller, once a student at the school. Many of the Year 8's don't like the celebrity who has sold out to a Spanish team and advocates unpalatable food like kelp – they plan an egg-throwing demo. Chloe intends to video Dwayne losing his temper and sell it to the media.
6	The Thing About Mates	Heather Robson	Tim Hopewell	2 June 2008
Sammy Lee is the only one who remembered Alison's birthday. Alex determinedly bakes a cake for her, while Tigger makes a special video on his phone for her. however, when he catches Alison and Ed kissing, news of their relationship spreads around the school, leaving Alison and Ed friendless. Meanwhile, Chloe decides she can work just as well alone – Andrea must prove herself if she wants to save their friendship.
7	Buddy Hell	David Hanson	AdrianBean	9 June 2008
A buddy scheme is launched as the Year 6's start to make use of the facilities. Alex is on a mission to build a shy girl's confidence. However, the scheme is threatened by Chloe when she targets Bryn's little sister Megan, and turns everyone against Alex.
8	You're Nicked	David Hanson	Tim Hopewell	16 June 2008
A performance artist is due to come to school. A pensioner, Frank Hooper, arrives with some enthusiasm to use the computer facilities of the CLC: Alison and Sammy are convinced he is the artiste and start drawing him. The true performer, Mr. McGuffin, makes himself known to Mr. McDonnell – he is dressed as a policeman and sets up a mystery for the Year 7's to solve, aided by Tigger and Ed. Unfortunately, the boys have real life problems – their mobile phones are stolen from their bags. Tigger's immediate thought is to blame Chloe, who in turn has seen the fake policeman and is concerned her many crimes have been found out.
9	Extra Terrestri-Hill	Neil Jones	Adrian Bean	23 June 2008
Bryn is convinced the strange happenings at Grange Hill are the cause of aliens. his friends are amused by this – except a skeptical Rachel, and the unlikely pair unite to prove they are telling the truth, putting Grange Hill in the spotlight with the local press.
10	Schmutts	Heather Robson	Gill Wilkinson	30 June 2008
When a pedigree dog show is announced, Lucy and Jenny decide they'll make an alternative competition to see who owns the most badly behaved mutt. Jake is dismayed to hear that Jenny doesn't love her dog, Rory, any more – she wants to return it to the dogs home. The official dog show (organised by Laxo's aunt) gets underway. Chloe and Andrea see money-making opportunities and rattle a charity tin under people's noses, but they would do better with a dog with them. Andrea returns with the posh mutt, Chiquitita, that belongs to Laxo's aunt, but it goes missing...
11	Building Bridges	Martin Riley	Tim Hopewell	7 July 2008
a team-building exercise is under way to demonstrate the power of teamwork. The teams of four have to follow a series of clues and build a bridge with the parts they find. The ineffectual Miss Bettany is shocked to realize she's messed up with the clues, and both red and yellow teams are racing for the same location. Meanwhile, Alex is struggling with the pressure of exams: Sammy introduces him to Tai Chi.
12	Veggin Out	Jessica Lea	Eddy Marshall	14 July 2008
Tigger is infatuated with Kathy, and happily agrees to help with an after-school task of showing round the mayor. When Lucy finds her dad is working for the local petting farm, delivering animals to the abattoir, she turns vegetarian – Jenny is skeptical that she'll keep it up for long. Lucy persuades the others to go with her to the farm to make a protest, but instead they bring back animals to the CLC, and worse still, Cloe has rumbled them. Will she jepordise the reputation of Grange Hill by exposing them?
13	The Competition	Neil Jones	Gill Wilkinson	21 July 2008
Jenny enters the inter-school music competition and the prize is a trip to Liverpool and money for instruments. She is surprised when Jake appears with his own violin. Bryn and Ducket's piece is a comedy act. Two year 6's, Megan and Serena fall out over trying to impress Tanya, the head girl. Jenny refuses to do her act with Jake, and it's Bryn and Ducket who win to represent the school.Bryn and Ducket decide to join with Jenny and Jake and they secure the prize. Tanya and Miss Green get Serena and Megan to stick up for each other, and they become friends again. Outside, the four musicians hold the giant cheque.
14	Gift Rapped	David Hanson	Tim Hopewell	28 July 2008
Togger is overheard talking on his mobile about "Tanya being ready" and Lucy believes he is going to propose to Tanya. The school trip to Liverpool seems an ideal opportunity for Tigger to see Crew 82's secret gig. However, they are banned from going and hide in the toilet but Chloe spots them in there and gets money out of them to keep quiet. Tigger is lost from the fake messages but then a proper text message clue arrives - the gig is at the famous Cavern at 3pm. Lucy sees Togger kneels down in front of Tanya and thinks he is proposing to her!
15	Who Are You?	David Hanson	Eddy Marshall	4 August 2008
Twenty words to describe your family is the task set for Grange Hill. Year 10's, are auctioned off as slaves. Clooney and Gyngel put a bid in for smug Chloe and Andrea who never would believe anyone would dare try to enslave them. Gyngel gets Andrea to wear "Spock" ears and is slowly won over to the cause of Star Trek, while Chloe keeps Clooney's amorous advances firmly at bay. Frank Hooper turns up and Frank explains to Kathy that he's Rachel's grandfather. Rachel tells Lucy and Bryn that her mother has made her grandfather persona non grata. Frank explains he long ago had an affair with his wife's sister and there was a child that Rachel does not know about, a lost aunt in Los Angeles. Through Miss Green's intervention, Rachel talks to her grandfather, and sees through the web-cam her new cousin in America, a baby called Grace. Rachel agrees to talk to her mother and to show her a picture of Grace.
16	Grapple	Neil Jones	Tim Hopewell	11 August 2008
While Alex and Ed seem set for a wrestling grapple over Sammy, Andrea's aptitude for spelling puts her in the team for the Inter School Spelling Grapple. Chloe is mean about it and tells Andrea to spell pneumonoultramicroscopicsilicovolcanoconiosis if she's so clever. Andrea meets the spelling champion, Olive Olliver, who silently spells out "Drop Dead Loser" with her Alphabeti Spaghetti. The web-stream is replaced by feed from the spelling contest, and Chloe finds herself drawn in, rooting for Andrea. All the competition is beaten, leaving just Andrea and Olive: Olive fails to spell continuum - Andrea's word is pneumonoultramicroscopicsilicovolcanoconiosis and she wins. Alex is about to ask Sammy out to the end of term prom when XS appears in a wrestling outfit, jumping on him. Alex leaves in an ambulance - to his horror he sees Ed with his arm around Sammy. Andrea triumphantly shows Chloe the Spelling Grapple cup - Chloe observes that they spelt her name wrong
17	Where There's Justice?	Heather Robson	Eddy Marshall	18 August 2008
Theo and Laxo decide to be mute for the day but still play pranks on everyone. When Chloe makes fun of Serena's dyslexia, her mentor Alex decides that they'll hold a "bullies court".Chloe refuses to apologize despite the threat of expulsion. Still she refuses, even though everyone present tries to appeal to her sense of fair-play, bringing up her name-calling, stealing and bullying of those younger. Finally Andrea pipes up that Chloe's mum is in a wheelchair but Chloe walks away. Serena feels let down by Alex's failure, but one-armed Miss Green confronts Chloe taunting her into the usual type of joke made against her disability, not allowing her to leave. She makes the point about how it feels to be singled out, and finally Chloe does apologize. Chloe goes home to her mother and is annoyed with Andrea. She blows out the candle on her cake and the doorbell rings - it's Andrea with a present for her and reluctantly Chloe accepts the gift from her friend.
18	Virtual Reality	Martin Riley	Gill Wilkinson	1 September 2008
When Jake and the other Year 8's get embroiled in virtual reality historical computer simulations, Jenny falls out with Jake and makes a new friend of Patsy Clark. Patsy's home life, an anorexic sister in America, her father working in espionage, all seem a little unbelievable to Lucy. Other Year 7's support Patsy, and the issue evolves into a dispute between Year 7 and Year 8's.Alex is involved with a "second life" type game without realizing he is chatting to Patsy who is on another terminal. Alison and Sammy make their own avatar and use a magazine to create a persona to talk to him with. Then they realize the magazine contains Patsy's fictional life story. The big Civil War battle starts in the CLC, manifesting itself as a Year 7 vs Year 8 struggle. Alex, Alison and Sammy restore the peace by showing that Patsy's home life was taken from the magazine. On their own, Jenny tells off Patsy for making so much trouble, but softens when Patsy tells her that her father is in prison
19	Zut Alors!	David Hanson	Gill Wilkinson	8 September 2008
French student Cecile gives Tigger a new look, but a collision with a netball post gives him a weird nightmare where all his friends have colourful, and scary personae.
20	Bang	Neil Jones	Eddy Marshall	15 September 2008
On the last day of school, Togger reminisces with Abel and Tanya about the old days: they recall their treasure hunt in the sewer tunnel – nearby, the Year 7's overhear and decide to explore themselves. Togger's on the verge of quitting, so Tanya calls in his uncle – ex student Tucker Jenkins, to persuade him to stay for his final year. Meanwhile, everyone is in danger when a bomb is discovered underneath the school. Guest appearance: Tucker Jenkins As this is the final episode of the series, this marks the final appearance of all characters featured herein. Most notable in this instance is Tucker Jenkins, having featured in the first to fifth series of the show, as well as a guest appearance in the twenty-sixth series.

== DVD release ==
The thirty-first and final series of Grange Hill has yet to be released on DVD.
