= Cheryl Gray =

Cheryl Gray may refer to:

- Cheryl A. Gray Evans (born 1968), American politician in the Louisiana Senate
- Cheryl Gray (Coronation Street), a character from the British soap opera Coronation Street
- Samantha Sang (born 1951), Australian singer who had an earlier career as Cheryl Gray
