= The Spell (2009 film) =

2009 British horror film

- Directed by: Owen Carey Jones
- Written by: Owen Carey Jones
- Starring: Rebecca Pitkin, Luke Harris, Amber Hodgkiss
- Cinematography: Stephen J. Nelson
- Edited by: Owen Carey Jones
- Music by: Alan Moore
- Production company: Carey Films
- Distributed by: Kaleidoscope Home Entertainment, Showbox Media Group
- Release date: 18 September 2009 (UK)
- Running time: 94 minutes
- Country: United Kingdom
- Language: English

The Spell is a 2009 British horror film directed by Owen Carey Jones. It was first released in the United Kingdom on 18 September 2009 and stars Rebecca Pitkin as a young woman that begins to dabble in witchcraft but soon gets in over her head. The film is loosely based on the true story of Emma Whale, who contacted Carey Jones with the intent to turn her experience into a film. The Spell was shot entirely in Leeds.

== Plot summary ==
A former drug user, Jenny (Rebecca Pitkin) finds herself constantly struggling to find acceptance and love from her divorced parents, neither of whom truly want her around. Her mother's boyfriend even goes so far as to use Jenny's room as storage, which makes Jenny have to live in the basement after her father sends her back to her mother's house. Jenny tries to become more independent by getting a job and moving in with her boyfriend Rick (Luke Harris). This arrangement is short lived, as the two end up breaking up over Kate (Laura O'Donoughue), a young girl that is obsessed with Rick. As a result Jenny is pushed further into the arms of Ed, a co-worker that she had become extremely close to. However what the viewer soon learns is that Ed and Kate are both individually involved in the occult and that Kate has cast several spells with the intent to harm others. Eventually Kate manages to convince Rick to assist her in casting a spell that would make Jenny's life miserable.

== Cast ==
- Rebecca Pitkin as Jenny
- Luke Harris as Rick (as Pietro Herrera)
- Amber Hodgkiss as Vicky
- Julia Curle as Clare
- Laura O'Donoughue as Kate
- Steve Murphy as Jenny's Dad
- Steve Smith as Ed
- Luke Dickson as Psychiatrist
- Kristy Bruce as Laura
- Thomas Frere as Priest
- Deborah Brian as Jenny's Mum
- Ian Targett as City Centre Priest
- Paul Hurstfield as Ian
- Lou Birks as High Priestess
- Claire Ferdinando as Sandra

== Reception ==
Critical reception for The Spell has been overwhelmingly negative and the film holds a rating of 0% on Rotten Tomatoes, based on 9 reviews. The Guardian criticized the film as "bewilderingly awful" and noted that the movie had "characters whose lips don't quite move in sync with the audio track." The Screen Daily also panned the film, remarking that "The intention behind The Spell may have been to ground this young woman’s nightmare in a mundane sense of everyday life but the result is a film that feels underwhelming throughout." In contrast, HorrorNews.net gave a more positive review and commented that the movie would have little appeal to gore hounds, but that fans of atmospheric films would likely enjoy it.
