= Like Father =

2018 film project directed by Lauren Miller

- Film release poster
- Directed by: Lauren Miller
- Screenplay by: Lauren Miller
- Story by: Anders Bard; Lauren Miller
- Produced by: Anders Bard; Amanda Bowers; Molly Conners; Lauren Miller
- Starring: Kristen Bell; Kelsey Grammer; Seth Rogen
- Cinematography: Seamus Tierney
- Edited by: Mollie Goldstein
- Music by: Roger Neill
- Production company: aBard Production
- Distributed by: Netflix
- Release date: August 3, 2018 (United States)
- Running time: 98 minutes
- Country: United States
- Language: English

Like Father is a 2018 American dramedy film written and directed by Lauren Miller, in her feature-length directorial debut. The film stars Kristen Bell, Kelsey Grammer, and Seth Rogen.

The plot follows a woman who finally bonds with her estranged father on what was supposed to be her honeymoon cruise after she is left at the altar.

The film was released on August 3, 2018, by Netflix.

== Plot ==
Rachel is a young, workaholic executive New Yorker who takes a work call right before going down the aisle. The processional music starts, she finally hangs up, stashing the phone in her bouquet and starts the walk.

The officiant is her boss, who shares some personal details about the groom, and then turns to Rachel. When her phone drops out of the bouquet, the groom realizes she will not ever really get away from her job and calls off the wedding.

Then her estranged father Harry, whom Rachel has not seen since she was five years old, is at the wedding and sees it all. He races out and she is not far behind.

The next day Rachel tries, and fails, to be a professional back in the office. Sent home, she soon binge drinks alone, then Harry catches up with her and they resume in a bar. Spending all night drinking, they make the drunken decision to take the pre-booked Caribbean honeymoon cruise together. The morning after, out at sea, the trip seems somewhat less amusing.

The pair arrive as strangers, but over the course of a few adventures, a couple of umbrella-clad cocktails and much soul-searching, they return with a renewed appreciation for family and life.

Harry is a deadbeat dad and the trip is his road to redemption. Like Rachel, he had been a workaholic but, through being there for his business partner as family, he sacrifices his company to care for him.

A glimpse is seen of Rachel's big client, a couple of former New Yorkers, hippies who decided to become organic potato chip makers, now living upstate. An example of people who abandoned the rat race for a more fulfilling life.

Harry and Rachel bond with the three couples assigned to their dinner table on the cruise: one young, one 50-year-anniversary, and one mid-life newlyweds. On a hike with the group, a breaking point comes when Rachel insists on being on her phone at a gorgeous secluded waterfall. Throwing it into the water, Harry begins to wake her up to the fact that she is missing out on life.

After receiving a call from a collection service at her work, Rachel learns Harry is bankrupt. Thinking he came to her for money, she unloads on him only to find out Harry's business partner Gabe died and left him feeling lonely and regretting his life decisions. He tells her he's got the bankruptcy handled and came looking to repair his relationship with her and will be moving to Los Angeles after settling his debts. At the end of the cruise, their relationship is much improved and Rachel promises to help him move.

At first, after the cruise Rachel dives head first into a new role in her advertising company, forgetting any lessons she may have learned. Her breakthrough comes at the very end. She reroutes a trip to meet with their big upstate client for L.A. to help her dad move as promised.

== Cast ==
- Kristen Bell as Rachel Hamilton
- Kelsey Grammer as Harry Hamilton, Rachel's father
- Seth Rogen as Jeff
- Paul W. Downs as Jim
- Zach Appelman as Steve
- Amber Hodgkiss as Ginny
- Leonard Ouzts as Dan
- Blaire Brooks as Beth
- Anthony Laciura as Leonard
- Mary Looram as Shirley
- Brett Gelman as Frank Lerue
- Lauren Miller as Tired Woman
- Jon Foster as Owen
- Kimiko Glenn as Geena

== Production ==
In July 2017, it was announced that Kristen Bell and Kelsey Grammer would star in Like Father, the directorial debut of Lauren Miller, who also wrote the screenplay. In June 2018, a trailer for the film was released, which revealed that Seth Rogen would co-star. Lauren Miller produced the film with Anders Bard.

Principal photography took place in New York and the Caribbean in August 2017. Some of the film was filmed on Royal Caribbean’s Harmony of the Seas.

== Release ==
Like Father was released on Netflix on August 3, 2018.

=== Critical response ===
The film received mixed reviews from critics. On the review aggregation website Rotten Tomatoes, the film holds an approval rating of 46% based on 41 reviews, with an average rating of 5.2/10. The site consensus reads, "Like Father unites an alarmingly talented cast for a predictable rom-com that does nothing to counter the negative stereotypes surrounding the genre." On Metacritic, the film has a weighted average score of 52 out of 100, based on reviews from 15 critics, indicating "mixed or average" reviews.
