= Cheryl Gray (Coronation Street) =

Fictional character in British soap opera

- Coronation Street character
- Portrayed by: Holly Quin-Ankrah
- Duration: 2010–2011
- First appearance: 9 April 2010
- Last appearance: 18 November 2011
- Introduced by: Kim Crowther
In-universe information
- Occupation: Lapdancer; Takeaway assistant Barmaid; Taxicab controller Bar manager
- Husband: Chris Gray (until 2011)
- Sons: Russ Gray

Cheryl Gray is a fictional character from the British ITV soap opera Coronation Street, played by Holly Quin-Ankrah. She debuted on-screen during the episode airing 9 April 2010. Originally introduced as a love interest for an existing character, Cheryl has been involved in storylines involving lapdancing and domestic abuse since her inception. Cheryl's age was tweaked to accommodate the much younger Quin-Ankrah's real age. In May 2011, it was announced the producers had decided not to renew Quin-Ankrah's contract. She departed on-screen on 18 November 2011.

Cheryl has been described as having "positive, caring, family oriented" personality traits. Cheryl's storyline has mainly focused around her relationships with Lloyd Mullaney (Craig Charles) and Chris Gray (Will Thorp). Quin-Ankrah has stated that throughout Cheryl's duration she has been "caught in the middle" of Chris and Lloyd's fights. In 2010, Quin-Ankrah was nominated for an Inside Soap Award for her portrayal of Cheryl.

== Creation and casting ==
In February 2010, it was announced that a new character, Cheryl, would be introduced to Coronation Street as the love interest of established character Lloyd Mullaney. Of Cheryl's introduction, Coronation Street series editor Louise Sutton said: "[Lloyd] soon learns she's a lapdancer but, far from being put off, he falls head over heels in love with her as he becomes her regular taxi driver. However, she tries to keep him at arm's length and when we learn more about her troubled personal life, we realise Lloyd's putting his heart and his safety on the line for the woman he loves." Cheryl was given an immediate link to Leanne Battersby (Jane Danson) who is an old friend. Former Rock Rivals actress Holly Quin-Ankrah was cast in the role of Cheryl. Of her casting, Quin-Ankrah stated: "I'm really happy to be joining Coronation Street. It feels great and it's been really exciting seeing the set and meeting the cast. It's pretty scary too when you're sat in The Rovers filming a scene with Ken (William Roache) and Deirdre [Barlow] (Anne Kirkbride) sat next to you!" Former Footballers Wives actress Phina Oruche told the Liverpool Echo that she unsuccessfully auditioned for the role of Cheryl, after Coronation Street producers asked her to do a screen test with Charles. Twenty-two-year-old Quin-Ankrah did not reveal her age at the time of the casting process and dressed in clothes that made her look older. Cheryl was originally aged thirty, however this was changed to twenty-nine.

== Development ==
While interview by itv.com, Quin-Ankrah described Cheryl as being a "positive, caring, family oriented, passionate, previous stripping, cocktail making, happy, positive and lovable" character. Quin-Ankrah has spoken positively of her character's lap dancing occupation, stating: "I know girls who do it as a job and that's great but I've never fancied it myself. If you're body conscious it's not the best thing to do – and I am." Quin-Ankrah admitted that she couldn't do the profession herself but added that she would never judge anyone who does it for a living. She also stated other positives as the health benefits and it helps tone the body.

In May 2010, it was announced that former Casualty actor Will Thorp had been cast as Cheryl's 'bad boy' husband Chris. Digital Spy reported: "It emerges that Chris and Cheryl share a son, Russ (Finton Flynn). However, things take a turn for the worse when Chris meets Cheryl's current boyfriend Lloyd." It was then revealed that Cheryl had been abused by Chris.

Speaking of how the storyline progresses Quin-Ankrah stated: "There are so many twists and turns it's exciting for me even to read the script, but it won't be as straightforward as people would imagine. There are relationship woes coming up with Chris who she's with now and turbulent times ahead. It's certainly worth watching." Co-star Charles also praised the storyline describing it as a challenge. Quin-Ankrah later admitted she was initially nervous about the storyline because she wanted to portray it with justice of the issue. She further spoke about how the plot helps educate stating: "That was interesting because, getting the scripts, you start to understand why women do that, in a way. You always think, 'If I was in that position I'd leave him', but when you're reading a script, you are inside Cheryl's head." On a separate occasion she spoke of how women like Cheryl in real life find it hard to leave their abuser because of the love they once had for the person, she also added that she hoped never to be in the same situation. Quin-Ankrah said the main reason Cheryl stopped loving Chris was because he hit her. Chris' arrival made everything complicated for Cheryl, she was stuck in the middle of his fights with Lloyd. However, they all end up playing "happy families" for Russ' sake.

In May 2011 it was revealed that Cheryl would depart the serial, after producers chose not to renew her contract. The character's on-screen family are also set to depart. Of her departure, Quin-Ankrah said that she had been happy working on the programme and branded it an "amazing experience". In June 2011, it was revealed that Chris would develop a brain tumour. When Cheryl finds out about Chris' illness, she invites him to live with her and Lloyd. As the storylines progresses, Cheryl and Chris become close again. Charles said that Lloyd is stuck in the middle because "he can't be seen to be this horrible man". Lloyd adjusts to the arrangement because he wants "Cheryl to love and respect him". While Thorp said "she's just by his side and kind of being his best friend. And Chris, out of everyone, is very happy for Cheryl to take that place in his life." Quin-Ankrah said that the storyline was a great opportunity for herself and Thorp to show viewers different sides of their on-screen counterparts.

Quin-Ankrah said that there is a "dramatic and exciting" fire that Cheryl will be involved in. However she said it would not be predictable. She also confirmed Cheryl survives, giving her the option of returning in the future. A Coronation Street spokesperson said that "there's no doubt" Chris has been lying about the severity of the tumour because "he wants his wife and child back". Adding that "the fire will be a game changer for all of them." Production remained secretive as to whether any of Cheryl's family would die in the fire. Cheryl departed on-screen on 18 November 2011.

== Storylines ==
Cheryl first appears in April 2010, when she meets up with Leanne. Cheryl tells Leanne she is impressed with her for getting a respectable job. Cheryl flirts with Lloyd and gets attention from Ciaran McCarthy (Keith Duffy). Lloyd drives Cheryl to work and she leaves her mobile in his taxi. Cheryl is shocked when Lloyd comes to the lapdancing club and returns her phone.

Cheryl gradually becomes good friends with Lloyd. He tries to kiss her, but Cheryl refuses and leaves. Cheryl admits to Lloyd that she is married with a son. Lloyd sees Cheryl with a bruise on her face and punches her boss thinking he is responsible. Her boss sacks her because of Lloyd's outburst. Cheryl explains to Lloyd that Chris is violent towards her, and that she wants to leave him. As they leave, Chris sees and tries to stop them. Cheryl and Russ move in with Lloyd. Later, she grows closer to him and they sleep together, but afterwards Cheryl tells him it was a mistake. Cheryl is given a job in Prima Doner by Sunita Alahan (Shobna Gulati). Cheryl is horrified when Chris starts working at Underworld and he agrees to quit in order to help their relationship.

Cheryl argues with Leanne when Simon Barlow (Alex Bain) hits Russ, and insists that Russ isn't bullying him at school. Leanne apologises to Cheryl. She tells Leanne she was wrong and forgives her. Leanne later offers Cheryl a job at The Joinery bar which she is opening with Nick Tilsley (Ben Price). On 6 December 2010 Cheryl is working when the Joinery explodes, destroying the viaduct above and sending a tram crashing onto the street. She is later rescued and brought out of the wreckage alive and is reunited with Russ.

When the Joinery re-opens as a Bistro, Cheryl continues to work there. Nick realises he needs a manager so Cheryl applies for the position and eventually gets it after the selected candidate drops out. Cheryl and Lloyd's offer to purchase No. 13 Coronation Street proceeds. She redecorates the property and moves in. Cheryl finds out that Chris has been diagnosed with a brain tumour and decides to support him. Lloyd thinks Cheryl is having an affair with him and confronts her. When she tells him the truth, she suggests that Chris moves in with them while he fights his illness. Lloyd agrees but feels increasingly pushed out.

Over time, Chris is determined to win Cheryl back again and gradually she begins to fall for him, despite him secretly knowing that his treatment for the tumour has been a success. In October 2011, the pair kiss and subsequently sleep together while Lloyd is away at work. Cheryl is guilt-ridden because of her infidelity but admits to Chris that she has fallen in love with him once again. In November 2011, Lloyd begins to suspect that Chris is lying about his illness; as Cheryl walks in on the confrontation, Chris announces that he and Cheryl are back together, leaving Lloyd devastated and furious at both Cheryl and Chris for taking advantage of him.

On 18 November 2011, Cheryl goes back into number 13 with Chris to move her belongings; Lloyd walks in and angrily accuses her of robbing him, before dragging the sofa out onto the Street and setting it alight. Lloyd punches Chris, who crashes his head on the kerb. At the hospital, Cheryl questions whether his tumour has been affected by this, only to be informed that the tumour had receded weeks ago and Chris was lying. A distraught Cheryl tells Lloyd about Chris' lies, tearfully asking him to forgive her, Lloyd makes it clear that their relationship is beyond repair now. Having lost both men in her life, Cheryl tells Leanne that she and Russ are leaving Weatherfield for good and departs in a taxi after another confrontation with Chris and telling Lloyd that leaving him was something she'll regret forever.

== Reception ==
In July 2010, Quin-Ankrah received a nomination in the "Best Newcomer" category at the 2010 Inside Soap Awards for her portrayal of Cheryl. Jim Shelley of the Daily Mirror said that the serial had a lot of "dead wood" characters such as Cheryl and branded her "deadly boring". A writer for the website of television programme This Morning, said that Cheryl's life "seemed to be going well once she shacked up with kind-hearted cabbie Lloyd." They described her as "silly" for letting her feelings for Chris re-surface.
