= Rock Rivals =

2008 British TV drama series

- Created by: Maureen Chadwick; Ann McManus
- Starring: Michelle Collins; Sean Gallagher; Alison Newman; Holly Quin-Ankrah; Gary Cooke; Helen Modern; Sammy Glenn; Sol Heras; Lisa Dwan
- Country of origin: United Kingdom
- No. of series: 1
- No. of episodes: 8

Production
- Producers: Shed Productions; Element Pictures
- Running time: 60 minutes

Original release
- Network: ITV
- Release: 5 March – 23 April 2008

Rock Rivals is a British television drama series following the lives of two celebrity judges on an X Factor style show as their marriage falls apart. It was produced by Shed Productions, the company behind Footballers' Wives, Bad Girls and Waterloo Road. The series began on 5 March 2008 on ITV and finished on 23 April 2008. It was not renewed, due to both poor ratings and reviews.

== Production ==
The eight-part series was filmed from summer to autumn 2007, and delivered to ITV in spring 2008.

On 2 July 2007 it was announced that former EastEnders actress Michelle Collins and former Coronation Street actor Sean Gallagher had both been cast for the lead roles of characters Karina Faith (née Lewis) (Collins) and her husband Mal (Gallagher). Two days later, in an appearance on the chat show Loose Women, Collins said that it would be filmed over a four-month schedule, and would probably air in January or February 2008.

Rock Rivals finally wrapped on Stage B of Ardmore Studios in Bray, Ireland, on Friday 16 November. Two alternative endings were filmed for the final episode. The viewing public were to be given the chance to vote for their favourite finalist, and the appropriate version was to be aired.

The show also starred Siva Kaneswaran, who would later become a member of The Wanted.

== Cast ==
| Character | Actor |
| Karina Faith | Michelle Collins |
| Mal Faith | Sean Gallagher |
| Dana Bigglesworth | Sammy Glenn |
| Caleb Coombs | Kumar Kaneswaran |
| Carson Coombs | Siva Kaneswaran |
| Darren | James Carlton |
| Luke Ellis | Sol Heras |
| Ocean Faith | Alice Henley |
| Vernon Fentor | Gary Cooke |
| Sundae Gorgeous | Nicola Hughes |
| Bethany Hopkins | Holly Quin-Ankrah |
| Lynette Hopkins | Alison Newman |
| Angel Islington | Lisa Dwan |
| Jinx Jones | Sophie Dawney |
| Felix McGowan | Adam Leese |
| Declan O'Brien | Shane McDaid |
| Sasha Reed | Helen Modern |
| Pete Shepherd | James Anderson |
| Lucy Stone | Amy Garcia |
| Addison Teller | Robert Sheehan |
| Jez Willard | Marcus O'Donovan |
| Sam Winwood | Gerry McCann |

== Plot ==
=== Series 1 (2008) ===
Rock Rivals follows the lives of two celebrity judges on an X Factor style show as their marriage falls apart. Talent contest judge Simon Cowell, a veteran of such shows, joined forces with Shed Media to produce the series.

== Episodes ==
| # | Episode | Writer | Director | Original airdate |
|---|---|---|---|---|
| 1 | Episode One | Liz Lake | Syd Macartney | 5 March 2008 |
Husband and wife team Mal and Karina Faith are judges on a top-rated TV talent show, but when news about Mal's affairs is broadcast to the show's contestants at an after show party, Karina calls it a day and their relationship publicly implodes. As their vicious divorce battle rages off-screen, the show's contestants are made to bear the brunt of their animosity when the cameras roll, causing one hopeful to break down during the live show.
| 2 | Episode Two | | Syd Macartney | 12 March 2008 |
When Mal drops the bombshell that Karina may not be entitled to anything in the divorce, Karina takes drastic measures to win back her advantage. Luke's estranged mother comes back into his life, but she attracts negative publicity for Luke when some shocking truths about her are revealed. Mal tries some underhand tactics to get Dana off the show, but will his plan succeed? Felix gets ever closer to the object of his affection.
| 3 | Episode Three | | Farren Blackburn | 19 March 2008 |
Mal and Karina have a lawyers' meeting to decide who owns the format of the show after she contends that she is the creator. They are forced to agree to a display of false harmony until after the show has aired in order not to damage the brand. Luke and Dana arrange to marry in secret, but he has cold feet at the last minute and jilts her - to Felix's joy. Karina finds that there's a chemistry between her and one of the contestants, Jez. But Mal thinks she is having an affair with her lawyer.
| 4 | Episode Four | | Farren Blackburn | 26 March 2008 |
Mal and Karina's daughter Ocean returns, just as her parents are due to fly to the US to pitch their show to TV stations. While they are away, Ocean decides to throw a party in hopes of seducing Luke. Lynette turns up at the contestants' house and, when Bethany confronts her, decides to take her down by selling a story about her daughter to the papers. Mal and Karina arrive in New York, but are told that Karina will not be needed if the show is commissioned.
| 5 | Episode Five | | Ian Bevitt | 2 April 2008 |
Luke and Bethany bond over the damages involved in taking part in the show, but while Bethany is excelling in the competition, Luke has gone off the rails. Mal goes on the offensive and tries to sabotage some of the other acts. Felix's relationship with Latex Luke is jeopardised when his photo of Luke is found, but will that be enough to cure his obsession? Angel shows her true colours during a promotional push, and Mal has a surprise for Karina during the live show.
| 6 | Episode Six | | Ian Bevitt | 9 April 2008 |
Mal fires Pete and reinstates Bethany, who once again shuns her mother; but Lynette digs out an old secret in an envelope and prepares to bring her daughter down. Vernon invites Fade Up to his house, but when he makes a private offer to Addison, Caleb and Carson set about plotting Addison's downfall. Felix returns to work in the house, but the signals Luke is giving off only confuse him more.
| 7 | Episode Seven | | James Erskine | 16 April 2008 |
Mal and Karina prepare to renew their vows in an elaborate and expensive ceremony, but Jinx tries to make Mal take responsibility for the baby. They day of the live final arrives, but Mal and Karina raise the stakes and agree that whoever's protege wins the competition gets everything. But with an increasingly unstable Felix trying to confront Luke, and a frustrated Lynette preparing to stop her daughter competing at whatever cost, will the live final go ahead as planned?
| 8 | Episode Eight | | James Erskine | 23 April 2008 |
Jinx finally realises that Mal has been using her to get to Karina, and that he doesn't want her to have the baby. An unconscious Luke is whisked away to the basement by Felix. Mal prepares to win the contract from Karina, but is furious when he learns that Luke is missing. As the live final is stalled, Bethany becomes unwilling to win by default as she continues to struggle with her mother's revelation. Bethany is revealed as the winner of the competition. As Felix realises his mistakes by admitting it to his dead mother who is in a coffin in his home.

== DVD release ==
The 3-disc DVD box set of Rock Rivals was released in the UK on 28 April 2009, distributed by Universal.
