= Amanda Fahy =

- Born: Amanda Fahy; 20 April 1985 (age 40); London, United Kingdom
- Years active: 2001– 2005

Amanda Fahy (born 20 April 1985) is a British actress who played Shannon Parks in the CBBC television series Grange Hill from 2001 to 2004.

She appeared in The Bill as Nikki McGrath in 2004 and a year later appeared in the Channel 4 drama Ahead of the Class.
