= Amber Hodgkiss =

British actress (born 1987)

Amber Caroline Hodgkiss (born 12 November 1991) is a British actress.

== Career ==
Her first professional job was the role of Eleanor Smith in the popular television show Grange Hill. She is known for her role as Caroline in Hollyoaks. On Hollyoaks, Hodgkiss was initially cast as character Chrissy, a former school friend of character Loretta Jones, but the character and plot line were scrapped due to their similarity to the abduction and torture of toddler James Bulger. She featured in Vogue Italia twice in 2014 and 2016. She played opposite Helen McCrory and Callum Turner in ITV Drama Leaving. She played the role of Isabella in New York Times bestselling author Alexandra Adornetto's 'Ghost House'. Amber was announced as one of the participants of the BAFTA 2015/2016 Newcomers Programme. In 2016, Amber Played Jen in 'Don't Mess With Julie Whitfield' alongside Casey Wilson and Mary Elizabeth Ellis, which premiered at the 2017 Tribeca Film Festival. She plays Ginny in The Netflix Movie, Like Father opposite Seth Rogen, Kristen Bell, Kelsey Grammer and Paul W. Downs. Amber plays Kelly in Nothing to See Here alongside Kate Burton teaming up again with Director Amy Barham. She can be seen on the Amazon Prime show Errands loosely based on her real life, which she executive produced, co-wrote and starred in. The cast also includes June Diane Raphael, Betsy Sodaro, Ike Barinholtz

== Filmography ==
=== Film ===
- Like Father Netflix (2018) as Ginny
- Don't Mess with Julie Whitfield
- Speak (2016, as Jen)
- Ghost House (2014, as Isabella) Alexandra Adornetto
- The Spell (2009, as Vicky)

=== Television ===
- Casualty (2014) 1 Episode
- Grange Hill (2005–2007, as Eleanor Smith, 17 episodes)
- Doctors (2008, as Kyla Myles, 1 episode)
- Proper Messy (2009, as Sophie, 1 episode)
- Hollyoaks (2010, as Caroline, 6 episodes)
- Bedlam (2011, as Emma, 1 episode)
- Leaving (2012)
