= Mia Smith =

British actress

- Born: Mia Smith; 13 May 1994 (age 32); Salford, Greater Manchester, England
- Education: Buile Hill High School; Salford City College
- Occupation: Actress
- Years active: 2000–present

Mia Smith (born 13 May 1994) is an English actress, best known for her role as Chloe Moore in Grange Hill.

== Career ==
Smith appeared in a Max Speilman camera advert in 2000. In 2003, Smith appeared in Blue Murder for 2 episodes as Jade. She then went on to play Susie Dane in 1 episode of The Courtroom. Smith then went on to play the regular role of school bully Chloe Moore in the teen drama, Grange Hill from 2005 to 2008. Smith played Katy Black in an episode of Accused. Smith played Barry's wife in The Spencer-Green Project in 2012.

== Filmography ==
Year	Title	Role	Notes
2004	Blue Murder	Jade	2 episodes
2004	The Courtroom	Susie Dane	1 episode
2005–08	Grange Hill	Chloe Moore	Regular role
2010	Accused	Katy Black	1 episode
2012	The Spencer-Green Project	Barry's wife	Short
