= Edward Baker-Duly =

British actor

- Born: Stockholm, Sweden
- Occupation: Actor

Edward Baker-Duly is a British actor.

== Early life and education ==
Edward Baker-Duly was born in Stockholm, Sweden, of British and Swedish parents. He spent his early life in South Africa.

== Career ==
=== Screen ===
Baker-Duly's UK television work includes playing Joe Fisher, the Australian partner of gay builder Jason Kirk, in the ITV1 soap Emmerdale. He played no-nonsense sports master Chris Malachay in the long-running BBC school drama, Grange Hill, from 2003 to 2006.

He completed filming Botched alongside Stephen Dorff in 2006, and played the entrepreneur Hermann Hauser in the BBC comedy drama show Micro Men. In December 2010 he played Joachim von Ribbentrop in the BBC Wales/Masterpiece reprise of Upstairs, Downstairs.

In 2016, he appeared in the Showtime series Billions first season's final episode "The Conversation".

In 2021, he appeared in Hollyoaks as Clarke.

=== Stage ===
In theatre he appeared in West Side Story directed by Arthur Laurents, South Pacific, directed by Trevor Nunn, and originated the role of Ashley Wilkes in Nunn's West End musical adaptation of Gone With The Wind in 2008. He also appeared in Rookery Nook at the Menier Chocolate Factory.

In 2011, he created the role of the Hickory/Tin Man in Andrew Lloyd Webber's West End production of The Wizard of Oz at the London Palladium.

In 2013 he moved to New York City, and appeared in the Off-Broadway production of Peter and the Starcatcher.

In 2019, he played The Grinch in the UK tour of Dr. Seuss' How the Grinch Stole Christmas! The Musical. In 2023, he played military policeman Calloway in a musical theatre version of The Third Man in London.

In 2024, he played Max in the world premiere of Here & Now, a jukebox musical based on the songs of Steps at The Alexandra, Birmingham, before touring the UK and Ireland from August 2025.

== Filmography ==
=== Film ===
Year	Title	Role	Notes
2004	De-Lovely	Boris Kochno	
2007	Botched	Killer	Credited as Edward Duly Baker
2023	The Boys in the Boat	Benjamin Billings	
2024	Blackwater Lane	Dr. Deakins	

=== Television ===
Year	Title	Role	Notes
2009	Micro Men	Hermann Hauser	TV Movie
2016	Billions	Travel Agent	1 episode
2022	A Spy Among Friends	Ian Fleming	Episode: "The Admiral's Glass"
2023	Doctors	Donald Tunnell	Episode: "Monstrous Regimen of Women"
