= Jacqueline Boatswain =

British actress

- Born: Bedford, England
- Occupation: Actress
- Television: Grange Hill; Shameless; Hollyoaks

Jacqueline Boatswain is a British actress of Vincentian origin.

== Career ==
She is known for playing headmistress Mrs Bassinger in the long-running BBC school drama, Grange Hill, from 2003 to 2006. The character's first name has never been revealed, but according to the sign outside her head teacher's office it starts with "S". Mrs Bassinger was not seen during the 2007 series, her function in the programme taken over by Cathy Tyson as deputy head, Miss Gayle. It was not known if Boatswain would return to Grange Hill, however the show has now been cancelled. In addition to Grange Hill, Boatswain has appeared in Casualty, and as a police custody sergeant in the BBC daytime drama Doctors. She also has extensive stage experience. In October 2013, she appeared in Sarah Rutherford's Adult Supervision at Park Theatre (London).

She has also appeared in Life on Mars and The Royal. In 2013, she joined the cast of popular Channel 4 comedy drama series, Shameless, for the final ever series playing Patreesha St. Rose. She also played Victoria Sweeney in Wolfblood from 2014-2016 and Eileen the Crow in the 2015 video game Bloodborne. Boatswain joined the cast of Channel 4 soap opera, Hollyoaks as regular cast member, Simone Loveday on 20 February 2015. Hollyoaks aired a Come Dine with Me special week to celebrate their twentieth anniversary, with Boatswain as one of the cast members hosting. Boatswain left Hollyoaks in late 2018 with her exit airing on 23 January 2019. In 2018, she also played a role as Monique in the BBC Drama Collateral. In 2020, Boatswain appeared in the BBC TV series Shakespeare & Hathaway: Private Investigators in episode 3.6 "Reputation, Reputation, Reputation!" as Odette Dixon. Then in October 2021, she appeared in an episode of the BBC soap opera Doctors as Heather Derby. In 2023 she played the part of bar owner/singer Babette Francois in series 12, episode 8 of Death in Paradise.

== Filmography ==
Key
†	Denotes projects that have not yet been released

=== Film ===
Year	Title	Role	Notes	Ref.
1989	Goldeneye	Candice	Television film	
2004	London Voodoo	Ruth		
2013	Working Lunge	Boss	Short film	
2020	Agatha and the Midnight Murders	Audrey Evans	Television film	
2021	The Visit	Ansa	Short film	
2022	Fantastic Beasts: The Secrets of Dumbledore	Ida Webb		

=== Television ===
Year	Title	Role	Notes	Ref.
1988	Red Dwarf	Dancer	Episode: "Parallel Universe"	
1990	A Bit of Fry & Laurie	Dancer	Episode: "Series 2, Episode 1"	
2001	Doctors	WPC Linda Derwent	Episode: "Cop Out"	
2001	EastEnders	DC Bellis	Recurring role; 2 episodes	
2002	Casualty	Diamond Cusack	Episode: "Big Rocks and Very Hard Places"	
2003	Doctors	Duty Sergeant	Episode: "Zero Tolerance"	
2003–2005	Grange Hill	Mrs Bassinger	Series regular; 50 episodes	
2004	Doctors	Sergeant Bevan	Episode: "Look Ma, No Hands"	
2004	Doctors	Custody Sergeant	Episode: "Misconceptions"	
2005	Casualty	Karen Blythe	Recurring role; 3 episodes	
2007	Life on Mars	DC Brown	Episode: "Series 2, Episode 8"	
2007	The Royal	Safi	Recurring role; 2 episodes	
2007	Little Devil	Bernie	Miniseries; 1 episode	
2008	Mistresses	Jenny	Episode: "Men Behaving Badly"	
2008	Torchwood	Plummer	Episode: "Reset	
2011	Silk	Alicia	Episode: "All Plain Sailing"	
2011	The Importance of Being Whatever	Kathy	Miniseries; 2 episodes	
2013	Shameless	Patreesha St Rose	Recurring role; 9 episodes	
2014	In the Club	Louise Stretton	Recurring role; 3 episodes	
2014	Bad Education	Governor	Episode: "Strike"	
2014	Doctors	Celeste Baptiste	Episode: "Baked"	
2014–2016	Wolfblood	Victoria Sweeney	Series regular; 10 episodes	
2014–2018	Cuckoo	Jane Defreitas	Recurring role; 6 episodes	
2015	Banana	Pamela Scott	Episode: "Episode 2"	
2015	River	Ursula	Episode: "Episode 1"	
2015–2019	Hollyoaks	Simone Loveday	Series regular; 246 episodes	
2017	Hospital People	Doctor	Recurring role; 3 episodes	
2018	Collateral	Monique	Miniseries; 3 episodes	
2020	Bancroft	Chief Constable Frances Holland	Recurring role; 3 episodes	
2020	Vera	Sarah Ashers	Episode: "Dirty"	
2020	Shakespeare & Hathaway: Private Investigators	Odette Dixon	Episode: "Reputation, Reputation, Reputation!"	
2020	Miracle Workers	Queen Gamillagoor	Episode: "Dark Ages: Holiday"	
2020	Alex Rider	Immigration Officer Powell	Episode: "Lies"	
2020	Strike	Claire Morbury	Episode: "Lethal White: Part 1"	
2021	Finding Alice	Administrator	Episode: "Episode 5"	
2021	Midsomer Murders	Rachel Taylor	Episode: "Scarecrow Murders"	
2021	Doctors	Heather Derby	Episode: "The Favourite"	
2022	Ridley	Janet Venables	Episode: "Hospitality"	
2023	Extraordinary	Miriam	Episode: "Magic Bullets"	
2023	The Chemistry of Death	Diana Maitland	Episode: "Where the Wind Blows"	
2023	The Madame Blanc Mysteries	Chloe	Episode: "Series 2, Episode 6"	
2023	Death in Paradise	Babette Francois	Episode: "A Calypso Caramba"	
2023	Carnival Row	Mima Blodwen	Recurring role; 4 episodes	
2023	The Diplomat	Elaine Simms	Episode: "Don't Call It a Kidnapping"	
2023	Still Up	Anne Cooper	Episode: "The Pharmacy"	
2023	The Good Ship Murder	Wendy Watson	Episode: "At Sea"	
2024	Avoidance	Professor Dorian Gillespie	Episode: "Series 2, Episode 3"	
2024–2026	After the Flood	Sarah Mackie	Series regular; 9 episodes	
2025	Little Disasters	Sheila Foster	Episode: "The Perfect Mother"	
2025	The Sandman	Prime Minister Zewde	Episode: "Season of Mists"	
2026	Red Eye	Prime Minister	Recurring role; 2 episodes	
2026	The Marlow Murder Club	Debbie Smith	Recurring role; 2 episodes	
2026	The Blame †	Jasmine Dunn	Post-production	
2027	Bridgerton †	Helen Stirling	Filming	

=== Video games ===
Year	Title	Role	Notes
2013	Assassin's Creed IV: Black Flag	Additional Multiplayer Voices	
2015	Bloodborne	Eileen the Crow / Yharnamite (F1)	
2017	Xenoblade Chronicles 2	Additional Voices	
2018	World of Warcraft: Battle for Azeroth	Voice	

== Theatre credits ==
Year	Title	Role	Venue	Notes	Ref.
1990–1991	Cats	Tantomile	New London Theatre, London		
1992–1994	Carousel	Mrs Mullins	Shaftesbury Theatre, London		
1994–1995	Cats	Bombalurina	UK Tour		
1996–1998	Jesus Christ Superstar	Soul Girl	Lyceum Theatre, London		
1997–1998	Chicago	June / Mama Morton (1st Cover)	Adelphi Theatre, London		
2003	The White Devil	Zanche	Mercury Theatre, Colchester		
2004–2005	Cinderella	Fairy Godmother	Queen's Theatre, Barnstaple		
2005–2006	Cinderella	Fairy Godmother	The Playhouse, Weston-super-Mare		
2006	Sleeping Beauty	The Wicked Fairy	Harlequin Theatre, Redhill		
2008	Gone with the Wind	Dilcey	New London Theatre, London		
2008–2009	The Lion, the Witch and the Wardrobe	Mrs Beaver / Mrs McCready	Birmingham Repertory Theatre, Birmingham		
2009	Looking for Buddy	Zelda	Live Theatre, Newcastle		
2009–2010	The Way You Look Tonight	Woman	Salisbury Playhouse, Salisbury		
2011	To Kill a Mockingbird	Calpurnia	Theatre Royal, York & UK tour	with Touring Consortium Theatre Company	
2011	One Monkey Don't Stop No Show	Mrs Caldwell / Mozelle	Tricycle Theatre, London		
2012	Doubt: A Parable	Mrs Muller	Town Hall Theatre, Galway & Everyman Palace Theatre, Cork		
2013	The Amen Corner	Sister Boxer	Olivier Theatre, London		
2013	Adult Supervision	Angela	Park Theatre, London		
2013–2014	Coriolanus	Valeria	Donmar Warehouse, London		
2019	Small Island	Miss Ma	Olivier Theatre, London		
2024	Pericles	Cerimon / Bawd	Swan Theatre, Stratford-upon-Avon & Chicago Shakespeare Theater, Chicago	with Royal Shakespeare Company	
