= Holly Quin-Ankrah =

British actress

- Born: 27 August 1987 (age 38); Warrington, Cheshire, England
- Occupation: Actress
- Years active: 2003–present

Holly Quin-Ankrah (born 27 August 1987), known professionally as Rahh (stylised in all caps), is a British actress. She began her acting career as a teenager, playing Karen Young in the long-running CBBC drama series Grange Hill. She is also known for her lead role on the talent show drama Rock Rivals and a regular role as Cheryl Gray on Coronation Street between 2010 and 2011.

== Early life ==
Quin-Ankrah was born and raised in Warrington, Cheshire. She attended Bridgewater High School and then Mid Cheshire College, where she completed a two-year National Diploma in Fashion.

== Life and career ==
Quin-Ankrah's first role was as Karen Young on the CBBC drama Grange Hill as a teenager, despite having no acting training. Whilst a cast member on Grange Hill she engaged in philanthropic ventures. In December 2004 she visited St. Francis Xavier's College, Woolton, Liverpool to promote MEND, a national mobile phone database for stolen or lost equipment. In April 2006 she visited Alder Hey children's hospital to donate Easter Eggs to sick children.

Following Grange Hill, Quin-Ankrah played a lead role in the 2008 ITV talent show drama Rock Rivals as "contestant" Bethany Hopkins. In 2009 she appeared in an episode of the sixth series of Shameless as Geena. In February 2010 it was reported that Quin-Ankrah had been cast in the soap-opera Coronation Street as Cheryl Gray, a love interest for established character Lloyd Mullaney (Craig Charles). Quin-Ankrah was 22 at the time of joining the soap but did not reveal her age at the casting as Cheryl was intended to be significantly older, with a ten-year-old son. Of her audition, Quin Ankrah recalls: "My agent told me not to say how old I was. I wore tweed flares and a highnecked top so I looked older!" In July 2010, Quin-Ankrah received a nomination in the "Best Newcomer" category at the 2010 Inside Soap Awards for her portrayal of Cheryl. She departed the serial in November 2011.

Quin-Ankrah's theatre credits include playing the role of Katie in a 2009 stage musical adaptation of the Willy Russell drama Our Day Out at the Royal Court, Liverpool.

Quin-Ankrah has since become a backing singer for Liam Gallagher under the stage name ‘Rahh’.

== Filmography ==
Year	Title	Role	Notes
2003–2007	Grange Hill	Karen Young	Series regular
2008	Rock Rivals	Bethany Hopkins	Series regular
2009	Shameless	Geena	One episode: episode #6.4
2010–2011	Coronation Street	Cheryl Gray	Series regular
2013	The Dumping Ground	Shannay Kelly	Recurring Role; Series 1, 2 episodes
2015	Death in Paradise	Alison Turner	Episode 4.6
