= Matthew Buckley =

British actor

Matthew Buckley (born 1987 or 1988) is a British actor, best known for playing Martin Miller in the BBC school drama Grange Hill from 2001 to 2007.

The Martin character has Asperger syndrome, an autism spectrum disorder. Buckley has worked with the National Autistic Society to promote awareness of autism spectrum disorder.
