= Chris Perry-Metcalf =

British actor

- Born: Chris Perry-Metcalf; 11 January 1989 (age 37); Liverpool, England
- Years active: 2003–2014

Christopher Perry-Metcalf (born 11 January 1989) is a former child actor who is best known for playing a Grange Hill pupil called Togger Johnson. Perry-Metcalf is also a professional boxer. He boxed on the Sky Sports Undercard at Liverpool Echo Arena of Tony Bellew.

He was in the 2008 series of BBC3's Celebrity Scissorhands, where celebrities learn to cut hair and do other beauty treatments, raising money for BBC Children In Need.
