= Harger =

Harger is a surname. Notable people with the surname include:

- Elaine Harger, American librarian
- Honor Harger (born 1975), New Zealand curator and artist
- Nathan Harger, American photographer
- Oscar Harger (1843–1887), American paleontologist and invertebrate zoologist
- Rolla Neil Harger (1890-1983), American biochemist, inventor of Drunkometer

== See also ==
- Barger
