= Impaired driving in Canada =

Operating a vehicle under the influence of alcohol or a drug

In Canada, impaired driving is the criminal offence of operating a motor vehicle while the person's ability to operate the vehicle is impaired by alcohol or a drug. The offence includes having care or control of a motor vehicle while the person's ability to operate the motor vehicle is impaired by alcohol or a drug. Impaired driving is punishable under multiple offences in the Criminal Code, with greater penalties depending on the harm caused by the impaired driving. It can also result in various types of driver's licence suspensions.

There is a related, parallel offence of driving with a blood alcohol level (BAC) which exceeds eighty milligrams of alcohol in one hundred millilitres of blood (.08). The penalties are identical for impaired driving and driving with a BAC greater than .08.

The Criminal Code gives peace officers a number of powers to assist in the enforcement of the applicable laws, and there are a number of presumptions that assist in the prosecution of offences.

== History ==
One of the first reported criminal cases regarding drinking and driving in Canada was an Alberta decision in 1920 called R. v. Nickle. In that case, the appeal court found that the act of driving while intoxicated was an unlawful act that could support a manslaughter conviction.

In 1921, the Parliament of Canada first created a summary conviction offence for drinking and driving, called "driving while intoxicated". At the time, the courts interpreted intoxication to mean substantial inebriation, and more than just being under the influence of alcohol. The minimum penalty for the first offence was seven days in jail. The minimum penalty for the second offence was one month in jail. The minimum penalty for a third offence was three months in jail.

In 1925, Parliament amended the Criminal Code to include a new offence of driving while intoxicated by a narcotic. The offences were also amended to include "care or control" of a motor vehicle, not just driving.

In 1930, Parliament changed the offence to a hybrid offence, giving the Crown prosecutor the option to proceed with the more serious indictable offence procedure.

Difficulties arose regarding how to prove someone was in care or control of a motor vehicle, and what the test should be. In 1947, Parliament amended the Criminal Code, adding a presumption of care or control when a person was found sitting in the driver's seat of a motor vehicle. This did not answer all of the problems regarding the test (i.e. when a person is not found in the driver's seat of a motor vehicle). Many of the court's answers to those questions remain in conflict today.

In 1951, Parliament re-worded the law, making it an offence to operate or have care or control of a motor vehicle while the driver's ability to operate the motor vehicle was impaired by alcohol or other drugs.

The breathalyzer was made into a practical police tool by Robert Frank Borkenstein in 1952, which allowed for the police to measure a person's blood alcohol concentration. The first Canadian test of the breathalyzer was in Ontario in 1954. By 1962, police were using the breathalyzer for "mass testing". However, the test was voluntary, and could only be used as confirmatory evidence.

In 1969 (fifteen years after the introduction of the breathalyzer into Canada), Parliament created an offence of driving while "over 80" (over 80 milligrams of alcohol per 100 millilitres of blood). In 1976, Parliament made the penalty the same as driving while impaired, created the offence of refusing to provide a breath sample (with the same penalties), and created laws allowing the police to use roadside screening devices. Both offences are now set out in the same section of the Criminal Code, section 320.14.

After 1976, there were additional changes to the minimum penalties, and the introduction of new offences (impaired driving causing bodily harm and impaired driving causing death).

By 2008, drinking and driving cases made up 12 per cent of all criminal charges, making it the largest single offence group. In 2008, it was estimated that 53,000 drinking and driving cases are heard every year in Canada. The conviction rate was 73 per cent, which exceeded the rate for all criminal convictions by 13 per cent. Notwithstanding the higher rate of conviction, drinking and driving cases are more likely to go to trial than any other criminal offence, and are often fought on both technical issues and alleged police violations of section 8, section 9, and section 10(b) of the Canadian Charter of Rights and Freedoms.

2008 also saw the most recent amendments by Parliament to the law on drinking and driving. The Tackling Violent Crime Act came into force on July 2, 2008. The changes included adding new evidentiary restrictions on defendants trying to raise "evidence to the contrary" regarding the presumption of a person's blood alcohol concentration, created mandatory standard field sobriety tests that can be requested by a police officer, created additional means to allow police officers to test for the possible presence of drugs in a driver's body, increased the minimum sentences to their current level ($1000 fine for the first offence, 30 days in jail for the second offence, and 120 days in jail for the third offence), and created new offences for "over 80" causing death or bodily harm and refusing to provide a sample where operation caused death or bodily harm.

On June 21, 2018, Bill C-46 received royal assent, and Part One of the bill immediately came into effect by amending the Criminal Code to include cannabis-related driving offences to account for the legalization of cannabis with the passing of the Cannabis Act on the same day. On December 18, 2018, Part Two of the bill came into effect, and replaced all the existing driving provisions with a new comprehensive regime in the largest update since 1985. Altogether, the 2018 changes included mandatory alcohol screening requirements, limits on the amount of legal drugs drivers could have in their system, as well as an expanded "80 or over" offence. Part Two carried more severe immigration-related consequences for both permanent residents and foreign nationals convicted of an impaired driving offence. It also increased the maximum sentence from five to ten years.

== Testing for alcohol and drugs ==
=== Approved instrument demands ===
If a police officer has reasonable grounds that a person has committed an offence under section 253 within the past two hours due to alcohol, they can demand that a person provide suitable breath samples into an approved instrument. The results of those samples may be introduced as evidence at a later trial. If it is later determined that the officer did not have reasonable grounds, then the taking of the breath samples violated the protection against unreasonable searches and seizures under section 8 of the Canadian Charter of Rights and Freedoms and the person can apply to have them excluded as evidence under section 24(2) of the Charter.

Police officers can obtain reasonable grounds from observations they make and information they receive, including the results of the other demands listed below.

These breath samples are typically taken at a police station by a qualified technician, after a person has been arrested.

==== Blood samples ====
If a person is unable to give breath samples (usually due to injuries suffered from a traffic collision), a police officer can make a demand for blood samples, under the direction of a medical doctor, and performed by the same doctor or a nurse.

=== Approved screening device demands ===
If a police officer has a reasonable suspicion that a person has alcohol in his or her body, and that he or she has been operating or has had care or control of a vehicle within the past three hours, the police officer can demand that person provide a suitable sample into an approved screening device. These devices are usually calibrated to display fail if a person has a BAC above 0.1 percent, warn or caution if a person has a BAC between 0.05 and 0.1 percent, and a numerical value if the person has a BAC below 0.05 percent.

These breath samples are typically taken at the roadside by an investigating police officer. Typical observations supporting a reasonable suspicion is if a driver has an odour of an alcoholic beverage on their breath, or if they admit they had a drink.

=== Field sobriety tests ===
If a police officer has a reasonable suspicion that a person has alcohol or drugs in their body, and that they have been operating or have had care or control of a vehicle within the past three hours, they can demand that that person perform physical coordination tests, referred to as Standardized Field Sobriety Tests (SFSTs). SFSTs are requested in order to allow the officer to establish "reasonable grounds" for making an approved instrument demand, by establishing that there is reasonable and probable cause which lies at the point where "point where credibly-based probability replaces suspicion". "Reasonable grounds" is necessary to sustain the use of evidence obtained from the approved instrument demand, blood demand, or drug evaluation demand, and thereby support a conviction based on that demand.

Commentary varies on whether a suspect can refuse taking SFSTs in Canada. Some sources, especially official ones, indicate that the SFSTs are mandatory, whereas other sources are silent on FST testing. Section 254(2)(a) of the Criminal Code provides that, "If a peace officer has reasonable grounds to suspect that a person has alcohol or a drug in their body and that the person has, within the preceding three hours, operated a motor vehicle ... the peace officer may, by demand, require the person ... to perform forthwith physical coordination tests." The assertion regarding mandatory compliance with an SFST demand is based on "failure to comply with a demand", as an offence under section 254(5) of the Criminal Code, but it is unclear whether section 254(5) applies to refusal of SFSTs (provided the suspect agrees to take an approved instrument chemical test).

There are some reports that refusal to submit to an SFST can result in the same penalties as impaired driving. Nevertheless, it is unclear whether there has ever been a prosecution under this interpretation of "failure to comply with a demand" as applied to SFSTs. Sections 254(1) and (5) of the Criminal Code address this point, but only with respect to chemical testing (breath, blood, etc.)

Of note, it is generally advised to comply with a demand to submit to the approved instrument chemical test. A legal challenge to sufficiency of "reasonable grounds" to submit to the approved instrument demand, blood demand, or drug evaluation demand, is typically addressed in court, under the Exclusionary Rule.

=== Drug evaluations ===
If a police officer has reasonable grounds that a person has committed an offence under section 253 within the past three hours due to drugs or a combination of drugs and alcohol, they can demand that the person submit to an evaluation by an evaluating officer to determine if the person is impaired by drugs or a combination of drugs and alcohol. If the evaluating officer has reasonable grounds that the person is impaired by alcohol, they can make an approved instrument demand. If the evaluating officer has reasonable grounds that the person is impaired by drugs or a combination of drugs and alcohol, they can make a demand for blood or urine samples. Fatigue toxins and effects due to illness have been held to be drugs for the purposes of the statute.

=== Refusing to comply ===
If any of the above demands are lawfully made, it is a criminal offence to fail or refuse to comply with them, unless the person can show they had a reasonable excuse. The penalties are identical to the penalties for other drinking and driving offences.

== Proving blood alcohol concentration ==
When a person gives a breath sample into an approved instrument by a qualified technician, a determination still needs to be made of what the person's BAC was at the time of the offence. That requires evidence of two things:

- The person's BAC at the time of giving the breath samples, and
- Based on the person's BAC at the time of giving the breath samples, the person's BAC at the time of the offence.

=== Presumption of accuracy ===
To work out the person's BAC at the time of giving the breath samples, the prosecutor can rely on a Certificate of a Qualified Technician, which states what the results were of the analysis of the breath samples, and is evidence of its contents. This is commonly referred to as the presumption of accuracy. It is still open for the defence to call evidence showing why the results are not accurate, leaving it for the court to weigh the evidence.

If there is no Certificate, or the Certificate is flawed, the prosecutor can always call the qualified technician to give evidence about the accuracy of the results. The prosecutor may still call the qualified technician if there is a Certificate in order to counter the defence's evidence.

Typically, the Certificate will round the BAC results down to a hundredth of a percentage (e.g. 0.116 percent is truncated to 0.11 percent).

=== Presumption of identity ===
To work out the person's BAC at the time of the offence, the prosecutor generally needs to show the following:

- The breath samples were taken as soon as practicable,
- The first breath sample was taken within two hours of the offence, and
- A second breath sample was taken 15 minutes or more after the first sample.

If the three criteria are met, then the lower of the two results is presumed to be the person's BAC at the time of the offence. This is commonly referred to as the presumption of identity.

The presumption can be rebutted two ways, depending on whether the defence is challenging the accuracy of the results. If defence is challenging the accuracy of the results, they need call evidence that shows:

- the approved instrument was malfunctioning or not being operated properly,
- the malfunction or improper operation resulted in a reading of a BAC in excess of 0.08 percent, and
- the person's BAC would not have been in excess of 0.08 at the time of the offence.

The last criterion is typically met by calling reliable evidence of how much the person had to drink prior to the offence, and expert evidence of what their BAC would have been at the time of the offence as a result of the drinking evidence.

If defence is not challenging the accuracy of the results, they only need to call evidence on the last criterion, and have the expert give evidence why it would not be inconsistent with the breath sample readings. (This is typically called the "bolus drinking" scenario, primarily in Canadian jurisprudence.)

If the prosecutor is unable to rely on the presumption of identity (usually because the first reading was taken outside of the two hours), they can still "read-back" the readings by calling their own expert evidence.

== Sentencing ==
A person convicted for any drinking and driving offence (which includes a refuse to comply offence) faces an automatic Canada-wide driving prohibition, and either a fine or jail sentence and the possibility of probation.

The minimum sentences are:

- For a first offence, a $1000 fine and a 12-month driving prohibition,
- For a second offence, 30 days of jail and a 24-month driving prohibition, and
- For a third or subsequent offence, 120 days of jail and a 36-month driving prohibition.

Drinking and driving offences are prior offences for refuse to comply offences, and vice versa.

If no one is hurt or killed, and the prosecutor is proceeding by summary conviction, the maximum sentence is 2 years less a day. If no one is hurt or killed, and the prosecutor is proceeding by indictment, the maximum sentence is 10 years of jail.

If another person suffers bodily harm because of the offence, the maximum sentence is 14 years in jail.

If another person is killed because of the offence, the maximum sentence is a life sentence.

If a person is convicted of both impaired operation/care or control and operation/care or control with a BAC in excess of 0.08 percent, the defendant can only be sentenced for one of the offences (the prosecutor chooses which one). The same does not apply if a person is also convicted of a refuse to comply offence.

A province is allowed to set up special ignition interlock device programs specifically to limit criminal driving prohibitions. Not all provinces have such specific programs, but if they do, and a person is enrolled in one, then they can drive during their prohibition period with an interlock device, beginning as follows:

- For a first offence, 3 months after the day of sentence,
- For a second offence, 6 months after the day of sentence, and
- For a third offence or subsequent offence, 12 months after the day of sentence.

Driving otherwise while on a driving prohibition is a criminal offence.

=== Driving Prohibitions vs. Suspensions ===
Canada is a federal state, and responsibility for road safety with respect to drunk driving falls on both Parliament and the provincial legislatures. Typically after an impaired driving offence is committed, the accused will be subject to both a prohibition imposed under federal law (criminal law) and a driver's licence suspension under provincial law. While Parliament may prohibit an accused from driving, in the absence of provincial legislation, this does not affect the validity of the driver's licence of the accused. Nonetheless the accused may be charged with driving while prohibited under criminal law despite possessing a valid driver's licence.

Often the provincial suspensions are more severe than the criminal prohibition. For instance many jurisdictions require the accused to complete a remedial program and participate in the ignition interlock program, failing which will result in an indefinite suspension until the conditions are met. Also an accused may be suspended from driving for medical reasons if a physician reports that the accused has a serious alcohol problem likely to result in an unacceptable risk to the public should the accused operate a motor vehicle.

The Criminal Code provides that an accused may be prosecuted for either driving while prohibited or driving while disqualified. The former refers to driving in contravention of a criminal court order of prohibition while the latter refers to driving while suspended under provincial legislation relating to a suspension for an impaired driving offence.

== Administrative driver's licence suspensions ==
Administrative licence suspensions are separate from the driving prohibitions that are ordered as part of a criminal sentence. While drinking and driving are criminal offences, which is the jurisdiction of the Canadian Parliament, the provinces have jurisdiction to regulate their roads and highways (see Canadian federalism). Therefore, the provinces have the ability to administratively suspend a person's driver's licence separately from any criminal proceedings.

Licence suspensions can occur in three ways: 1) having a high BAC, but not enough to commit a criminal offence, 2) a police officer having reasonable grounds that a drinking and driving offence has occurred, and 3) being found guilty of a drinking and driving offence. Driving with a suspended licence can result in being charged with either criminal or provincial offences.

=== High blood alcohol concentration ===
When a person blows into an approved screening device, they might not register a BAC high enough for a fail, but they will still register a significantly high BAC. The provinces deal with that situation in different ways. There may also be different type of suspensions for novice drivers who are not allowed any BAC above zero.

- Alberta - Length: 24 hours; Reason: a police officer reasonably suspects the person's ability to operate a vehicle is impaired by alcohol or drug, but does not charge them with a criminal offence. While the 24 hour suspension remains on the books, drivers may also receive a 3-day non-criminal suspension and other penalties should their blood alcohol concentration test 0.05 or over (warning), but not above the criminal 0.08 (failure). New drivers will receive a 30-day non-criminal suspension for a blood alcohol concentration of greater than zero.
- British Columbia - Length: 12 hours; Reason: BAC over zero when a licence restriction is in place. Length: 3–30 days depending on prior offences; Reason: BAC over 0.05 percent.
- Manitoba, New Brunswick - Length: 24 hours; Reason: BAC over 0.05 percent.
- Newfoundland and Labrador - Length: 24 hours for the first and second suspension, 2 months for the third suspension, 4 months for the fourth suspension, 6 months for the fifth or subsequent suspension; Reason: BAC over 0.05 percent.
- Nova Scotia - Length: 7 days for the first suspension within 10 years, 15 days for the second, 30 days for the third and subsequent; Reason: BAC over 0.05 percent.
- Ontario - Length: 3 days for the first suspension, 7 days for the second suspension, 30 days for the third or subsequent suspension; Reason: BAC over 0.05 percent.
- Prince Edward Island - Length: 24 hours for the first suspension, 30 days for a second suspension within 2 years, 90 days for the third suspension within 2 years; Reason: BAC over 0.05 percent.
- Quebec does not suspend a person's licence if their BAC is below 0.08 percent (except for novice drivers).
- Saskatchewan - Length: 24 hours for the first suspension, 24 hours & 15 days for the second suspension, 24 hours & 90 days for the third or subsequent suspension; Reason: BAC over 0.04 percent.
- Northwest Territories and Nunavut - Length: 24 hours for the first suspension, 30 days for a subsequent suspension; Reason: BAC over 0.05 percent.
- Yukon - Length: 24 hours; Reason: a police officer has reasonable grounds the driver is impaired.

=== Committing an offence ===
If an officer has reasonable grounds to believe a person has committed a drinking and driving offence, besides being allowed to arrest the person, the provinces will suspend the person's driver's licence for a period of time. The same suspensions apply if the person refuses to comply with a breath demand.

- Alberta - 90 days generally; 6 months if bodily harm or death is caused.
- British Columbia, Manitoba, New Brunswick, Newfoundland and Labrador, Nova Scotia, Ontario, Prince Edward Island, Quebec, Saskatchewan, Northwest Territories, Nunavut, Yukon - 90 days.

=== Found guilty of an offence ===
Provinces will suspend a person's driver's licence for a lengthy period of time if they have been found guilty of a drinking and driving offence, and will usually require various types of programs to be completed before or after a licence is reinstated. When programs are required to be completed, the driver is also required to pay the cost.

- Alberta - 1 year for the first offence, 3 years for a second offence, 5 years for the third or subsequent offence. A rehabilitative course may be required.
- British Columbia - 1 year for the first offence, 3 years for the second offence, indefinitely for the third or subsequent offence. A rehabilitative program, which may include an interlock device program, must be completed.
- Manitoba - 1 year for the first offence (2 years for refusing to comply and no other offences), 5 years for the second offence (7 years for refusing to comply and no other offences), 10 years for the third offence, life for the fourth or subsequent offence; If the offence was committed while there was a passenger in the car 16 years old or younger, or caused death or bodily harm, 5 years for the first offence, 10 years for the second offence, life for the third or subsequent offence. If it is a subsequent offence, or if it had a passenger in the car 16 years old or younger, or death or bodily harm was caused, an interlock device will be required.
- New Brunswick - 1 year. A drinking driving course is required.
- Newfoundland and Labrador - 1 year for the first offence, 3 years for the second offence, 5 years for the third offence, life for the fourth or subsequent offence; 10 years if bodily harm or death was caused. Rehabilitative programs, interlock programs, and alcohol/drug screenings may be required.
- Nova Scotia - 1 year for the first offence, 3 years for the second offence, indefinitely for the third or subsequent offence. For the second and subsequent offences, a driver must have an interview with Drug Dependency Services.
- Ontario - 1 year for the first offence, 3 years for the second offence, and indefinitely for the third or subsequent offence. They may have to complete a remedial program before have their licence re-issued. The driver will need to have an interlock device for a prescribed period of time.
- Prince Edward Island - 1 year for the first offence, 3 years for the second offence, 5 years for the third or subsequent offence. A rehabilitation program may be required.
- Quebec - 1 year for the first offence, 3 years for the second offence, 5 years for the third or subsequent offence. If the licence suspension is longer than the driving prohibition, a driver may be able to drive after the prohibition is completed with an interlock device. A rehabilitative course is required.
- Saskatchewan - 1 for the first offence, 3 years for the second offence, 5 years for the third or subsequent offence.
- Northwest Territories and Nunavut - 1 year for the first offence, 3 years for the second offence, 5 years for the third offence, indefinite for the fourth or subsequent offence. If death is caused, the period is indefinite. A number of rehabilitative programs may be required.
- Yukon - 1 year for the first offence, 3 years for the second offence, indefinitely for the third or subsequent offence.

== See also ==
- Driving under the influence
- MADD Canada
