= William Duncan McNally =

American chemist (1882–1961)

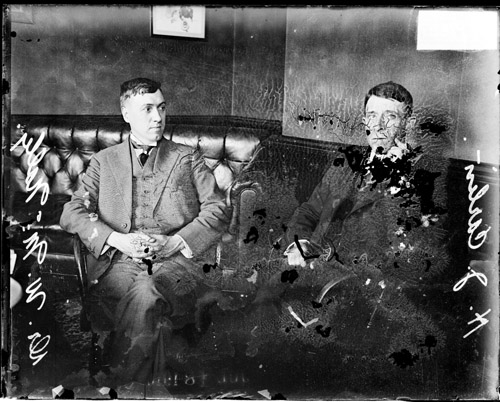
Chemist, Dr. William Duncan McNally, and H. J. Carlin, sitting in a room in 1916

William Duncan McNally (July 8, 1882 – June 29, 1961) was the chief chemist in the Cook County Department of Public Health and the chief chemist for the Cook County Medical Examiner's office. He invented an early breathalyzer in 1927.

He was a holder of M.D.

== Biography ==
William Duncan McNally was born on July 8, 1882, in Saginaw, Michigan, to Elizabeth and Edward Henry McNally. He graduated from the University of Michigan in 1905.

He married Helen Marie Pierce on September 22, 1906, in Chicago, Illinois. By 1911 he was working as a chemist at Armour and Company in East St. Louis, Illinois.

By 1918 he was the toxicologist for the Cook County Department of Public Health. He invented an early breathalyzer in 1927.

He died on June 29, 1961, in Mobile, Alabama.

== Works ==
- Medical Jurisprudence and Toxicology (1939)
- Toxicology (1937)
