= Breathalyzer =

Device to estimate blood alcohol concentration

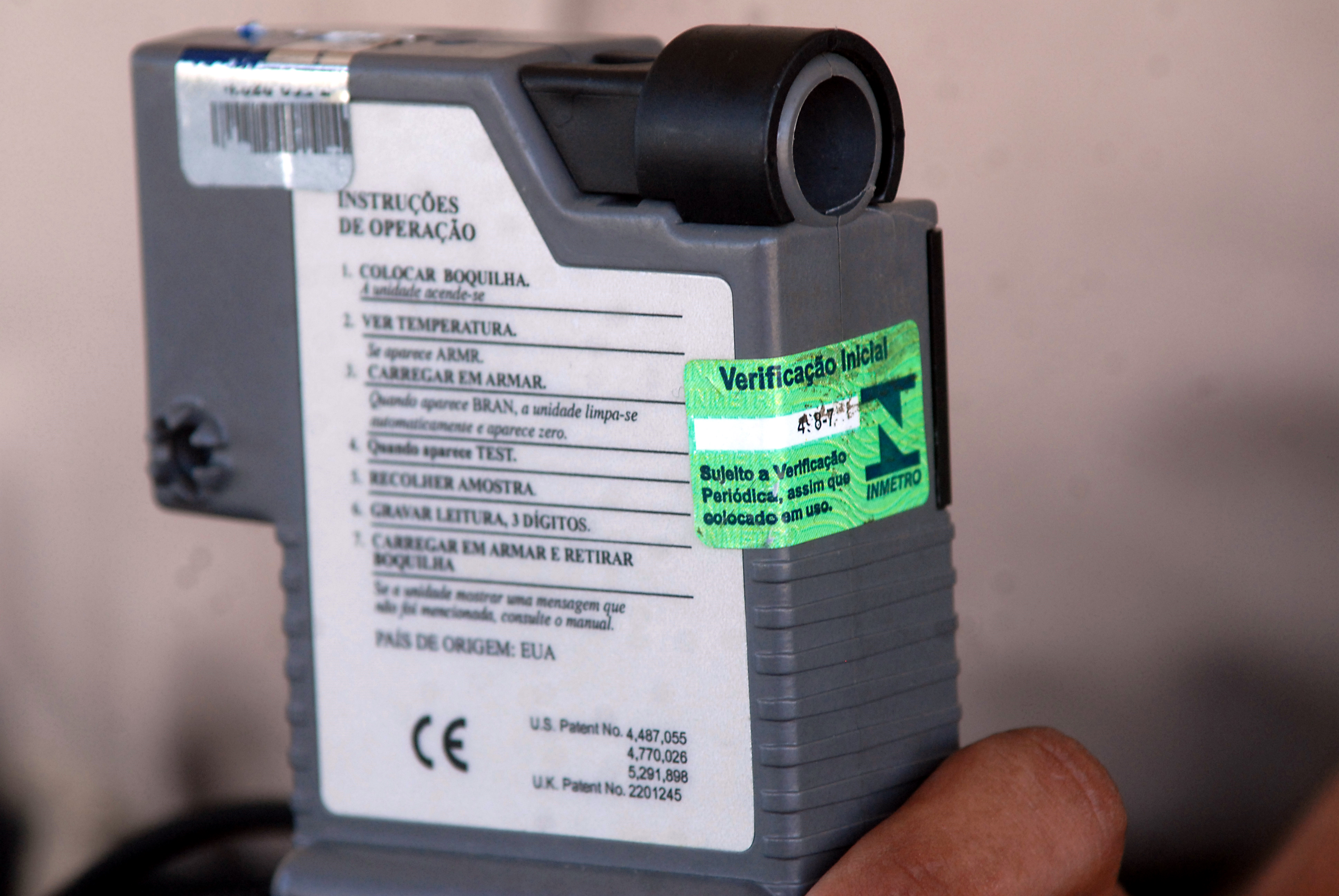
An Alco-Sensor IV law enforcement grade breathalyzer

A breathalyzer or breathalyser (a portmanteau of breath and analyzer/analyser), also called an alcohol meter, is a device for measuring breath alcohol content (BrAC). It is commonly utilized by law enforcement officers whenever they initiate traffic stops. The name is a genericized trademark of the Breathalyzer brand name of instruments developed by inventor Robert Frank Borkenstein in the 1950s.

== Origins ==
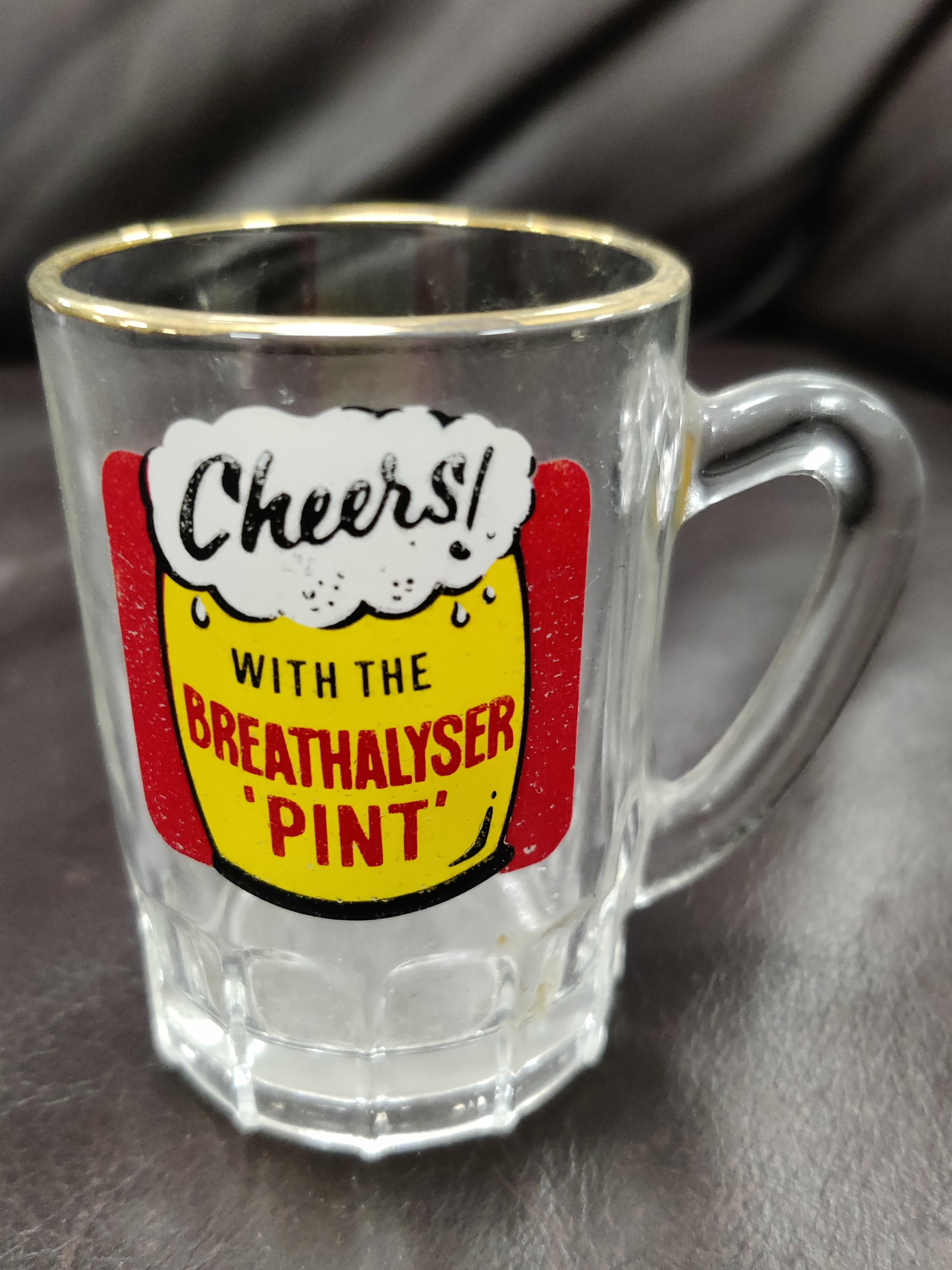
Novelty beer glass, about 2 inches tall, dating from around the time of the introduction of breathalysers in the United Kingdom, in 1967.

Research into the possibilities of using breath to test for alcohol in a person's body dates as far back as 1874, when Francis E. Anstie made the observation that small amounts of alcohol were excreted in breath.

In 1927, Emil Bogen produced a paper on breath analysis. He collected air in a football bladder and then tested this air for traces of alcohol, discovering that the alcohol content of 2 litres of expired air was a little greater than that of 1 cc of urine. Also in 1927, a Chicago chemist, William Duncan McNally, invented a breathalyzer in which the breath moving through chemicals in water would change color. One suggested use for his invention was for housewives to test whether their husbands had been drinking. In December 1927, in a case in Marlborough, England, Dr. Gorsky, a police surgeon, asked a suspect to inflate a football bladder with his breath. Since the 2 liters of the man's breath contained 1.5 mg of ethanol, Gorsky testified before the court that the defendant was "50% drunk". The use of drunkenness as the standard, as opposed to BAC, perhaps invalidated the analysis, as tolerance to alcohol varies. However, the story illustrates the general principles of breath analysis.

In 1931 the first practical roadside breath-testing device was the drunkometer developed by Rolla Neil Harger of the Indiana University School of Medicine. The drunkometer collected a motorist's breath sample directly into a balloon inside the machine. The breath sample was then pumped through an acidified potassium permanganate solution. If there was alcohol in the breath sample, the solution changed color. The greater the color change, the more alcohol there was present in the breath. The drunkometer was manufactured and sold by Stephenson Corporation of Red Bank, New Jersey.

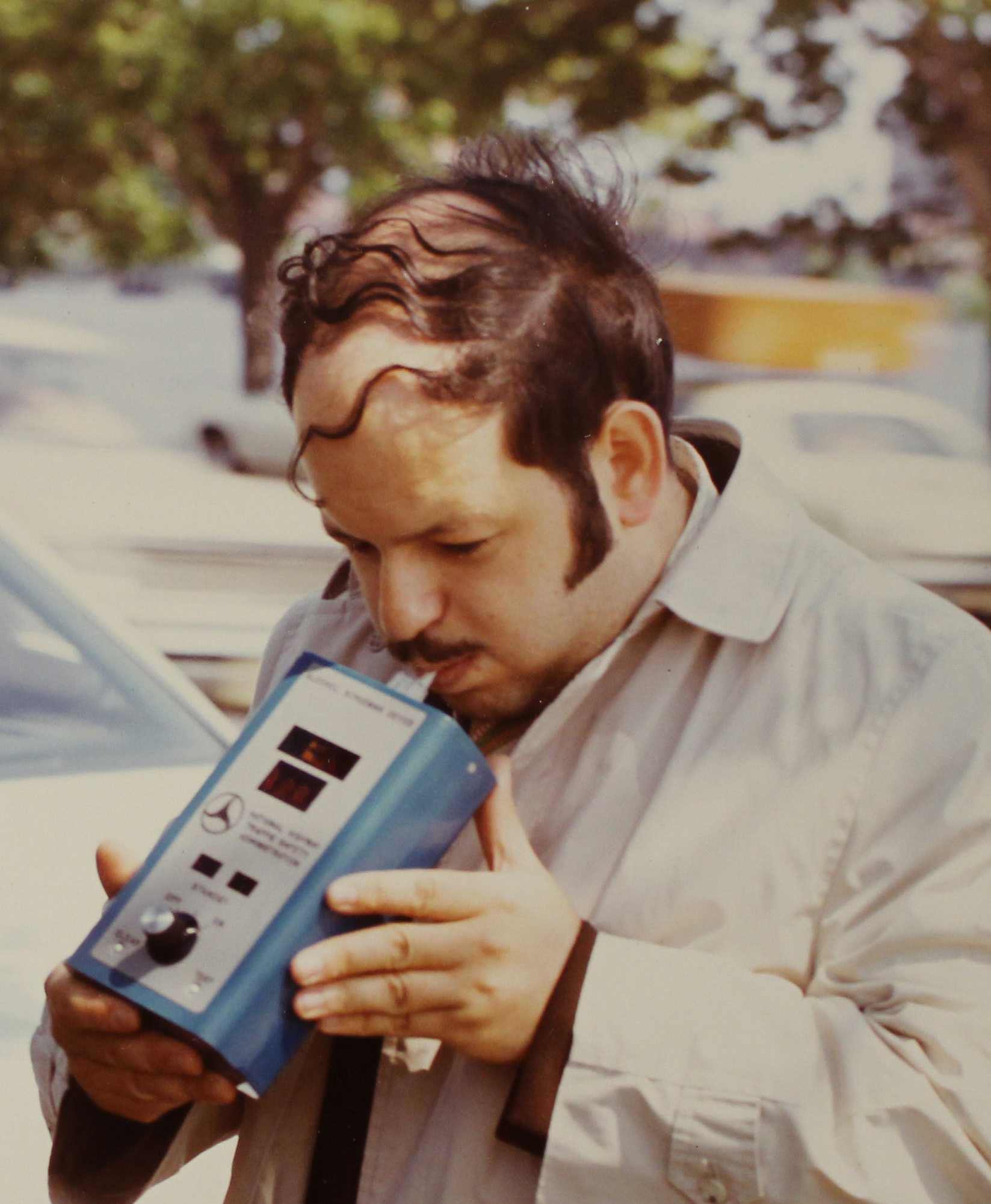
A US Transportation Systems Center staff member demonstrates a breathalyzer in 1972

In 1954 Robert Frank Borkenstein (1912–2002) was a captain with the Indiana State Police and later a professor at Indiana University Bloomington. His trademarked Breathalyzer used chemical oxidation and photometry to determine alcohol concentrations. The invention of the Breathalyzer provided law enforcement with a quick and portable test to determine an individual's intoxication level via breath analysis.

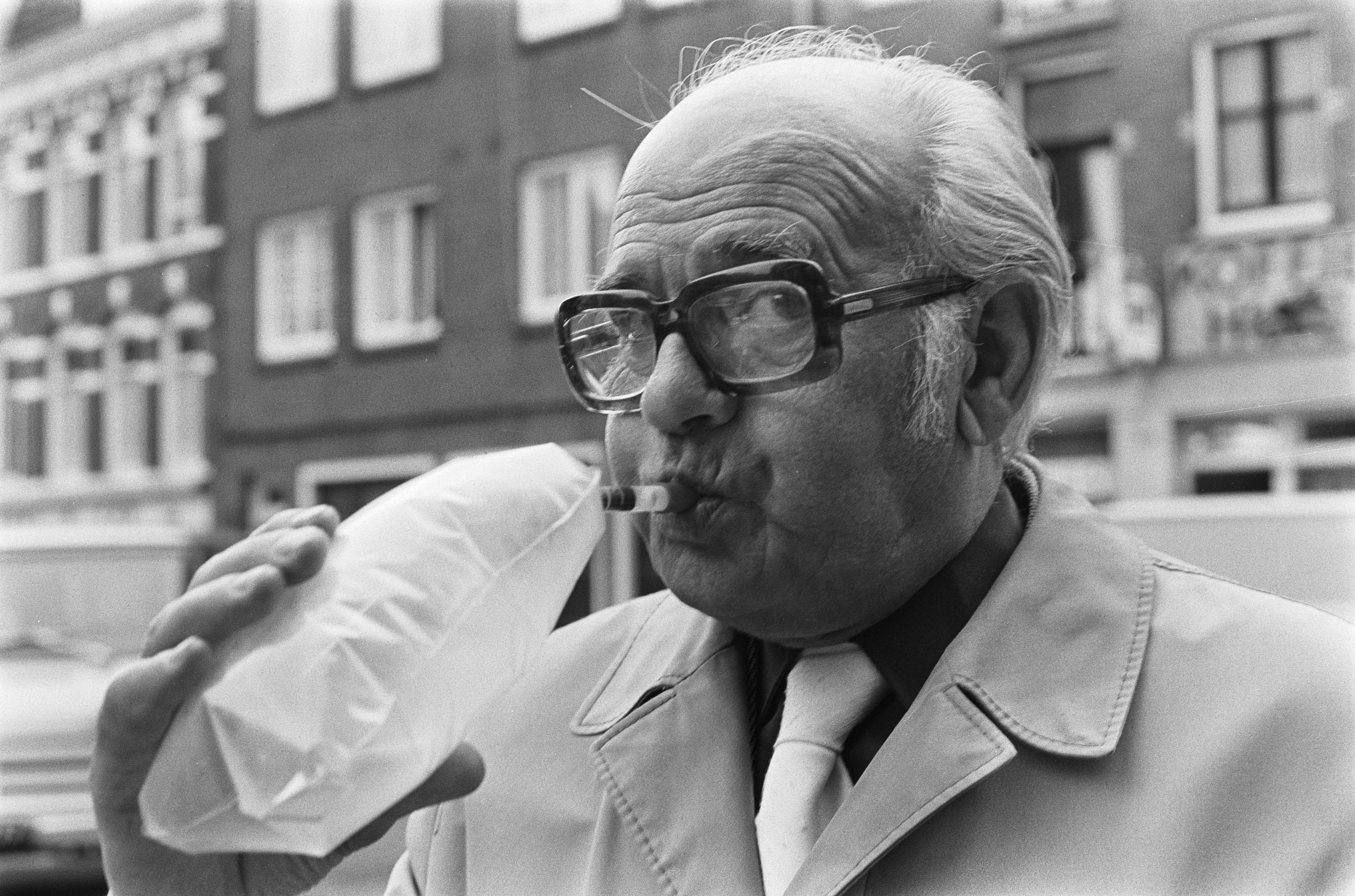
A man demonstrating a breathalyzer in the Netherlands in 1974

Subsequent breath analyzers have converted primarily to infrared spectroscopy. In 1967 in Britain, Bill Ducie and Tom Parry Jones developed and marketed the first electronic breathalyser. They established Lion Laboratories in Cardiff. Ducie was a chartered electrical engineer, and Parry Jones was a lecturer at UWIST. The Road Safety Act 1967 introduced the first legally enforceable maximum blood alcohol level for drivers in the UK, above which it became an offence to be in charge of a motor vehicle; and introduced the roadside breathalyser, made available to police forces across the country. In 1979, Lion Laboratories' version of the breathalyser, known as the Alcolyser and incorporating crystal-filled tubes that changed colour above a certain level of alcohol in the breath, was approved for police use. Lion Laboratories won the Queen's Award for Technological Achievement for the product in 1980, and it began to be marketed worldwide. The Alcolyser was superseded by the Lion Intoximeter 3000 in 1983, and later by the Lion Alcolmeter and Lion Intoxilyser. These later models used a fuel cell alcohol sensor rather than crystals, providing a more reliable roadside test and removing the need for blood or urine samples to be taken at a police station. In 1991, Lion Laboratories was sold to the American company MPD, Inc.

== Chemistry ==
There are a variety of mechanisms used in breathalyzers, for example oxidation with potassium permanganate, or infrared spectroscopy.

For an electrochemical electrolyzer, when the user exhales into a breath analyzer, any ethanol present in their breath is oxidized to acetic acid at the anode:

$\ce{C2H5OH_{(g)}{} + H2O_{(l)} -> CH3COOH_{(l)}{} + 4H+_{(aq)}{} + 4e-}$

at the cathode, atmospheric oxygen is reduced:

$\ce{O2_{(g)}{} + 4H+_{(aq)}{} + 4e- -> 2H2O_{(l)}}$

The overall reaction is the oxidation of ethanol to acetic acid and water.

$\ce{C2H5OH_{(l)}{} + O2_{(g)}{} -> CH3COOH_{(aq)}{} + H2O_{(l)}}$

The electric current produced by this reaction is measured by a computer, and displayed as an approximation of overall blood alcohol content (BAC) by the Alcosensor.

== Accuracy ==
Breath analyzers do not directly measure blood alcohol concentration (BAC), which requires the analysis of a blood sample. Instead, they measure the amount of alcohol in one's breath, BrAC, generally reported in milligrams of alcohol per liter of breathed air. The relationship between BrAC and BAC is complex, and is affected by many factors.

=== Calibration ===
Calibration is the process of checking and adjusting the internal settings of a breath analyzer by comparing and adjusting its test results to a known alcohol standard. Breath analyzer sensors drift over time and require periodic calibration to ensure accuracy. Many handheld breath analyzers sold to consumers use a silicon oxide sensor (also called a semiconductor sensor) to determine the alcohol concentration. These sensors are prone to contamination and interference from substances other than breath alcohol, and require recalibration or replacement every six months. Higher-end personal breath analyzers and professional-use breath alcohol testers use platinum fuel cell sensors. These too require recalibration but at less frequent intervals than semiconductor devices, usually once a year.

There are two ways of calibrating a precision fuel cell breath analyzer, the wet-bath and the dry-gas methods. Each method requires specialized equipment and factory-trained technicians. It is not a procedure that can be conducted by untrained users or without the proper equipment.

- The dry-gas method utilizes a portable calibration standard which is a precise mixture of ethanol and inert nitrogen available in a pressurized canister. Initial equipment costs are less than alternative methods and the steps required are fewer. The equipment is also portable allowing calibrations to be done when and where required.
- The wet-bath method utilizes an ethanol/water standard in a precise specialized alcohol concentration, contained and delivered in specialized breath simulator equipment. The wet-bath method has a higher initial cost and is not intended to be portable. The standard must be fresh and replaced regularly. In addition, the assumed water-air partition ratio for aqueous ethanol must be taken into account along with its associated uncertainty.

Some semiconductor models are designed specifically to allow the sensor module to be replaced without the need to send the unit to a calibration lab.

=== Non-specific analysis ===
One major problem with older breath analyzers is non-specificity: the machines identify not only the ethyl alcohol (or ethanol) found in alcoholic beverages but also other substances similar in molecular structure or reactivity, "interfering compounds".

The oldest breath analyzer models pass breath through a solution of potassium dichromate, which oxidizes ethanol into acetic acid, changing color in the process. A monochromatic light beam is passed through this sample, and a detector records the change in intensity and, hence, the change in color, which is used to calculate the percent alcohol in the breath. However, since potassium dichromate is a strong oxidizer, numerous alcohol groups can be oxidized by it, producing false positives. This source of false positives is unlikely as very few other substances found in exhaled air are oxidizable.

Infrared-based breath analyzers project an infrared beam of radiation through the captured breath in the sample chamber and detect the absorbance of the compound as a function of the wavelength of the beam, producing an absorbance spectrum that can be used to identify the compound, as the absorbance is due to the harmonic vibration and stretching of specific bonds in the molecule at specific wavelengths (see infrared spectroscopy). The characteristic bond of alcohols in infrared is the O-H bond, which gives a strong absorbance at a short wavelength. The more light is absorbed by compounds containing the alcohol group, the less reaches the detector on the other side—and the higher the reading. Other groups, most notably aromatic rings and carboxylic acids can give similar absorbance readings.

Some natural and volatile interfering compounds do exist, however. For example, the National Highway Traffic Safety Administration has found that dieters and diabetics may have acetone levels hundreds or even thousands of times higher than those in others. Acetone is one of the many substances that can be falsely identified as ethyl alcohol by some breath machines. However, fuel cell based systems are non-responsive to substances like acetone.

Substances in the environment can also lead to false BAC readings. For example, methyl tert-butyl ether, a common gasoline additive, has been alleged anecdotally to cause false positives in persons exposed to it. Tests have shown this to be true for older machines; however, newer machines detect this interference and compensate for it. Any number of other products found in the environment or workplace can also cause erroneous BAC results. These include compounds found in lacquer, paint remover, celluloid, gasoline, and cleaning fluids, especially ethers, alcohols, and other volatile compounds.

=== Pharmacokinetics ===
Absorption of alcohol continues for anywhere from 20 minutes (on an empty stomach) to two-and-one-half hours (on a full stomach) after the last consumption, generally taking around 40–50 minutes. During the absorptive phase, the concentration of alcohol throughout the body changes unpredictably, as it is affected by gastrointestinal physiology such as irregular contraction patterns. After absorption, the concentrations in the body settle down and follow predictable patterns. During absorption, the BAC in arterial blood will generally be higher than in venous blood, but post-absorption, venous BAC will be higher than arterial BAC. This is especially clear with bolus dosing, chugging a single large drink. With additional doses of alcohol, the definitions of absorption and post-absorption are less clear. However, once absorption of the last drink has finished, the concentrations will follow standard post-absorption curves. It is also not always clear from a BAC graph when the absorption phase finishes - for example, the body can reach a sustained equilibrium BAC where absorption and elimination are proportional.

Across all phases, BrAC correlates closely with arterial BAC. Arterial blood distributes oxygen throughout the body. Breath alcohol is a representation of the equilibrium of alcohol concentration as the blood gases (alcohol) pass from the arterial blood into the lungs to be expired in the breath. The ratio of ABAC:BrAC is 2294 ± 56 across all phases and 2251 ± 46 [2141-2307] in the post-absorption phase. For example, a breathalyzer measurement of 0.10 mg/L of breath alcohol characterises approximately 0.0001×2251 g/L, or 0.2251 g/L of arterial blood alcohol concentration (equivalent to 0.2251 permille or 0.02251% BAC).

The ratio of venous blood alcohol content to breath alcohol content may vary significantly, from 1300:1 to 3100:1. Assuming a blood-alcohol concentration of 0.07%, for example, a person could have a partition ratio of 1500:1 and a breath test reading of 0.10 g/2100 mL, over the legal limit in some jurisdictions. However, low partition ratios are generally observed during the absorption phase. Post-absorption, the ratio is relatively fixed, 2382 ± 119 [2125–2765], although this ratio was measured in a laboratory environment and variation may be larger in real-world scenarios.

Other false positives of high BrAC and also blood reading are related to patients with proteinuria and hematuria, due to kidney metabolization and failure. The metabolization rate of related patients with kidney damage is abnormal in relation to percent in alcohol in the breath. However, since potassium dichromate is a strong oxidizer, numerous alcohol groups can be oxidized by kidney and blood filtration, producing false positives.

=== Breathing pattern ===
It is sometimes said that the exhaled air analyzed by the breathalyzer is "alveolar air", coming from the alveoli in close proximity to the blood in pulmonary circulation and containing ethanol in concentrations proportional to that blood approximated by Henry's law. However, the alcohol in the exhaled air comes essentially from the airways of the lung, and not from the alveoli. The alcohol acts similarly to water vapor, so it is instructive to study the humidity of lung air. During breathing, the inspired air picks up water and alcohol from the airways. Almost all uptake occurs in the upper airways; thus, the BrAC is most affected by the alcohol concentration in the bronchial circulation, which supplies blood to these airways. When the air reaches the alveoli, it is already near equilibrium - this is why inhaling dry air does not dry out the lungs significantly. With exhalation, water and alcohol are rapidly lost to the airways, primarily within the fifth to fifteenth generations of branching. Nonetheless, as may be evidenced by seeing one's breath in the cold, some water vapor does not get re-absorbed by the airways and is exhaled, and similarly some alcohol is exhaled during breathing. But the relationship of the alcohol concentration of this air to the concentration of alcohol in the blood is somewhat suspect and can be affected by many variables.

As air is exhaled, the alcohol concentration of the exhaled air increases over time, rising significantly in the first few seconds and then slowing down after, but not leveling out until the subject stops exhaling. This is not because there is a "dead space" of non-alcoholic air in the airways - the alcohol concentration is nearly identical in all regions of the lung. Rather, it is because, during exhalation, water and alcohol are being redeposited on the airways, primarily the trachea and generations 6 though 12 of the airways. As more fluid is deposited on the mucous surfaces, the remaining fluid travels further, resulting in more alcohol being recorded by the breathalyzer. The recorded alcohol concentrations never reach the alveolar alcohol concentration, even if the subject exhales as deeply as possible. According to Henry's law, alveolar air alcohol concentration would be pulmonary BAC divided by 1756, compared to the BrAC which is arterial blood concentration divided by 2251. When the subject stops exhaling, the alcohol concentration levels off - this does not indicate that alveolar air has been obtained, as it will level off regardless of the point at which the subject stops exhaling. But it does mean that end-exhaled BrAC is readily obtained. This brings up the question of what is meant by reporting BrAC as a single number; is it the "deep-lung air", the highest possible reading obtainable by the subject's full exhalation? Or is it the zero concentration at the initial part of the curve? Hlastala suggests using the average BrAC during the exhalation, which corresponds to the BrAC measured at about the 5-second mark. The Supreme Court of California determined that the BrAC is defined as the alcohol concentration of the last part of the subject's expired breath.

End-exhaled BrAC varies depending on several factors. Most alcohol breath testers require a minimum exhalation volume (normally between 1.1 and 1.5 L) or minimum six-second exhalation time before the breath sample is accepted. This raises concerns for subject with smaller lung volumes - they must exhale a greater fraction of their available lung volume compared with a larger subject. A mathematical model suggests that a 2L-lung-capacity subject's end-exhaled BrAC may read 35% higher than a 6L subject for the same minimum 1.5L exhalation and alveolar alcohol concentration. For exhalation to the maximum extent, such as under typical laboratory conditions, measured BrAC is unaffected by lung size. The subject's body temperature and breath temperature also influence results, with an increase in temperature corresponding to an increase in measured BrAC. Furthermore, the humidity and temperature of the ambient air can decrease results by as much as 10%. The result of these factors is that the breath test is more forgiving for some subjects than others. Nonetheless, the overall variance due to how much one breathes out is usually low, and some breathalyzers compensate for the volume of air.

Jones tested several breathing patterns immediately before and during breathalyzer use and found the following changes (in order of effect):

- Hyperventilation by rapid inspiration and expiration of room air for 20 seconds before forced expiration - decrease by 10%
- Moderate inspiration through mouth and deep expiration - control
- Deep expiration without an inspiration - statistically insignificant increase
- Inspiration through the nose before a deep expiration. - 1.3% increase
- Deep inspiration followed by a slow (20 second) expiration. - 2.0% increase
- Mouth closed for 5 minutes (shallow breathing) before nose-inspiration and a forced expiration. - 7.7% increase
- Inspiration through the nose followed by breath-holding for 30 seconds before forced expiration. - 12.6% increase
- A normal inspiration with breath-holding for 30 seconds before a forced expiration. - 15.7% increase

Overall, the results show an increase in measured BrAC with increased contact between the lungs and the measured air. Exercising immediately before the test, such as running up and down a flight of stairs, can also reduce measured BrAC by 13% or more, with the combined effect of exercise and hyperventilation reaching 20%.

=== Mouth alcohol ===
One of the most common causes of falsely high breath analyzer readings is the existence of mouth alcohol. In analyzing a subject's breath sample, the breath analyzer's internal computer is making the assumption that the alcohol in the breath sample came from the lungs. However, alcohol may have come from the mouth, throat or stomach for a number of reasons. A very tiny amount of alcohol from the mouth, throat or stomach can have a significant impact on the breath-alcohol reading.

Recent use of mouthwash or breath fresheners can also skew results upward, as they can contain fairly high levels of alcohol. Listerine mouthwash, for example, contains 26.9% alcohol, and can skew results for between 5 and 10 minutes. A scientist tested the effects of Binaca breath spray on an Intoxilyzer 5000. He performed 23 tests with subjects who sprayed their throats and obtained readings as high as 0.81—far beyond legal levels. The scientist also noted that the effects of the spray did not fall below detectable levels until after 18 minutes.

Other than those, the most common source of mouth alcohol is from belching or burping. This causes the liquids and/or gases from the stomach—including any alcohol—to rise up into the soft tissue of the esophagus and oral cavity, where it will stay until it has dissipated. The American Medical Association concludes in its Manual for Chemical Tests for Intoxication (1959): "True reactions with alcohol in expired breath from sources other than the alveolar air (eructation, regurgitation, vomiting) will, of course, vitiate the breath alcohol results." Acid reflux, or gastroesophageal reflux disease, can greatly exacerbate the mouth-alcohol problem. The stomach is normally separated from the throat by a valve, but when this valve becomes incompetent or herniated, there is nothing to stop the liquid contents in the stomach from rising and permeating the esophagus and mouth. The contents—including any alcohol—are then later exhaled into the breathalyzer. One study of 10 individuals suffering from this condition did not find any actual increase in breath ethanol.

Mouth alcohol can also be created in other ways. Dentures, some have theorized, will trap alcohol, although experiments have shown no difference if the normal 15 minute observation period is observed. Periodontal disease can also create pockets in the gums which will contain the alcohol for longer periods. Also known to produce false results due to residual alcohol in the mouth is passionate kissing with an intoxicated person.

To help guard against mouth-alcohol contamination, certified breath-test operators and police officers are trained to observe a test subject carefully for at least 15–20 minutes before administering the breath test. Some instruments also feature built-in safeguards. The Intoxilyzer 5000 features a "slope" parameter. This parameter detects any decrease in alcohol concentration of 0.006 g per 210 L of breath in 0.6 second, a condition indicative of residual mouth alcohol, and will result in an "invalid sample" warning to the operator, notifying the operator of the presence of the residual mouth alcohol. Other instruments require that the individual be tested twice at least two minutes apart. Mouthwash or other mouth alcohol will have somewhat dissipated after two minutes and cause the second reading to disagree with the first, requiring a retest. Many preliminary breath testers, however, feature no such safeguards.

=== Myths about accuracy ===
There are a number of substances or techniques that can supposedly "fool" a breath analyzer (i.e., generate a lower blood alcohol content).

A 2003 episode of the science television show MythBusters tested a number of methods that supposedly allow a person to fool a breath analyzer test. The methods tested included breath mints, onions, denture cream, mouthwash, pennies and batteries; all of these methods proved ineffective. The show noted that using these items to cover the smell of alcohol may fool a person, but, since they will not actually reduce a person's BrAC, there will be no effect on a breath analyzer test regardless of the quantity used, if any, it appeared that using mouthwash only raised the BrAC. Pennies supposedly produce a chemical reaction, while batteries supposedly create an electrical charge, yet neither of these methods affected the breath analyzer results.

The MythBusters episode also pointed out another complication: it would be necessary to insert the item into one's mouth (for example, eat an onion, rinse with mouthwash, conceal a battery), take the breath test, and then possibly remove the item — all of which would have to be accomplished discreetly enough to avoid alerting the police officers administering the test (who would obviously become very suspicious if they noticed that a person was inserting items into their mouth prior to taking a breath test). It would likely be very difficult, especially for someone in an intoxicated state, to be able to accomplish such a feat.

In addition, the show noted that breath tests are often verified with blood tests (BAC, which are more accurate) and that even if a person somehow managed to fool a breath test, a blood test would certainly confirm a person's guilt.

Other substances that might reduce the BrAC reading include a bag of activated charcoal concealed in the mouth (to absorb alcohol vapor), an oxidizing gas (such as N_{2}O, Cl_{2}, O_{3}, etc.) that would fool a fuel cell type detector, or an organic interferent to fool an infrared absorption detector. The infrared absorption detector is more vulnerable to interference than a laboratory instrument measuring a continuous absorption spectrum since it only makes measurements at particular discrete wavelengths. However, due to the fact that any interference can only cause higher absorption, not lower, the estimated blood alcohol content will be overestimated. Additionally, Cl_{2} is toxic and corrosive.

A 2007 episode of the Spike network's show Manswers showed some of the more common and not-so-common ways of attempts to beat the breath analyzer, none of which work. Test 1 was to suck on a copper-coated coin such as a penny. Test 2 was to hold a battery on the tongue. Test 3 was to chew gum. None of these tests showed a "pass" reading if the subject had consumed alcohol.

== Law enforcement ==
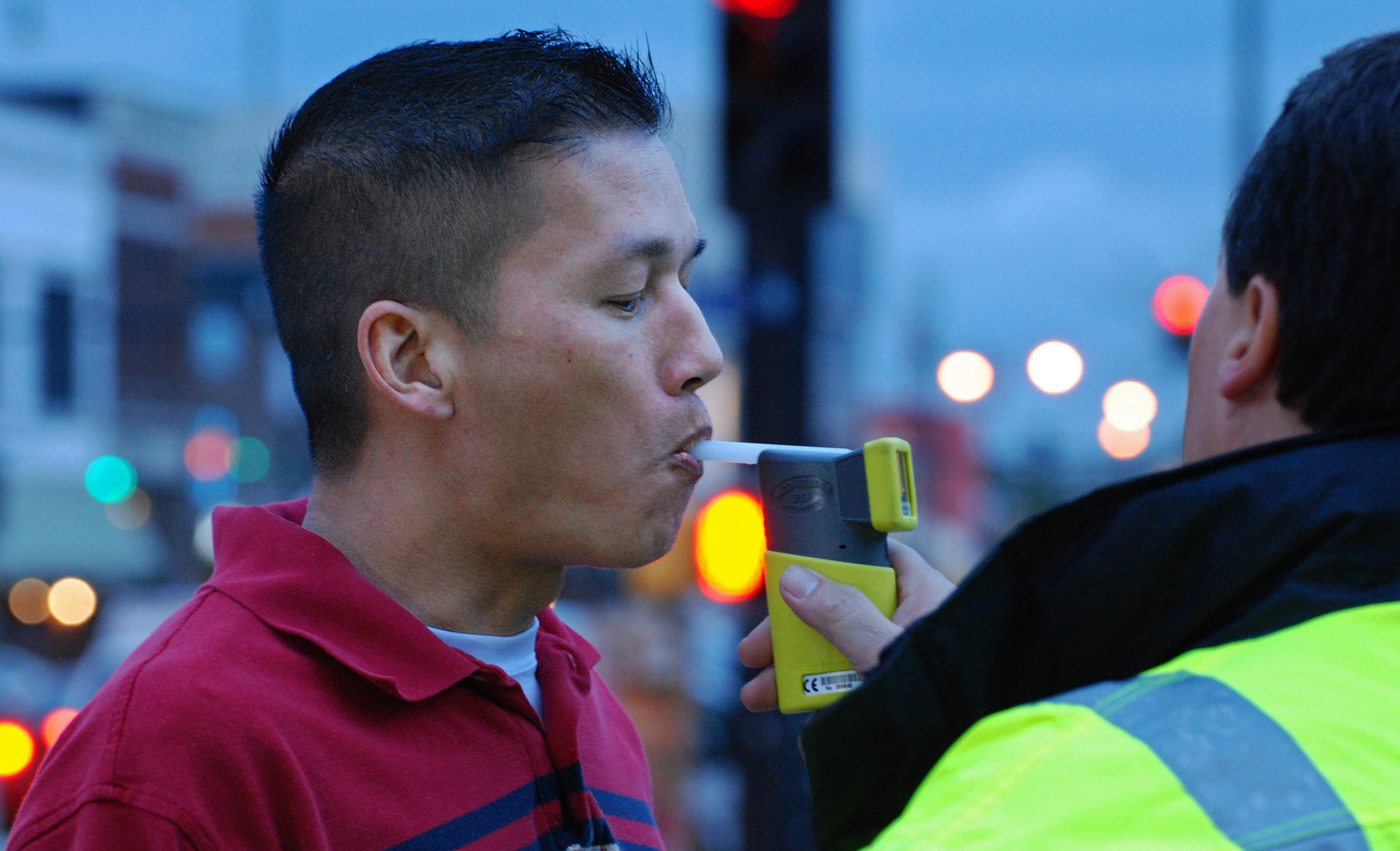
A police officer testing a volunteer's blood alcohol level

In general, two types of breathalyzers are used. Small hand-held breathalyzers are not reliable enough to provide evidence in court but reliable enough to justify an arrest. These devices may be used by officers in the field as a form of "field sobriety test" commonly called "preliminary breath test" or "preliminary alcohol screening", or as evidential devices in point of arrest testing. Larger breathalyzer devices found in police stations can be used to produce court evidence. These desktop analyzers generally use infrared spectrophotometer technology, electrochemical fuel cell technology, or a combination of the two.

All breath alcohol testers used by law enforcement in the United States of America must be approved by the Department of Transportation's National Highway Traffic Safety Administration.

=== Breath alcohol laws ===
The breath alcohol content reading may be used in prosecutions of the crime of driving under the influence of alcohol (sometimes referred to as driving or operating while intoxicated) in several ways. Historically, states in the US initially prohibited driving with a high level of BAC, and did not have any laws regarding BrAC. A BrAC test result was merely presented as indirect evidence of BAC. Where the defendant had refused to take a subsequent blood test, the only way the state could prove BAC was by presenting scientific evidence of how alcohol in the breath gets there from alcohol in the blood, along with evidence of how to convert from one to the other. DUI defense attorneys frequently contested the scientific reliability of such evidence. Before September 2011, South Dakota relied solely on blood tests to ensure accuracy.

States responded in different ways to the inability to rely on breathalyzer evidence. Many states such as California modified their statutes so to make a certain level of alcohol in the breath illegal per se. In other words, the BrAC level itself became the direct predicate evidence for conviction, with no need to estimate BAC. In per se jurisdictions such as the UK, it is automatically illegal to drive a vehicle with a sufficiently high breath alcohol concentration (BrAC). The breath analyzer reading of the operator will be offered as evidence of that crime, and challenges can only be offered on the basis of an inaccurate reading.

In other states, such as California and New Jersey, the statute remains tied to BAC, but the BrAC results of certain machines have been judicially deemed presumptively accurate substitutes for blood testing when used as directed. While BrAC tests are not necessary to prove a defendant was under the influence, laws in these states create a rebuttable presumption, which means it is presumed that the driver was intoxicated given a high BrAC reading, but that presumption can be rebutted if a jury finds it unreliable or if other evidence establishes a reasonable doubt as to whether the person actually drove with a breath or blood alcohol level of 0.08% or greater.

Another issue is that the BrAC is typically tested several hours after the time of driving. Some jurisdictions, such as the State of Washington, allow the use of breath analyzer test results without regard as to how much time passed between operation of the vehicle and the time the test was administered, or within a certain number of hours of testing. Other jurisdictions use retrograde extrapolation to estimate the BAC or BrAC at the time of driving.

One exception to criminal prosecution is the state of Wisconsin, where a first time drunk driving offense is normally a civil ordinance violation.

=== Breath levels ===
There is no international consensus on the statutory ratio of blood to breath levels, ranging from 2000:1 (most of Europe) to 2100:1 (US) to 2300:1 (UK). In the US, the ratio of 2100:1 was determined based on studies done in 1930–1950, with a 1952 report of the National Safety Council establishing the 2100:1 figure. The NSC has acknowledged that more recent research shows the actual relationship is most probably higher than 2100:1 and closer to 2300:1, but opines that this difference is of minimal practical significance in law enforcement. The use of the lower 2100:1 factor errs on the side of conservativism and can only favor the driver.

In early years, the range of the BrAC threshold in the US varied considerably between States. States have since adopted a uniform 0.08% BrAC level, due to federal guidelines. It is said that the federal government ensures the passage of the federal guidelines by tying traffic safety highway funds to compliance with federal guidelines on certain issues, such as the federal government ensuring that the legal drinking age be the age of 21 across the 50 states.

Police in Victoria, Australia, use breathalyzers that give a recognized 20% tolerance on readings. Noel Ashby, former Victoria Police Assistant Commissioner (Traffic & Transport), claims that this tolerance is to allow for different body types.

=== Preliminary breath tests ===
The preliminary breath test or preliminary alcohol screening test uses small hand-held breath analyzers (hand-held breathalyzers). (The terms "preliminary breath test" ("PBT") and "preliminary alcohol screening test" reference the same devices and functions.) They are generally based on electrochemical platinum fuel cell analysis. These units are similar to some evidentiary breathalyzers, but typically are not calibrated frequently enough for evidentiary purposes. The test device typically provides numerical blood alcohol content (BAC) readings, but its primary use is for screening. In some cases, the device even has "pass/fail" indicia. For example, in Canada, PST devices, called "alcohol screening devices" are set so that, from 0 to 49 mg% it shows digits, from 50 to 99 mg% it shows the word "warn" and 100 mg% and above it shows "fail". These preliminary breath tests are sometimes categorised as part of field sobriety testing, although it is not part of the series of performance tests generally associated with field sobriety tests (FSTs) or standard field sobriety tests (SFSTs).

In Canada, a preliminary non-evidentiary screening device can be approved by Parliament as an approved screening device. In order to demand a person produce a breathalyzer sample an officer must have "reasonable suspicion" that the person drove with more than 80 mg alcohol per 100 mL of blood. The demand must be within three hours of driving. Any driver that refuses can be charged under s.254 of the Criminal Code. With the legalization of cannabis, updates to the criminal code are proposed that will allow a breathalyzer test to be administered without suspicion of impairment.

The US National Highway Traffic Safety Administration maintains a Conforming Products List of breath alcohol devices approved for preliminary screening use. In the United States, the main use of the preliminary breath test (PBT) is to establish probable cause for arrest. All states have implied consent laws, which means that by applying for a driver's license, drivers are agreeing to take an evidentiary chemical test (blood, breath, or urine) after being arrested for a DUI. But in US law, the arrest and subsequent test may be invalidated if it is found that the arrest lacked probable cause. The PBT establishes a baseline alcohol level that the police officer may use to justify the arrest. The result of the PBT is not generally admissible in court, except to establish probable cause, although some states, such as Idaho, permit data or "readings" from hand-held preliminary breath testers or preliminary alcohol screeners to be presented as evidence in court. In states such as Florida and Colorado, there are no penalties for refusing a PBT. Police are not obliged to advise the suspect that participation in a FST, PBT, or other pre-arrest procedures is voluntary. In contrast, formal evidentiary tests given under implied consent requirements are considered mandatory.

Refusal to take a preliminary breath test in the State of Michigan subjects a non-commercial driver to a "civil infraction" fine, with no violation "points", but is not considered to be a refusal under the general "implied consent" law. In some states, the state may present evidence of refusal to take a field sobriety test in court, although this is of questionable probative value in a drunk driving prosecution.

Different requirements apply in many states to drivers under DUI probation, in which case participation in a preliminary breath test may be a condition of probation, and for commercial drivers under "drug screening" requirements. Some US states, notably California, have statutes on the books penalizing preliminary breath test refusal for drivers under 21; however the Constitutionality of those statutes has not been tested. (As a practical matter, most criminal lawyers advise suspects who refuse a preliminary breath test or preliminary alcohol screening to not engage in discussion or "justifying" the refusal with the police.)

=== Evidentiary breath tests ===
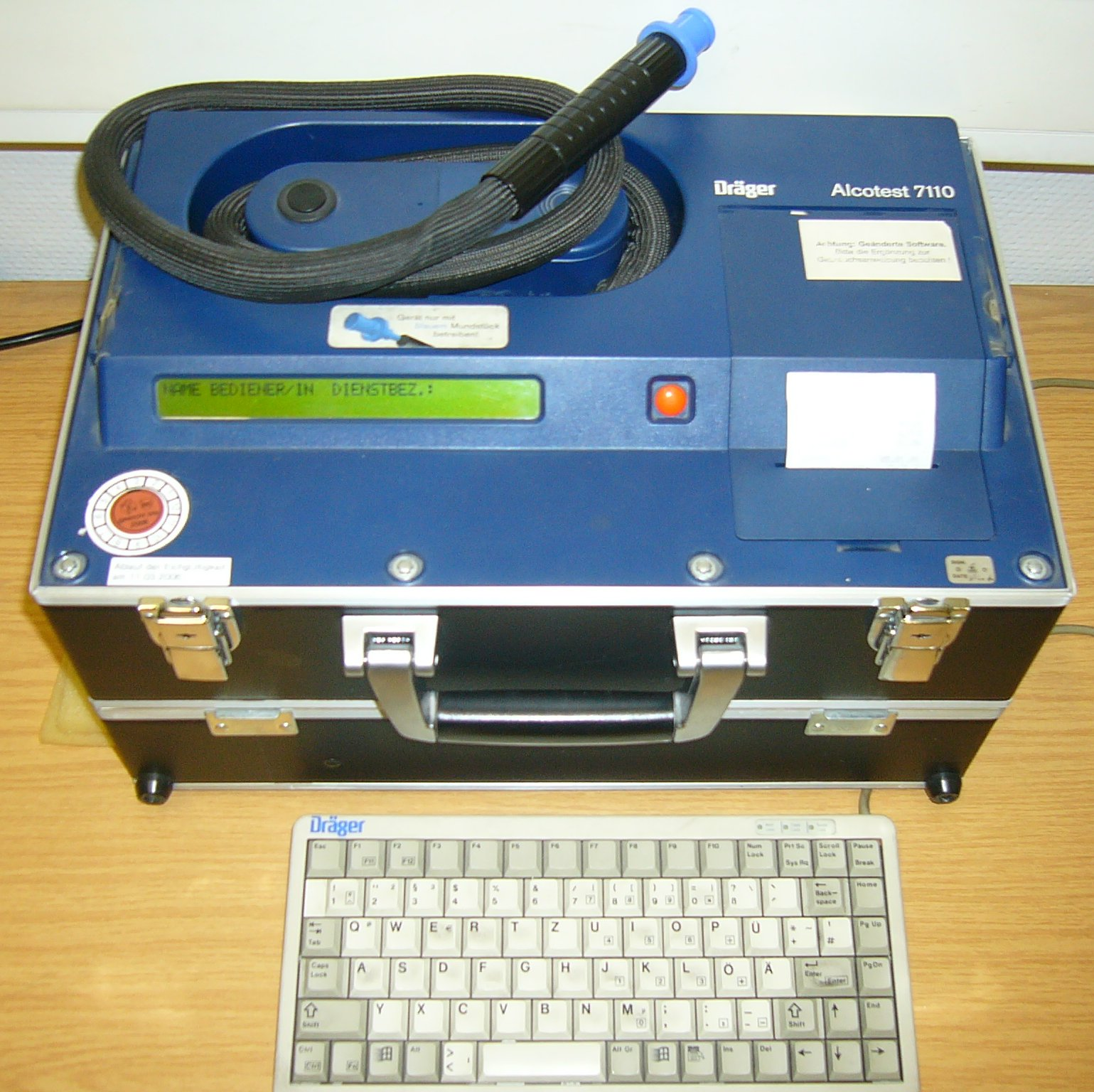
An evidential breath tester

In Canada, an evidentiary breath instrument can be designated as an approved instrument. The US National Highway Traffic Safety Administration maintains a Conforming Products List of breath alcohol devices approved for evidentiary use, Infrared instruments are also known as "evidentiary breath testers" and generally produce court-admissible results.

=== Drinking after driving ===
A common defense to an impaired driving charge (in appropriate circumstances) is that the consumption of alcohol occurred subsequent to driving. The typical circumstance where this comes up is when a driver consumes alcohol after a road accident, as an affirmative defense. This closely relates to absorptive stage intoxication (or bolus drinking), except that the consumption of alcohol also occurred after driving. This defense can be overcome by retrograde extrapolation (infra), but complicates prosecution.

While jurisdictions that recognise absorptive stage intoxication as a defense would also accept a defense of consumption after driving, some jurisdictions penalise post-driving drinking. In Canada, it is illegal to be over the impaired driving limits within 3 hours of driving (given as 2 hours by CDN DOJ); however, the new law allows a "drinking after driving" defence in a situation where a driver had no reason to expect a demand by the police for breath testing. South Africa is more straightforward, with a separate penalty applied for consumption "After An Accident" until reported to the police and if so required, has been medically examined.

=== Retrograde extrapolation ===
The breath analyzer test is usually administered at a police station, commonly an hour or more after the arrest. Although this gives the BrAC at the time of the test, it does not by itself answer the question of what it was at the time of driving. The prosecution typically provides an estimated alcohol concentration at the time of driving utilizing retrograde extrapolation, presented by expert opinion. This involves projecting back in time to estimate the BrAC level at the time of driving, by applying the physiological properties of absorption and elimination rates in the human body.

Extrapolation is calculated using five factors and a general elimination rate of 0.015/hour.

Example
Time of breath test-10:00pm...Result of breath test-0.080...Time of driving-9:00pm (stopped by officer)...Time of last drink-8:00pm...Last food-12:00pm. Using these facts, an expert can say the person's last drink was consumed on an empty stomach, which means absorption of the last drink (at 8:00) was complete within one hour-9:00. At the time of the stop, the driver is fully absorbed. The test result of 0.080 was at 10:00. So the one hour of elimination that has occurred since the stop is added in, making 0.080+0.015=0.095 the approximate breath alcohol concentration at the time of the stop.

== Consumer use ==
Public breathalyzers are becoming a method for consumers to test themselves at the source of alcohol consumption. These are used in pubs, bars, restaurants, charities, weddings and all types of licensed events. As breathalyzer tests have increased risk of transmission of coronavirus, they were temporarily suspended from use in Sweden.

== Breathalyzer sensors ==
=== Non-alcoholic substances that can be detected by a breathalyzer ===
Breathalyzers are designed to pick up ethanol (the type of alcohol in drinks), but they can also mistake other substances for it, such as:

- Acetone (from keto diets or diabetes)
- Methanol or isopropanol exposure
- Some mouth sprays or breath fresheners.

Photovoltaic assay
The photovoltaic assay, used only in the dated photoelectric intoximeter, is a form of breath testing rarely encountered today. The process works by using photocells to analyze the color change of a redox (oxidation-reduction) reaction. A breath sample is bubbled through an aqueous solution of sulfuric acid, potassium dichromate, and silver nitrate. The silver nitrate acts as a catalyst, allowing the alcohol to be oxidized at an appreciable rate. The requisite acidic condition needed for the reaction might also be provided by the sulfuric acid. In solution, ethanol reacts with the potassium dichromate, reducing the dichromate ion to the chromium (III) ion. This reduction results in a change of the solution's color from red-orange to green. The reacted solution is compared to a vial of non-reacted solution by a photocell, which creates an electric current proportional to the degree of the color change; this current moves the needle that indicates BAC. Like other methods, breath testing devices using chemical analysis are prone to false readings. Compounds that have compositions similar to ethanol, for example, could also act as reducing agents, creating the necessary color change to indicate increased BAC.

Infrared spectroscopy
Infrared breathalyzers allow a high degree of specificity for ethanol. Typically, evidential breath alcohol instruments in police stations will work on the principle of infrared spectroscopy.

Fuel cell
Fuel cell gas sensors are based on the oxidation of ethanol to acetaldehyde on an electrode. The current produced is proportional to the amount of alcohol present. These sensors are very stable, typically requiring calibration every 6 months, and are the type of sensor usually found in roadside breath testing devices.

Semiconductor
Semiconductor gas sensors are based on the increase in conductance of a tin oxide layer in the presence of a reducing gas such as vaporized ethanol. They are found in inexpensive breathalyzers and their stability is not as reliable as fuel cell instruments.

== See also ==
- Coronavirus breathalyzer
