= Robert Frank Borkenstein =

American inventor and academic

- Born: August 31, 1912; Fort Wayne, Indiana, U.S.
- Died: August 10, 2002 (aged 89); Bloomington, Indiana, U.S.
- Occupations: Inventor, professor, and researcher
- Employer: Indiana State Police
- Known for: Inventor of the Breathalyzer

Robert Frank Borkenstein (August 31, 1912 – August 10, 2002) was an American inventor, researcher, and professor. He is best known for inventing the breathalyzer, a device that is used to detect a person's alcohol content from their breath.

== Early years ==
Robert F. Borkenstein was born in Fort Wayne, Indiana, on August 31, 1912. He graduated high school during the beginning of the Great Depression, and due to other financial issues and constraints he was unable to continue his education in college. He would find employment working in Fort Wayne as a photographic technician, where he developed an expertise in color film leading to his invention of a camera and replication of the Technicolor process for home use.

In 1936, because of his skills and creativity Borkenstein was hired by the Indiana State Police Criminology Laboratory. Rising through the ranks quickly, Borkenstein went from working as a clerk to captain in charge of Laboratory Services. Throughout his time with the Indiana State Police, he helped improve the use of photography in law enforcement and assisted in the creation of the polygraph machine.

== The Breathalyzer ==
While working with the Indiana State Police, Borkenstein developed a close professional relationship with Professor Rolla N. Harger of the Indiana University School of Medicine. Hager was working to develop the Drunkometer, which would be the first practical instrument of breath alcohol analysis when it was created in 1938. The Drunkometer required subjects to exhale into a balloon, which was brought to a lab for testing. Borkenstein continued develop a device that was less unreliable and time intensive.

In 1954, he created what is commonly known as the Breathalyzer. This version was a more compact, and easier to operate breath test machine, which produced reliable results concerning blood alcohol content. A revolutionary invention that aided the ability of traffic enforcement officials’ to identify and prosecute drivers under the influence of alcohol. The breathalyzer was commercially produced and adopted in law enforcement agencies throughout the country and world.

== Indiana University ==
During the 1950s, Borkenstein attended Indiana University on a part-time basis, earning his Bachelor of Arts in Forensic Science in 1958. During the same year as his graduation from IU, he retired from the Indiana State Police and joined the university faculty as Chairman of the Department of Police Administration, a newly established department. A unique program during its time, that also continued to develop during the Borkenstein's tenure. In 1971, Borkenstein became the director of the IU Center for Studies of Law in Action, which went on to offer a reoccurring "Robert F. Borkenstein Course on Alcohol and Highway Safety: Testing, Research, and Litigation" for forensic science, law enforcement, and criminal justice professionals. In March 1987 Borkenstein retired, though he continued to hold emeritus titles as both a professor and Director of the Center for Studies of Law in Action.

== Research ==
Borkenstein was an avid researcher and was very respected in his field. One of his most significant research endeavors was the Grand Rapids Study of 1962–1963, the findings of which supported changing the legal blood alcohol content from 0.1 to 0.08. In light of his achievements, Borkenstein was awarded an Honorary Doctor of Science by Wittenberg University in 1963 and an Honorary LL.D. from Indiana University in 1987. Borkenstein was inducted into the Safety and Health Hall of Fame International in 1988.

== Personal life ==
In 1938, Borkenstein married Marjorie K. Buchanan, a children's book author. The couple had no children. Borkenstein was a Francophile and the couple traveled extensively. His other interests included literature and Gilbert and Sullivan, and he had a reputation for being a knowledgeable bartender with unusual wine and liquor preferences.

Marjorie died in December 1998. Borkenstein died on August 10, 2002, at the age of 89.

== See also ==
- Field sobriety testing
