= Rolla Neil Harger =

American biochemist (1890–1983)

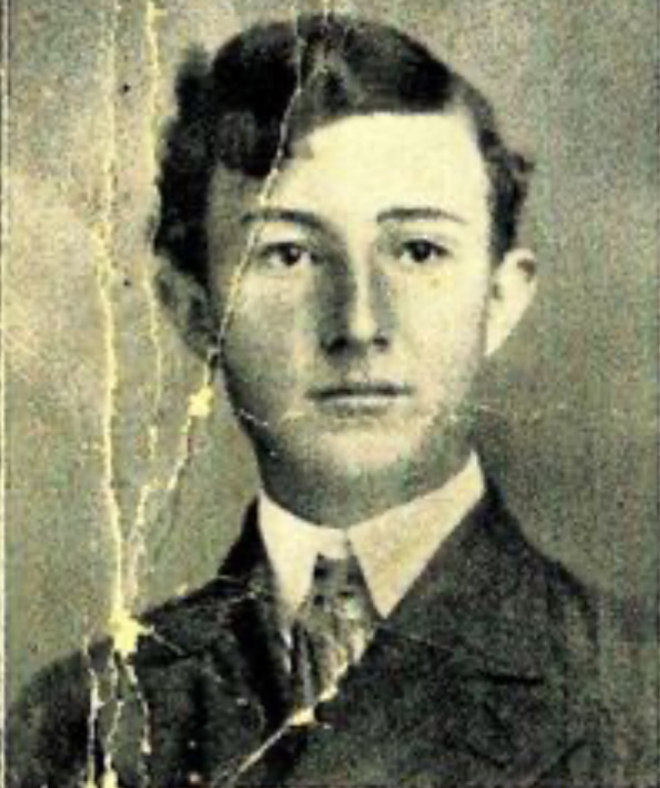
Harger in 1907

Rolla Neil Harger (January 14, 1890 – August 8, 1983) was an American biochemist. He invented an early breathalyzer, called the Drunkometer, to test for driving under the influence in 1931; he was awarded the patent in 1936. He was biochemistry and pharmacology department chairman of the Indiana University School of Medicine from 1933 to 1956 and worked as a professor in the department of biochemistry and toxicology from 1922 to 1960.

== Biography ==
Harger was born on January 14, 1890, in Sherman Township, Decatur County, Nebraska. He used Nebraska on his World War I draft registration and Decatur County, Kansas on his World War II draft registration. He graduated from Yale University in 1922.

Harger was an assistant professor at Indiana University School of Medicine in the newly formed department of biochemistry and pharmacology.

In 1931, he invented the Drunkometer to test for driving under the influence. In 1938, he was one of the five people chosen to be on the subcommittee of the National Safety Council that drafted the model legislation that set the blood alcohol content for driving under the influence.

Dr. Harger died on August 8, 1983, in Indianapolis, Indiana. He is buried in Crown Hill Cemetery.
