= Nathan Harger =

American photographer

- Occupation: Photographer

Nathan Harger is a photographer based in New York City.

== Studies ==
Harger received his B.F.A. in photography, with a minor in video, from the Cleveland Institute of Art. He went on to receive his MFA in photography and related technologies at Parsons the New School for Design in 2008.

== Photography career ==
His exhibition debut in New York City was the critically acclaimed exhibition, “Contradictions in Black and White”, an exhibition that placed his work alongside Irving Penn, Margaret Bourke-White, Walker Evans and Ray K. Metzker in 2009. His work has consistently been featured in several publications including New York Magazine.

Harger has been honored as one of Photo District News "30 Under 30," a list of "emerging photographers worth watching," and has been nominated for the 2009 Santa Fe Prize for photography and the 2010 Prix Pictet. His images were also included in American Photograph's portfolio of "Images of the Year" for 2008 and Wallpaper Magazine's "Photo Graduate Directory of 2009". He was recently included in Aperture Gallery's exhibition "States of Flux" and had his first solo gallery exhibition at Hasted Kraeutler in December 2010 - January 2011. His photographs have been acquired by the Cleveland Museum of Art and numerous important collections.
