= Field sobriety testing =

Battery of tests used by police officers

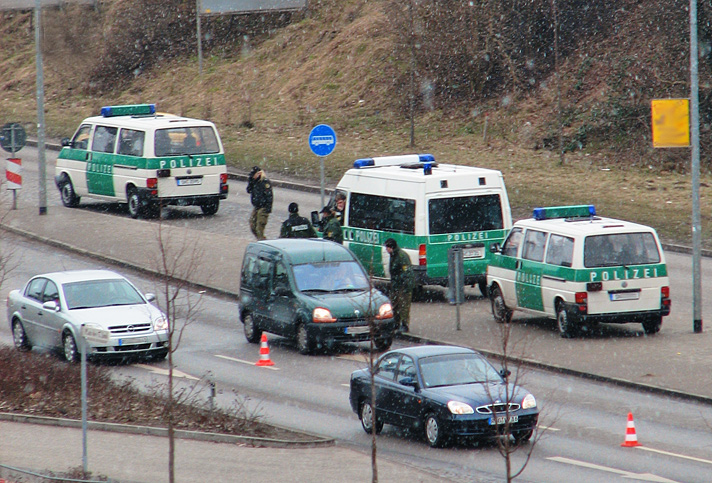
Sobriety checkpoint in Stralsund, Germany

Field sobriety tests (FSTs), also referred to as standardized field sobriety tests (SFSTs), are a battery of tests used by police officers to determine if a person suspected of impaired driving is intoxicated with alcohol or other drugs. FSTs (and SFSTs) are primarily used in the United States and Canada, to meet "probable cause for arrest" requirements (or the equivalent in either country), necessary to sustain an alcohol-impaired driving (DWI or DUI) conviction based on a chemical blood alcohol test.

== Background ==
=== Impaired driving ===
Impaired driving, referred to among other terms as driving under the influence (DUI) or driving while intoxicated (DWI), is the crime of driving a motor vehicle while impaired by alcohol or other drugs (including recreational drugs and those prescribed by physicians), to a level that renders the driver incapable of operating a motor vehicle safely.

Driving under the influence is a significant cause of traffic accidents. The US National Highway Traffic Safety Administration (NHTSA) found that, between 2014–2023, approximately 11,000 Americans were killed each year in alcohol-related accidents, representing nearly 30% of traffic fatalities in the United States. The Centers for Disease Control and Prevention estimated the monetary cost of alcohol-related traffic fatalities in the United States (including medical costs and the actuarial value of lives lost) as more than $120 billion in 2020. DUI is similarly one of the main causes of mortality for people in Europe aged 15–29.

With alcohol, a drunk driver's level of intoxication is typically determined by a measurement of blood alcohol content or BAC; but this can also be expressed as a breath test measurement, often referred to as a BrAC. A measurement in excess of the specific threshold level, such as 0.08%, defines the criminal offense with no need to prove impairment. In some jurisdictions, there is an aggravated category of the offense at a higher level, such as 0.12%, 0.15% or 0.20%. In many jurisdictions, police officers can conduct field tests of suspects to look for signs of intoxication. The US state of Colorado has a maximum blood content of THC for drivers who have consumed cannabis.

In most countries, driver's license suspensions, fines and prison sentences for DUI offenders are used as a deterrent. Anyone who is convicted of driving while under the influence of alcohol or other drugs can be heavily fined and/or given a prison sentence. In some jurisdictions, impaired drivers who injure or kill another person while driving may face heavier penalties. In addition, many countries have prevention campaigns that use advertising to make people aware of the danger of driving while impaired and the potential fines and criminal charges, discourage impaired driving, and encourage drivers to take taxis or public transport home after using alcohol or drugs. In some jurisdictions, the bar that served an impaired driver may face civil liability. In some countries, non-profit advocacy organizations, a well-known example being Mothers Against Drunk Driving (MADD), run their own publicity campaigns against drunk driving.

=== History ===
In the United States, drunk driving laws were enacted as early as 1906. However, prior to the early 1980s, drunk driving was regarded as a "folk crime", routinely committed by both good and bad citizens alike, and the crime was rarely prosecuted successfully. The NHTSA was formed in 1970. In the early 1970s, Marcelline Burns was writing her Ph.D. thesis in psychology, in California, and she was guided to the idea of researching sobriety tests by Herb Moskowitz, her psychology thesis review professor. The NHTSA had issued several requests for proposals (RFPs). Burns submitted a grant proposal in response to an RFP focused on creating standardized pre-arrest tools for police officers to use to decide which drivers were impaired. The NHTSA funded her proposal, and Burns and Moskowitz began the research in 1975.

Burns began by conducting a literature survey. No researchers in the US, including her, had any significant background in roadside testing. Her survey did find research by Penttilä, Tenhu, and Kataja, who did a retrospective study of the 15 tests then in use by Finnish law enforcement. Burns also examined officer training manuals and went on ride-alongs with the DUI or special enforcement teams of several police departments. Burns observed numerous tests which had been devised, adopted, and modified by officers, with no records of origin or validation of the tests. Burns also observed inconsistent practices, such as some departments not using tests at all. Burns compiled a list of around 15 to 20 tests. She conducted a series of pilot studies, statistical analyses, and practical considerations, and reduced this list to three "recommended" tests: the one-leg stand, walk-and-turn, and alcohol gaze nystagmus. By 1981, officers in the United States began using this battery of standardized sobriety tests to help make decisions about whether to arrest suspected impaired drivers. As the Los Angeles Police Department was among the first to use these field tests, the law enforcement community sometimes referred to them as the "California tests". The tests were used in real-world conditions and reported as being able to determine intoxication above the then-effective blood alcohol concentration (BAC) limit of .10 grams per deciliter (g/dL) of blood. After some US states began lowering their legal BAC limits to .08 g/dL, other studies reported that the battery could also be used to detect BACs at or above .08 g/dL and above and below .04 g/dL.

=== Use and purpose ===
The NHTSA has developed a model system for managing standardized field sobriety test (SFST) training. They have published several training manuals associated with FSTs. FSTs and SFSTs are promoted as "used to determine whether a subject is impaired", but FST tests are widely regarded having, as their primary purpose, establishing tangible evidence of "probable cause for arrest" ("reasonable grounds" in Canada). A secondary purpose is to provide supporting corroborative tangible evidence for use against the suspect for use at trial. Probable cause is necessary under US law (4th Amendment) to sustain an arrest and invocation of the implied consent law.

Similar considerations apply under the Canadian requirement to establish "reasonable grounds" for making an approved instrument demand, by establishing that there is reasonable and probable cause which lies at the "point where credibly-based probability replaces suspicion". It is likely that, if FSTs are being used, some equivalent to probable cause is necessary to sustain a conviction based on a demand for a chemical test.

While the primary purpose of FSTs is to document probable cause or the equivalent, in some jurisdictions, FST performance can be introduced as corroborating evidence of impairment.

== Testing ==
During a traffic stop, upon suspicion of DUI, the officer will administer one or more field sobriety tests. FSTs are considered "divided attention tests" that test the suspect's ability to perform the type of mental and physical multitasking that is required to operate an automobile. According to the NHTSA, a suspect does not "pass" or "fail" a field sobriety test, but rather the police determine whether "clues" are observed during the test. Nevertheless, some of the literature will still include comments that a suspect "fails" one or more of these tests.

=== Standardized field sobriety tests ===
The three tests chosen to constitute the standardized field sobriety tests (SFSTs), which have been validated by NHTSA, are:

1. The horizontal gaze nystagmus test, which involves following an object with the eyes (such as a pen) to determine characteristic eye movement reaction.
2. The walk-and-turn test (heel-to-toe in a straight line). This test is designed to measure a person's ability to follow directions and remember a series of steps while dividing attention between physical and mental tasks.
3. The one-leg-stand test

Most law enforcement agencies use this three-test battery on all DUI traffic stops.

On the subject of standardization, Burns stated that the tests must be administered in a standardized way in order to have meaning as objective measures. That is, the instructions must be given properly, and the critical elements of the test must be preserved, for the scientific studies to meaningfully validate the results of the tests. Up through 2009, NHTSA manuals stated: (emphasis and capitalization as originally supplied)

IT IS NECESSARY TO EMPHASIZE THIS VALIDATION APPLIES ONLY WHEN:

- THE TESTS ARE ADMINISTERED IN THE PRESCRIBED, STANDARDIZED MANNER; THE STANDARDIZED CLUES ARE USED TO ASSESS THE SUSPECT’S PERFORMANCE AND THE STANDARDIZED CRITERIA ARE EMPLOYED TO INTERPRET THAT PERFORMANCE.
- IF ANY ONE OF THE STANDARDIZED FIELD SOBRIETY TEST ELEMENTS IS CHANGED, THE VALIDITY IS COMPROMISED.

==== Horizontal gaze nystagmus test (HGN) ====
The first test that is typically administered is the horizontal gaze nystagmus or HGN test, which is administered by the police officer checking the test subject's eyes. During this test, the officer looks for involuntary jerking of the suspect's eyes as they gaze toward the side. The officer checks for three clues in each eye, which gives six clues for this test. The clues are: lack of smooth pursuit of the eyes, distinct and sustained nystagmus at the eyes' maximum deviation and nystagmus starting before the eyes reach 45 degrees.

Horizontal gaze nystagmus instructions (HGN)

1. I am going to check your eyes. (Please remove your glasses)
2. Keep your head still and follow the stimulus with your eyes only.
3. Do not move your head.
4. Do you understand the instructions?

Horizontal gaze nystagmus evaluation
There are six cues or clues that a police officer is looking for on the horizontal gaze nystagmus test, they are as follows:

1. Lack of smooth pursuit
2. Distinct and sustained nystagmus and maximum deviation
3. Onset of nystagmus prior to 45 degrees

Total cues: 6 cues – decision point: 4/6 cues

While the original research indicated that 6 out of 6 clues (or cues) meant that a person was more likely above 0.08% at the time of the test, subsequent research conducted by the NHTSA has indicated that a "Hit" occurred when the number of reported signs for a given BAC fell within the range: a > 0.06% at 4–6 clues; a 0.05 – 0.059% at 2–4 clues; a 0.03 – 0.049% at 0–4 clues and a < 0.03% at 0–2 cues or clues. The police may also then check for Vertical Gaze Nystagmus, which is used to test for high blood alcohol levels and/or the presence of certain drugs.

While the purpose is obtaining probable cause support for an arrest and possibly screening, in some jurisdictions, the HGN test may be used as corroborating evidence at the trial stage. US jurisdictions differ on whether trial use of the HGN test requires that an expert establish a reliable foundation, as required under the Daubert standard.

==== Walk and turn test (WAT) ====
The second test that is usually administered is the walk and turn test, or WAT test. This test measures the suspect's ability to maintain their balance, walk in a straight line, and follow directions. To perform the test, the suspect will take nine heel-to-toe steps along a straight line during which time they must keep their arms to their side and count each step out loud. While the suspect performs this test, the officer is attempting to observe if the suspect fails to follow instructions; is having difficulty keeping their balance; stops walking in order to regain their balance; takes an incorrect number of steps; or fails to walk the line heel-to-toe.

The walk-and-turn test is composed of two phases: the instruction phase and walking phase. During the test, the individual is directed to take nine steps along a straight line. The individual is supposed to walk heel to toe, and while looking down at a real or imaginary line, count the steps out loud. The test subject's arms must remain at their side. Reaching the ending point, the individual must turn around using a series of small steps, and return to the starting point. The proper instruction, according to the NHTSA guidelines, is as follows:

Walk-and-turn test instructions

1. Put your left foot on the line, then place your right foot on the line ahead of your left, with the heel of your right foot against the toe of your left foot.
2. Do not start until I tell you to do so.
3. Do you understand? (must receive affirmative response)
4. When I tell you to begin, take 9 heel-to-toe steps on the line (demonstrate) and take 9 heel-to-toe steps back down the line.
5. When you turn on the ninth step, keep your front foot on the line and turn taking several small steps with the other foot (demonstrate) and take 9 heel-to-toe steps back down the line.
6. Ensure you look at your feet, count each step out loud, keep your arms at your side, ensure you touch heel-to-toe and do not stop until you have completed the test.
7. Do you understand the instructions?
8. You may begin.
9. If the suspect does not understand some part of the instructions, only the part in which the suspect does not understand should be repeated

Walk-and-turn test evaluation
There are eight cues or clues that a police officer is looking for on the walk & turn test; they are as follows:

1. Can’t keep balance during instructions
2. Starts too soon
3. Stops walking
4. Misses heel-to-toe
5. Steps off line
6. Uses arms for balance
7. Improper turn
8. Incorrect number of steps

Total cues: 8 cues – decision point: 2/8 cues

==== One leg stand test (OLS) ====
The other standardized test is the one leg stand (OLS). The OLS test requires the suspect to stand on one leg for 30 seconds and also measures balance, coordination, and similar to the WAT test, divides the suspect's attention. The officer is looking for any of the four possible clues: Sways while balancing, uses arms for balance, hopping and puts their foot down.

The one-leg stand test is composed of two stages: the Instruction phase and balancing phase. The proper instruction, according to the NHTSA guidelines, is as follows:

One-leg stand test instructions

1. Stand with your feet together and your arms at your side (demonstrate).
2. Maintain position until told otherwise.
3. When I tell you to, I want you to raise one leg, either one, approximately 6 inches off the ground, foot pointed out, both legs straight and look at the elevated foot. Count out loud in the following manner: 1001, 1002, 1003, 1004 and so on until told to stop.
4. Do you understand the instructions?
5. You may begin the test.

One-leg stand test evaluation There are four cues or clues that a police officer is looking for on the one-leg stand test; they are as follows:

1. Sways while balancing
2. Uses arms to balance
3. Hops
4. Puts foot down

Total cues: 4 cues – decision point: 2/4 cues

=== Other tests ===
The NHTSA training lists several alternative tests. The term "non-standardized" is used (in contrast to SFSTs), but it is also referenced by the NHTSA as "other sobriety tests". Some of these tests have been scientifically studied and found reliable, while others have not, but in general they do not have as much evidence as the SFSTs. Nevertheless, these tests are common in North America, because the primary purpose of FSTs is to establish probable cause to sustain an arrest and invoke the implied consent law, and thus they do not need to be scientifically validated. In Ohio, only the standardized tests will be admitted into evidence, provided they were administered and objectively scored "in substantial compliance" with NHTSA standards (ORC 4511.19(D)(4)(b)). Such tests include:

- Romberg test, or the modified-position-of-attention test, (feet together, head back, eyes closed for thirty seconds, measure swaying).
- The finger-to-nose test (tip head back, eyes closed, touch the tip of nose with tip of index finger).
- The alphabet test (recite all or part of the alphabet, forwards or backwards).
- The finger count test (touch each finger of hand to thumb counting with each touch (1, 2, 3, 4, 4, 3, 2, 1)).
- The counting test (counting backwards from a number ending in a number other than 5 or 0 and stopping at a number ending other than 5 or 0. The series of numbers should be more than 15).
- The preliminary alcohol screening test, PAS test or PBT, (breathe into a "portable or preliminary breath tester", PAS test or PBT).

==== Preliminary breath test (PBT) or preliminary alcohol screening test (PAS) ====
The preliminary breath test (PBT) or preliminary alcohol screening test (PAS) is sometimes categorised as part of 'field sobriety testing', although it is not part of the series of performance tests. The PBT (or PAS) uses a portable breath tester, but its primary use is for screening and establishing probable cause for arrest, to invoke the implied consent requirements or to establish "reasonable grounds" for making an approved instrument demand in Canada.

Different requirements apply in many states to drivers under DUI probation, in which case participation in a preliminary breath test (PBT) may be a condition of probation, and for commercial drivers under "drug screening" requirements. Some US states, notably California, have statutes on the books penalizing PBT refusal for drivers under 21; however the Constitutionality of those statutes has not been tested. (As a practical matter, most criminal lawyers advise not engaging in discussion or "justifying" a refusal with the police.)

In Canada, PBT refusal may be considered a 'refusal' offense under Canada Criminal Code § 320.15(1). The status of PBT refusal in Australia is unclear, although in Western Australia it appears to mandate submission to PBTs under the Road Traffic Act 1974. (National states without probable cause or "reasonable grounds" requirements are of course likely to be less restrictive on PBT/PAS requirements.)

== Limitations and accuracy ==
The use of field sobriety tests (FST) during DUI stops is controversial. The training manuals associated with FSTs cite as statistics "correct-arrest decision accuracy", which measures positive predictive value, and the studies cited also list an "overall accuracy" figure, also called Rand accuracy. However, these statistics do not directly relate to the probability that drivers who fail the SFSTs are impaired, as both of these are affected by the prevalence rate. For example, the 1998 NHTSA study reports that the officer's decisions (Figure 4) had an overall accuracy of 90.6%, and an arrest accuracy of 89.7%. But 72% of drivers tested had BAC over 0.08%. If only 1% of drivers tested had BAC over 0.08%, the arrest accuracy would fall to 3.3% (due to a large number of false arrests) and the overall accuracy to 71.3%. Rubenzer alleges that FSD analysis reports do not meet scientific peer review standards: "The reports for all three studies issued by NHTSA are lacking much of the material and analysis expected in a scientific paper, and none have been published in peer-reviewed journals".

One can instead calculate the sensitivity and specificity, which are independent of prevalence. For the 1998 NHTSA study these are 98.1% and 71.1% respectively. The high sensitivity indicates that genuinely impaired drivers are correctly identified as impaired. However, the low specificity indicates a significant fraction of sober drivers will fail the tests. One study involved completely sober individuals who were asked to perform the standardized field sobriety tests, and their performances were videotaped. "After viewing the 21 videos of sober individuals taking the standardized field tests, the police officers believed that forty-six percent of the individuals had 'too much to drink'". In general, sober drivers will fail the tests for a variety of reasons, particularly those who are sedentary, elderly, obese, or have conditions affecting mobility such as Ehlers-Danlos syndrome. The walk-and-turn test in particular may be affected by fatigue, injury, illness, or nervousness. The NHTSA used to say that those who are 50 pounds or more overweight may have difficulty performing the test, and that the suspect must walk along a real line. Later NHTSA manuals removed the weight comment, and also inserted the phrase 'imaginary line' at the instruction phase, even though original research always used a visible line.

There are also concerns about how objective the SFSTs are. The inter-rater reliability—which measures how often different officers agree on the test results—ranges from 0.6 to 0.74, which is considered low to abysmal by most but "highly reliable" by some. Typically, what matters is the officer's decision based on everything the officer saw and inferred during the traffic stop—not just the results of the Standardized Field Sobriety Tests (SFSTs). The likelihood ratio for the SFSTs alone is 1.50 for 0.05% BAC and 1.87 for 0.01% BAC, "very weak", whereas the officer's judgment has a likelihood ratio between 3.8 and 4.4, a slight to moderate discrimination. In the opinion of Kane and Kane, the SFSTs have no clinically meaningful power to discriminate between drivers with high and low BACs. In the vast majority of cases, an officer has already decided that a person is impaired, and the field sobriety test is solely to bolster the officer's testimony in court regarding their decision to arrest.

== Field sobriety test refusals ==
In all US jurisdictions, participation in a field sobriety test is voluntary. (Police are not obliged to advise the suspect that participation in a FST or other pre-arrest procedures is voluntary. In contrast, formal evidentiary tests given under implied consent requirements are considered mandatory.)

A suspect requested to participate in a field sobriety test is likely to be told that the purpose is to determine whether the suspect is impaired; however, FST tests are widely regarded as having, as their primary purpose, gaining tangible evidence for use against the suspect. The evidence is important in the establishment of probable cause for arrest. Since 'probable cause' is necessary under US law (4th Amendment) to sustain an arrest and invocation of the implied consent law, it is important that the police document 'probable cause'.

=== "HGN first" ===
The NHTSA recommends administering the HGN test as the first of the SFSTs, but does not state the reason. FSTs are voluntary, so consideration is given to encourage suspects to comply with requests to participate in the tests. The HGN is characterized by the tester performing a visible activity, so the suspect is less likely to decline at that stage. The completion of one test increases the likelihood that the suspect will participate in follow-up FSTs. The suspect may also perceive the HGN (as administered) as having a scientific foundation.

In cases in which a PBT (or PAS) is administered first, the HGN may be administered after completion of other SFSTs, as the purpose of administering the HGN first is obviated by the PBT/PAS.

== National procedures ==
FSTs are primarily used in jurisdictions that require the police to establish probable cause for arrest (reasonable grounds in Canada and the United Kingdom) as a prerequisite for requiring a chemical blood alcohol test. FSTs are generally regarded as a curiosity elsewhere.

=== Australia ===
To determine impairment in countries such as Australia, a simple breath or urine test is often taken. If police suspect that a driver is under the influence of a substance such as alcohol, then the driver will undergo a breath test. If over the legal limit of 0.05g per 100 millilitres of blood, then a second breath test will be taken and used as evidence against the driver when charged with the offence. If a person is suspected to be under the influence of an illegal drug, they will be required to supply a urine sample. If the urine sample is positive, then the urine is sent for more testing to determine the exact drug taken (confirmation of being illegal or prescribed). A similar process to being over the legal BAC level is undertaken using the evidence to penalise the user.

=== Canada ===
Commentary varies on taking SFSTs in Canada. Some sources, especially official ones, indicate that the SFSTs are mandatory, and required under § 320.15(1) of the Criminal code, whereas other sources are silent on FST testing. The assertion regarding mandatory compliance with SFSTs is based on "failure to comply with a demand", as an offence under § 320.15(1) of the Criminal Code. Canada Criminal Code § 320.15 (1) addresses only chemical testing (breath, blood, etc.). There are some reports that refusal to submit to an SFST can result in the same penalties as impaired driving, but it is unclear whether there has ever been a prosecution under this interpretation of "failure to comply with a demand" as applied to SFSTs.

=== United Kingdom ===
In England, Scotland, and Wales, it is an offence to be "unfit to drive through drink or drugs" or "[drive] or [be] in charge of a motor vehicle with alcohol concentration above prescribed limit" under, respectively, section 4 or 5 of the Road Traffic Act 1988 (RTA). Similar provisions exist for Northern Ireland under the Road Traffic (Northern Ireland) Order 1995.

Where a police officer has reasonable suspicion that a driver is under the influence, Section 6 RTA gives the police power to require that the driver undertake a preliminary test which can then form grounds for arrest. If a driver is obviously under the influence, for example they are staggering or falling over or smell strongly of alcohol, this provides reasonable grounds for arrest, meaning that preliminary tests are not required (sections 4(6) and 6D(2)(b)). There are three types of preliminary test that can be used: PITs, a preliminary breath test (i.e. a breathalyser), or a preliminary drug test (roadside drug tests that use a swab of sweat or saliva to detect controlled substances). The power to administer preliminary tests is governed by section 6 and these three specific tests by sections 6B, 6A and 6C of the Road Traffic Act respectively, together with statutory codes of practice issued by the Secretary of State for Transport. A Preliminary Impairment Test is not a prerequisite of any arrest, and the FIT code of practice says "It is not possible to 'pass' or 'fail' all or any one of the tests", but the officer may deem the results of any one or all three of these tests to provide reasonable grounds for arrest. The tests used are at the discretion of the police officer, and they may use all three if they deem it appropriate. Failure to comply with a preliminary test without a reasonable excuse (such as a medical condition) is itself an offence and also provides grounds for arrest. Once arrested by the officer on suspicion of drink driving or for refusing to comply with a preliminary test, a driver can subsequently be made to take an evidentiary test which can be used in criminal proceedings under section 7 of the RTA.

Due to the evidentiary test which uses far more accurate equipment, preliminary tests are rarely used in court to prove the fact of the offence, but rather that the arrest was reasonable. Further, in cases where a preliminary test is inadmissible due to it being improperly or unlawfully conducted, this does not usually affect the legality of the evidentiary test.

The PITs used in the UK are based on the American Drug Evaluation and Classification (DEC) system, a derivative of the standardized field sobriety test. PITs consist of the following tests conducted by the roadside:

- Pupilliary examination
- The modified Romberg balance test
- Walk and turn test
- One leg stand
- Finger to nose test

PITs can only be conducted by specifically trained officers. While all frontline officers receive training in breath testing, a separate 3 day course is required to deliver PITs and roadside drug tests; this course is only routinely taken by specialist traffic police officers. Additionally, PITs may only be conducted by officers wearing uniform. The RTA also requires the government to publish and review a specific code of practice for PITs.

PITs have been criticised for a number of reasons. Some argue that the tests lack scientific validation, with the Faculty of Forensic and Legal Medicine withdrawing their support for PITs as the test had never been calibrated using a control group of drivers not under the influence of drink or drugs. Another criticism is that "impairment" is poorly defined in legislation and police guidelines, and that the tests would also measure impairment not caused by drink or drugs. Similarly, PITs are often criticised for being subjective, with studies of similar field tests producing high numbers of false positives. Further, unlike the DEC system it is based on, PITs do not score subjects based on certain indicators or have a set pass/fail mark, with officers having to make a general decision based on what they observe.

=== United States ===
In the United States, DUI primarily falls under state law, but is still subject to federal constitutional requirements, specifically the Fifth Amendment right against self-incrimination. Thus, in all jurisdictions, participation in FSTs is voluntary.

In the US, the legal procedure is 'police stop' (police stop requiring "reasonable suspicion" or another qualified reason for a police stop), 'probable cause', and 'arrest'. FSTs are requested in the 'police stop' phase, and are used to provide tangible evidence sufficient to meet the requirements for 'probable cause' for an arrest. Evidential tests are performed in the 'arrest' stage, although the terminology may vary. Regardless of the terminology, in order to sustain a conviction based on evidential tests, 'probable cause' must be shown (or the suspect must volunteer to take the evidential test without implied consent requirements being invoked).

Police are not obliged to advise the suspect that participation in a FST or other pre-arrest procedures is voluntary. In contrast, formal evidentiary tests given under implied consent requirements are considered mandatory.
