= Random checkpoint =

Temporary military or police roadblock

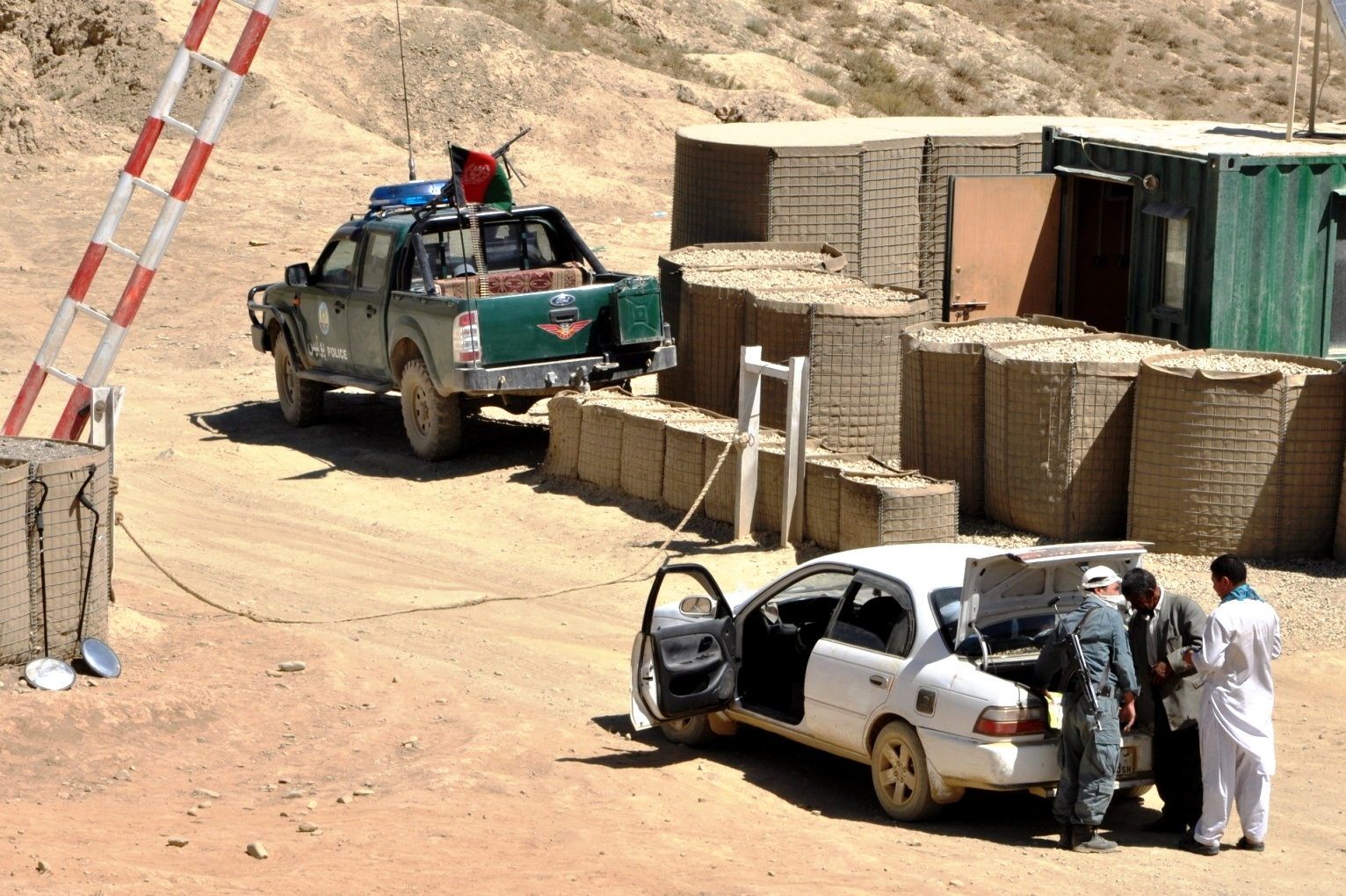
An Afghan National Police officer searching a vehicle at a checkpoint in Bamyan Province, Afghanistan during the War in Afghanistan

A random checkpoint is a military and police tactic. In a military context, checkpoints involve the setup of a hasty roadblock by mobile truck- or armored vehicle-mounted infantry to disrupt unauthorized or unwanted movement or military activity and to check for valid identification and search for contraband, fugitives, or weapons that are not permitted in civilian hands. Random checkpoints are set up to achieve surprise, as opposed to known permanently located checkpoints, which suspects could avoid. They are often established in locations where they cannot be observed by approaching traffic until it is too late to withdraw and escape unnoticed.

Patrol car-equipped police units regularly use random checkpoints to detect drivers who are suspected of impaired driving. Police also use hastily set up roadblocks to check cars and car trunks when they are pursuing an armed and dangerous fugitive. As with military checkpoints, sobriety checkpoints and fugitive roadblock searches are located in an area where drivers cannot see the checkpoint until it is too late to withdraw, and checkpoints are only set up on a temporary basis.

== Military use ==
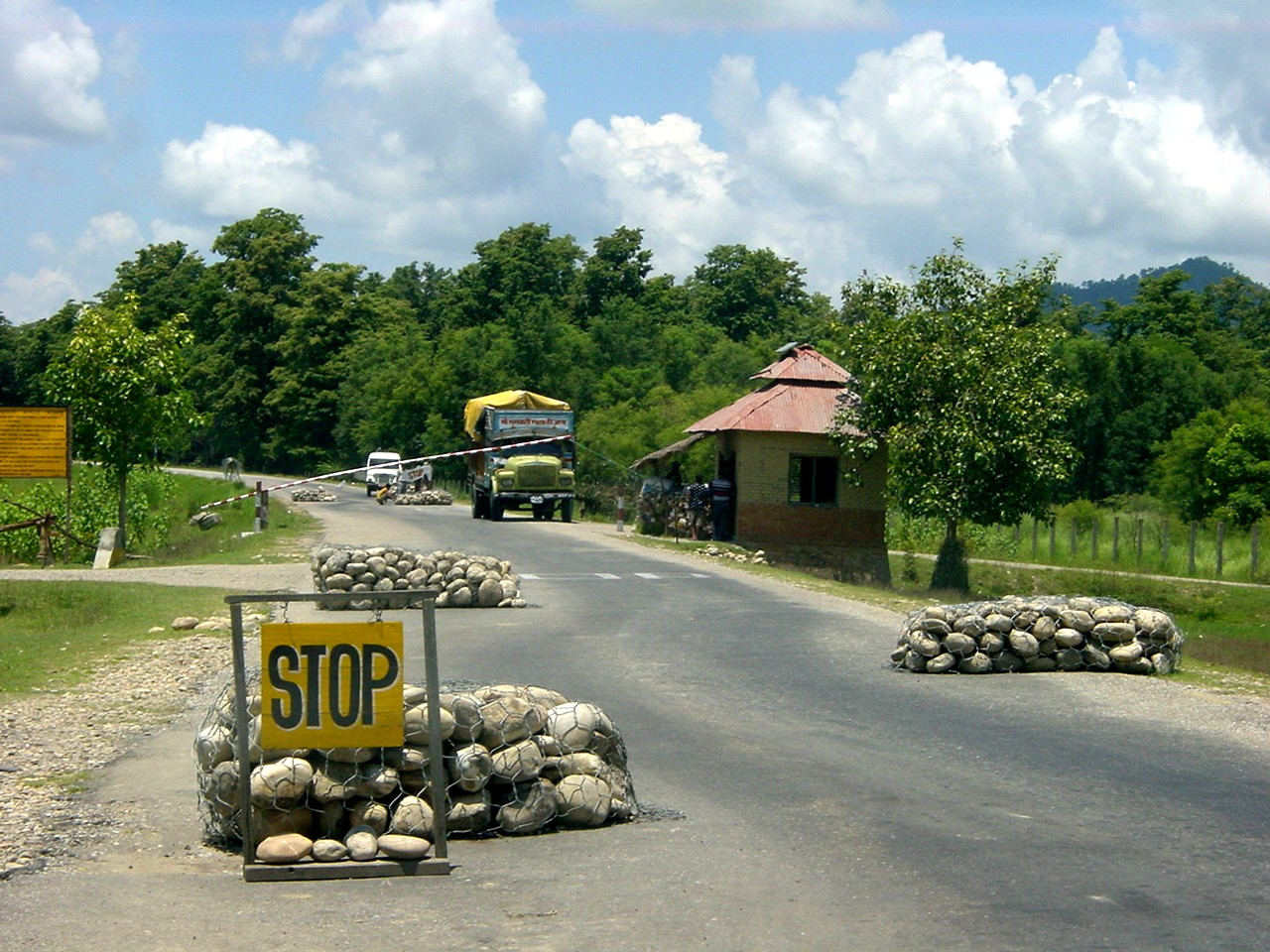
A security checkpoint in Nepal, established to check for Maoist insurgents, during the Nepalese Civil War

The unit establishing a military checkpoint must carry or obtain the materials necessary to construct it. It might use a large vehicle, or multiple vehicles, such as armored personnel carriers to block the road. In addition to blocking the road with vehicles, the road may also be partially blocked with concertina wire or heavy objects, such as sandbags or concrete blocks. The vehicles might be positioned to partially or entirely block the road or route. The search area might be the space between multiple vehicles. Sentries might be positioned at each end of the checkpoint and are covered by mounted or dismounted machine gun positions. A reaction force may be designated and concealed nearby.

Vehicular and pedestrian traffic that approach with the intent of passing flying checkpoints can be asked to produce identification and submit to a search of their persons or vehicle. The trunks of cars are typically searched. In some countries, soldiers inspect the bottom of the car with a mirror to look for bombs. In some cases, people without proper identification or who arouse suspicion may be refused passage, detained, or arrested. Contraband may be confiscated. A random checkpoint must be functional within 15 minutes of the unit's arrival on-site, and establish security teams 50–100 meters on both sides of the area to be controlled. Advanced observation posts may also be positioned further out if desired. When large geographical areas need to be monitored, some types of checkpoint may be quickly airlifted by helicopter from one location to another.

Flying roadblocks and checkpoints are usually established for no more than a few hours, in order to decrease the possibility of insurgent attacks on them, as well as to maintain their effectiveness as a surprising, unexpected obstacle.

Random checkpoints are a common tactic used by many military forces, and have been recently used by UN forces in Kosovo, the Israeli army in the West Bank and US forces in Iraqi Kurdistan, and Iraq in search of insurgents, fugitives, and other law breakers. In some war zones, soldiers working at these checkpoints can be severely injured or killed if one of the vehicles they are searching contains a suicide bomber who detonates his or her bomb or if one of the occupants fires upon soldiers.

== Random security checkpoints ==
=== India ===
In India, checkpoints or more popularly known as checkposts are used to check and control the movement of people, vehicles, contraband and goods. These checkposts are put up by military, police, forest or transport departments, mines and sometimes by an agriculture department. The checkposts are usually set up beside roads and highways and sometimes in remote areas or forest. The checkpost may be permanent or temporary depending on circumstances and other reasons. The structure of these checkposts may be composed of tents or thatched roofs or RCC slabs. Many times, temporary checkposts are put during elections, fairs and festivals.

== Sobriety checkpoints ==
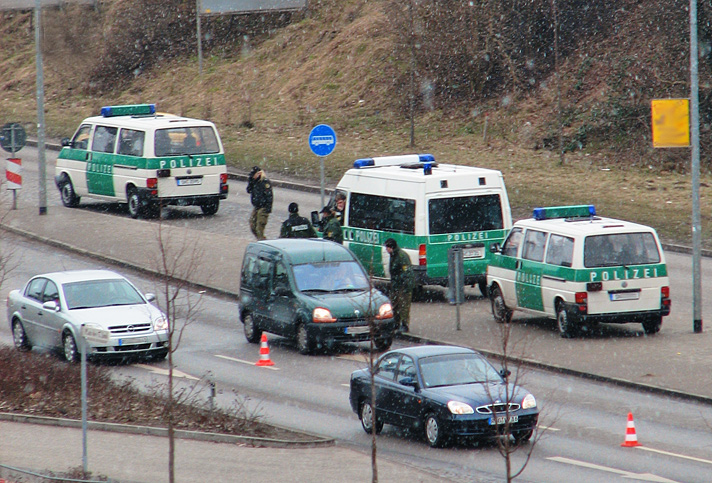
Sobriety checkpoints set up by the German Police

Sobriety checkpoints or roadblocks involve law enforcement officials stopping every vehicle (or more typically, every nth vehicle) on a public roadway and investigating the possibility that the driver might be too impaired to drive due to alcohol or drug consumption. They are often set up late at night or in the very early morning hours and on weekends, and on holidays associated with parties (e.g., New Year's Eve) at which time the proportion of impaired drivers tends to be the highest. Checkpoints are also often set near the exit points of public events where people have been drinking to prevent large numbers of drunk drivers from being released into traffic simultaneously from the event. A roadblock stop is quick action spot for police as well as security personnel.

With a portable and quick breathalyzer test, the police can test all drivers (if the law permits) for their breath alcohol content (BrAC), and process the cars one by one as if in a conveyor belt. If a police force does not have these testing devices, a more complicated routine is necessary. Upon suspicion that the driver has consumed alcohol, due to the officer noting the smell of alcohol, slurred speech, or other signs, the stopped driver is required to exit the vehicle and asked to take a series of roadside field sobriety tests. These tests help the officer to determine whether the person's physical and/or mental skills are impaired. If the officer determines based on his/her observations during the tests that the driver is impaired and has probable cause to arrest the person for suspicion of driving under the influence, the arrestee will be asked to take an alcohol breath test or a blood test. The driver cannot "pass" or "fail" a field sobriety test as they are not "pass-or-fail", they are only meant to aid the officer in determining if a suspect is impaired based on observations of the subject's performance on these tests. There are various guidelines outlined by jurisdictional and international law for sobriety checkpoints; for example, in the U.S., field sobriety tests are voluntary.

In the United States, while the Fourth Amendment (1791) protects people against unreasonable searches and seizures of either self or property by government officials, the use of sobriety checkpoints by police is not prohibited by the Fourth Amendment. Some states such as Washington state have determined that sobriety checkpoints are unconstitutional under state law. Law enforcement often posts or announces in advance that these checkpoints will occur and at what location. Law enforcement agencies often post a sign during the weekdays when it is seen only by local residents and not by those attending a special event or those that only travel in that area of the city during the weekend to patronize local bars and clubs. These announcements are also sometimes printed in newspapers. Numerous websites host a database of checkpoints that are to occur based on information found in newspapers, the Internet and tips from visitors of such sites. In the 2010s, there are smartphone apps that allow users to report sobriety checkpoints, show them on a map and use the device's GPS to alert other drivers when a sobriety checkpoint is nearby.

Sobriety checkpoints regularly catch much more than just drunk drivers, as those selected to participate in the checkpoint are asked to provide their driver's licenses. As part of the standard protocol, the person's name and identifying information is run through the National Crime Information Center database, or NCIC, for wants and warrants. If the driver has an outstanding warrant, they will likely be arrested. If they were driving without a valid license, they will likely be cited for driving with a suspended or revoked license. The identity checks could also catch vehicle inspection and registration violations as well. When an individual is stopped for a sobriety check, the officer may also determine that they have probable cause to search the vehicle, which may lead to the officer finding illegal drugs or weapons.

=== Australia ===
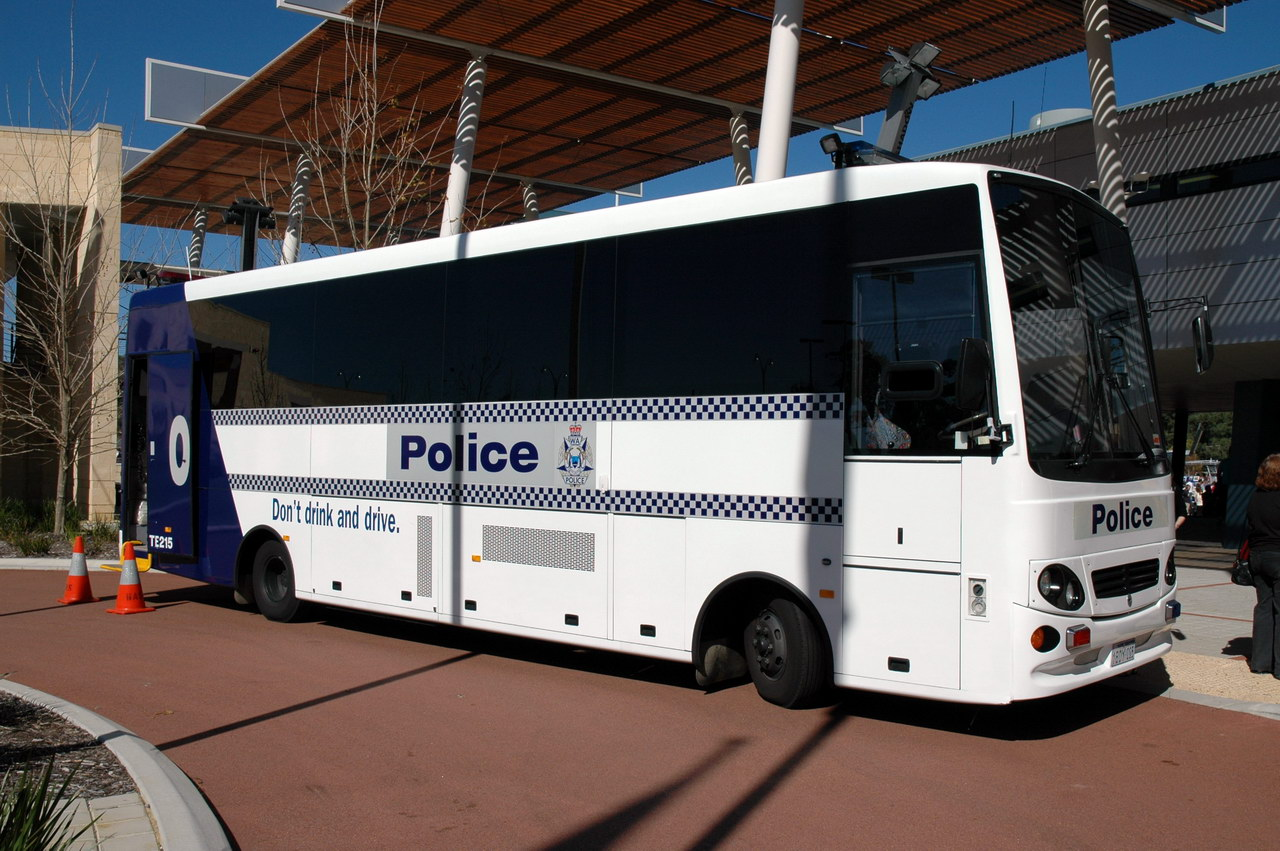
A Western Australia Police Booze Bus

In Australia, drivers may be stopped at any point along any public road by a police officer for what police term a "random breath test", commonly referred to as an "RBT". For an operation involving a large number of police (typically 10–20) at a fixed location, the colloquial term "booze bus" is often used.

In July 1976, legislation allowing Random Breath Testing (RBT) came into force in the State of Victoria, with this being the first State in Australia to introduce such. New South Wales began its own large RBT road safety campaign in 1982. Since then, fatal crashes involving alcohol have dropped from about 40 per cent of all fatalities to the 2012 level of 15 per cent. Police conduct about 5 million breath tests each year in NSW with every police car in the State able to conduct mobile RBT.

In all states, the maximum blood alcohol content of 0.05% is enforced. Drivers who are found to have a preliminary reading of equal to or greater than 0.05% are usually arrested and taken to the police station or RBT/"booze bus" to undertake a breath analysis. The machine used to perform a breath analysis is more sophisticated than the portable device that is used to administer a roadside RBT with the results of a breath analysis being used as evidence in court to prove a drunk driving charge.

In all states and territories the concept has been extended to make sobriety checkpoints also use "Random Drug Test (RDT) buses" (or "dual buses"), capable of testing drivers for a number of illicit drugs including cannabis (tetrahydrocannabinol), methamphetamine, and ecstasy (MDMA).

RBT activities even feature on a popular Australian reality television series known by the same name, RBT (TV series).

As of late 2017 the NSW Police Force has announced it is going to expand its mobile drug testing to include cocaine in 2018. Trials of the program will be in Sydney's eastern suburbs. Drunk driving continues to be one of the main causes of road fatalities and injuries, responsible for 30 percent of road fatalities across Australia.

=== Canada ===
In Ontario, Canada, sobriety checkpoints are referred to as Reduce Impaired Driving Everywhere, commonly referred to as RIDE. In Alberta and Manitoba they are referred to as Check Stop, and in British Columbia, they are known as Drinking Driving Counterattack.

=== China ===
On February 6, 2025, a Boxing County Public Security Bureau traffic police officer was killed when he was rammed by a vehicle attempting to escape a sobriety checkpoint.

=== United States ===
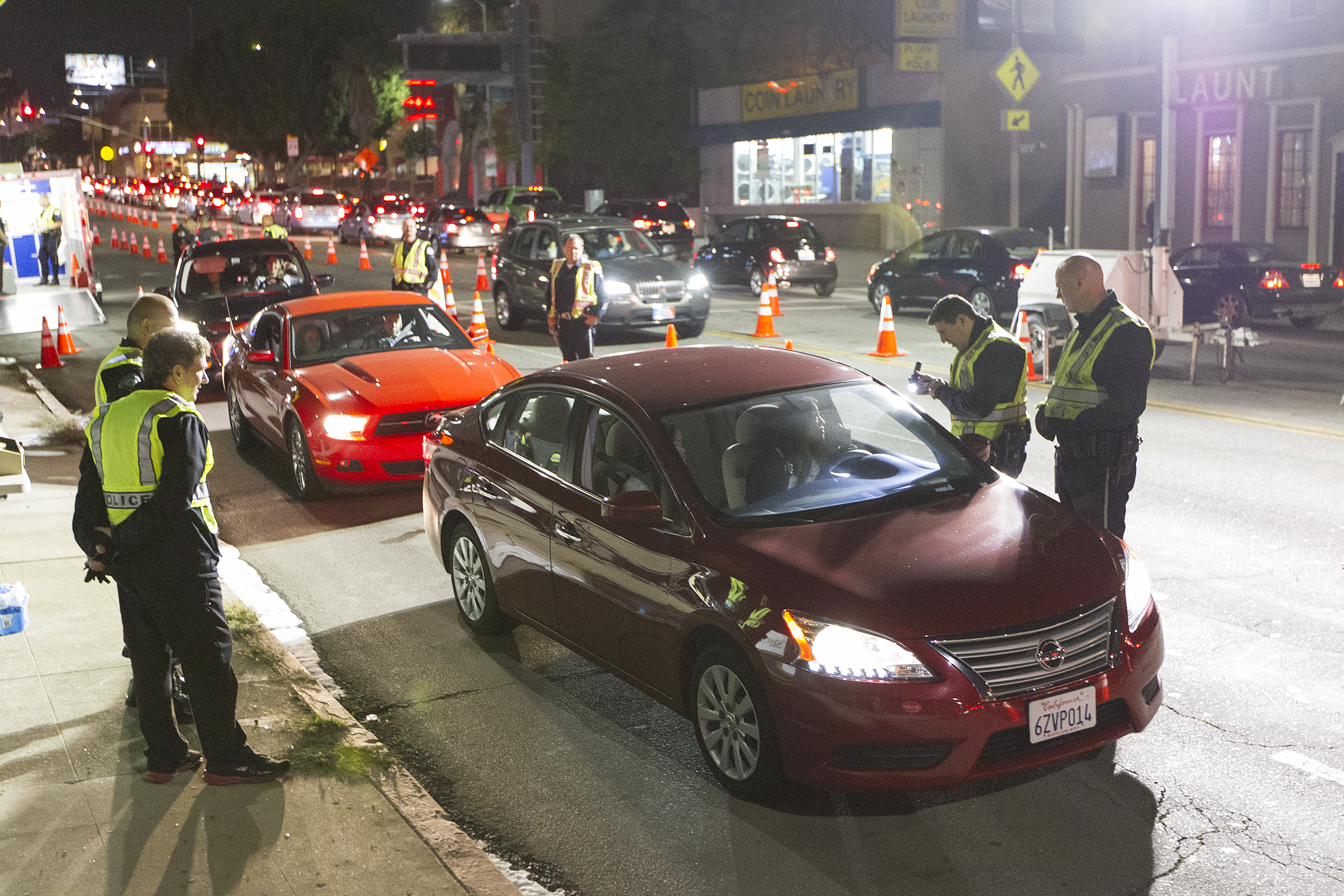
Los Angeles Police Department officers at a sobriety checkpoint during the Memorial Day weekend, 2014

==== Legality ====
The Fourth Amendment to the United States Constitution states that: “The right of the people to be secure in their persons, houses, papers, and effects, against unreasonable searches and seizures, shall not be violated, and no Warrants shall issue, but upon probable cause, supported by Oath or affirmation, and particularly describing the place to be searched, and the persons or things to be seized.” This fundamental right has a tense relationship with sobriety checkpoints. At a sobriety checkpoint, drivers are necessarily stopped without reasonable suspicion, and may be asked to be tested summarily and without probable cause. Thus the Constitution would prohibit people from being stopped without a search warrant or at least without reasonable suspicion that they have committed a crime; however, the warrant requirement only attaches should the search be unreasonable and the U.S. Supreme Court has ruled that such stops are not unreasonable under certain circumstances.

Driving under the influence of alcohol, or drunk driving, is a special type of crime, as driving with a blood alcohol content (BAC) over a set limit is defined as the crime; it is not necessary to drive recklessly or cause an accident in order to be convicted (although an impaired driver who also drives recklessly could face additional charges). To determine BAC accurately, it is generally necessary for the driver to subject himself to tests that are self-incriminating, and drivers sometimes exercise their right against self-incrimination to refuse these tests. To discourage this, some jurisdictions set the legal penalties for refusing a BAC test as equal to or worse than those for failing a BAC test. In other jurisdictions, the legal system may consider refusing the roadside alcohol breath test to be probable cause, allowing police to arrest the driver and conduct an involuntary BAC test.

The Michigan Supreme Court found sobriety roadblocks to violate the Fourth Amendment. However, by a 6–3 decision in Michigan Dept. of State Police v. Sitz (1990), the United States Supreme Court found properly conducted sobriety checkpoints to be constitutional. In the majority opinion, Chief Justice Rehnquist wrote, "In sum, the balance of the State's interest in preventing drunken driving, the extent to which this system can reasonably be said to advance that interest, and the degree of intrusion upon individual motorists who are briefly stopped, weighs in favor of the state program. We therefore hold that it is consistent with the Fourth Amendment." Dissenting justices argued against this conclusion. Justice Stevens argued that the checkpoints were not reasonably effective, writing that "the findings of the trial court, based on an extensive record and affirmed by the Michigan Court of Appeals, indicate that the net effect of sobriety checkpoints on traffic safety is infinitesimal and possibly negative." Justice Brennan's dissenting opinion argued that the police had failed to show that the checkpoint seizures were a necessary tool and worth the intrusion on individual privacy. "That stopping every car might make it easier to prevent drunken driving...is an insufficient justification for abandoning the requirement of individualized suspicion," he stated.

Jurisdictions often create specific exceptions to their normal civil protections in order to allow sobriety checkpoints. Although the U.S. Supreme Court has found sobriety checkpoints to be constitutionally permissible, ten states (Idaho, Iowa, Michigan, Minnesota, Oregon, Rhode Island, Texas, Washington, Wisconsin, and Wyoming) have found that sobriety roadblocks violate their own state constitutions or have outlawed them. One other state (Alaska) does not use checkpoints even though it has not made them illegal. Montana uses checkpoints frequently. Some states combine their efforts in establishing sobriety-checkpoint initiatives, such as Checkpoint Strikeforce, jointly run by Virginia, Washington, D.C., Delaware, West Virginia, and Maryland.

In California, shortly after a 1984 state attorney general's opinion (67 Ops Atty. Gen. 471 (1984, #84-902)) that devised "strict guidelines" for the legality of drunk-driving roadblocks, police departments and the California Highway Patrol (CHP) began using DUI checkpoints to apprehend drunk drivers. In Ingersoll v. Palmer (1987) 43 Cal.3d 1321, the California Supreme Court approved the use of roadblocks that are executed pursuant to the "strict guidelines" set forth by the Ingersoll court and are operated in a manner consistent with the federal and state constitutions.

Aside for cases of sobriety checkpoints, border security (at points of entry into the United States) and fugitive apprehension, roadblocks or checkpoints for the purpose of general law enforcement are expressly unconstitutional according to City of Indianapolis v. Edmond, "Because the checkpoint program's primary purpose is indistinguishable from the general interest in crime control, the checkpoints violate the Fourth Amendment." This prohibits checkpoints erected to interdict narcotics or detect evidence of other illegal activities. However, this does not prevent police departments from attempting these types of checkpoints because they can be a significant source of revenue, particularly near festival periods like college spring break. Many individuals who are apprehended for possession of narcotics at these checkpoints are unlikely to be fully prosecuted on those charges, but the police will collect all fees associated with the arrest before reducing the charges or dismissing them altogether.

Because of some inconsistencies between the laws and actual police practice, some individuals maintain that DUI checkpoints are a violation of civil rights under the Constitution. Such checkpoints have been the subject of protests, such as individuals holding signs warning drivers "Police ahead, turn now."

==== Legal guidelines ====
In approving "properly conducted" checkpoints, Chief Justice Rehnquist implicitly acknowledged that there must be guidelines in order to prevent such checkpoints from becoming overly intrusive. In other words, checkpoints cannot simply be arranged when, where and how police officers choose to do so. As often happens in Supreme Court decisions, however, the Chief Justice left it to the states to determine what those minimal safeguards must be, presumably to be reviewed by the courts on a case-by-case basis. To provide standards for use by the states, the National Highway Traffic Safety Administration subsequently issued a report that reviewed recommended checkpoint procedures in keeping with federal and state legal decisions.

An additional source of guidelines can be found in an earlier decision by the California Supreme Court, Ingersoll v. Palmer (1987) 43 Cal.3d 1321, wherein the California State Supreme Court set forth what it felt to be necessary standards in planning and administering a sobriety checkpoint.

The Ingersoll guidelines fall under the following general headings:

1. Decision making at the supervisory level
2. Limits on discretion of field officers
3. Maintenance of safety conditions
4. Reasonable location
5. Time and duration
6. Indicia of official nature of roadblock
7. Length and nature of detention
8. Advance publicity

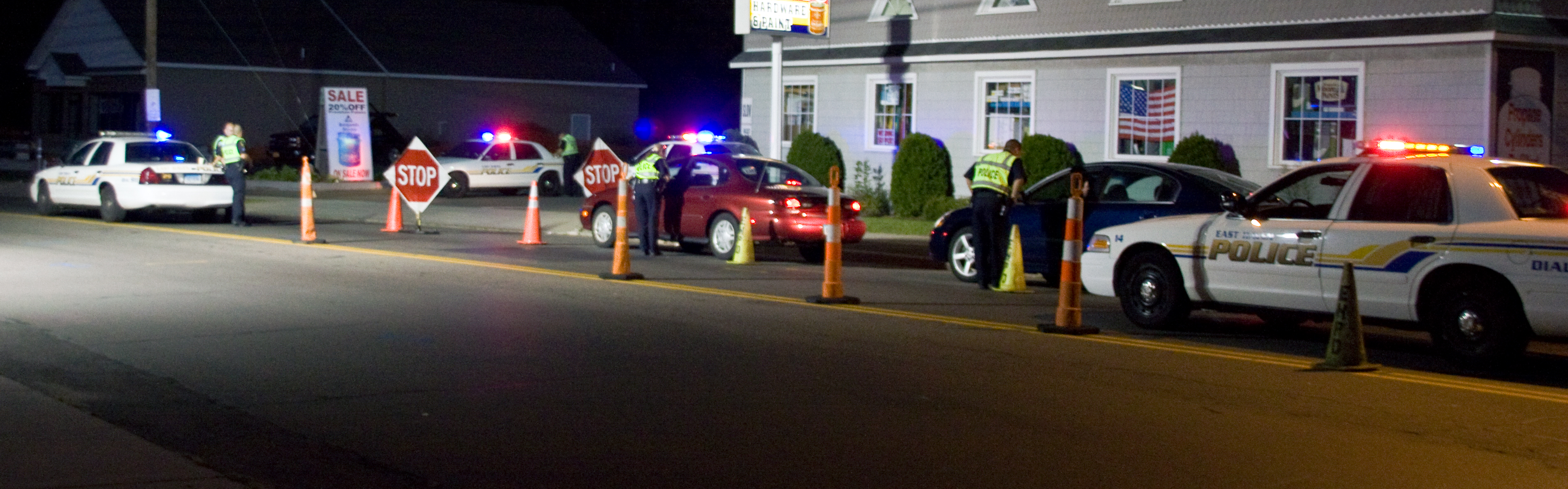
A sobriety checkpoint in East Haven, Connecticut

The U.S. Supreme Court's decision of Michigan Dep’t of State Police v. Sitz was decided after Ingersoll. The court did not criticize any of the Ingersoll guidelines, nor did it recommend any others, seemingly making it the law of the land and leaving the decision of whether to permit sobriety checkpoints to the individual states. In People v. Banks (1993) 6 Cal.4th 926, which was decided after Ingersoll and Sitz and incorporated a discussion of both cases in the opinion, the California Supreme Court held that '"advance publicity" is not an essential element of the constitutionally of a valid drunk-driving roadblock. The court concluded that although advance publicity remains a factor to consider, the lack of it alone does not render the roadblock unconstitutional. People v. Banks (1993) 6 Cal.4th 926.

The following considerations expand upon the general headings listed above:

- Decision making must be at a supervisory level, rather than by officers in the field.
- A neutral formula must be used to select vehicles to be stopped, such as every vehicle or every third vehicle, rather than leaving it up to the officer in the field.
- Primary consideration must be given to public and officer safety.
- The site should be selected by policy-making officials, based upon areas having a high incidence of drunk driving.
- Limitations on when the checkpoint is to be conducted and for how long, bearing in mind both effectiveness and intrusiveness.
- Warning lights and signs should be clearly visible.
- Length of detention of motorists should be minimized.
- Advance publicity is necessary to reduce the intrusiveness of the checkpoint and increase its deterrent effect.

==== Effectiveness ====
There is a dearth of research regarding the deterrent effect of checkpoints. The only formally documented research regarding deterrence is a survey of Maryland's "Checkpoint Strikeforce" program. The survey found no deterrent effect: "To date, there is no evidence to indicate that this campaign, which involves a number of sobriety checkpoints and media activities to promote these efforts, has had any impact on public perceptions, driver behaviors, or alcohol-related motor vehicle crashes and injuries. This conclusion is drawn after examining statistics for alcohol-related crashes, police citations for impaired driving, and public perceptions of alcohol-impaired driving risk." Centers for Disease Control and Prevention, in a 2002 Traffic Injury Prevention report, found that in general, the number of alcohol-related crashes was reduced by 20% in states that implement sobriety checkpoints compared to those that do not.

Public Health Law Research, an independent organization, reported in a 2009 evidence brief summarizing the research assessing the effect of a specific law or policy on public health that there is strong evidence supporting the effectiveness of selective breath-testing sobriety checkpoints as a public-health intervention to reducing the harms associated with alcohol-impaired driving.

There is a debate regarding whether saturation patrols or checkpoints are more effective. The FBI performed a study comparing saturation patrols against checkpoints in Ohio, Missouri, and Tennessee. The study showed that “[o]verall, measured in arrests per hour, a dedicated saturation patrol is the most effective method of apprehending offenders.” Another survey found that "States with infrequent checkpoints claimed a lack of funding and police resources for not conducting more checkpoints." The survey found that some states "...preferred saturation patrols over checkpoints because they were more 'productive'", given that "... [a] large number of police officers [were used] at checkpoints."

==== Controversy ====
In May 2015, a Chicago Tribune study found that between 2010 and 2014, a majority of sobriety checks in Chicago were conducted in black and Latino neighborhoods despite the fact that some white neighborhoods ranked among those with the highest number of alcohol-related traffic accidents.

== Fugitive roadblocks ==
Police also use hastily set up roadblocks to check cars and car trunks when they are pursuing an armed and dangerous fugitive, such as an escaped maximum security prisoner or a suspected armed robber or murderer who is believed to be fleeing from police. Police at such a checkpoint may be armed with shotguns, submachine guns or semiautomatic carbines, in addition to their duty sidearms, depending on the laws and regulations in a jurisdiction. When setting up these types of roadblocks, police in some jurisdictions have the authorization to lay a spike strip across the road, to prevent suspects from trying to drive through the roadblock.

== See also ==
- Civilian checkpoint
- Outpost
- Saturation patrol
- Redacted, a war film which depicts US soldiers guarding a checkpoint in Iraq during the Iraq War
