= United States Border Patrol interior checkpoints =

The United States Border Patrol operates 71 traffic checkpoints, including 33 permanent traffic checkpoints, near the Mexico–United States border. The stated primary purpose of these inspection stations is to deter illegal immigration and smuggling activities. After the September 11 attacks in 2001, they took on the additional role of terrorism deterrence. These checkpoints are located between 25 and 75 miles (40 and 121 km) of the Mexico–United States border along major U.S. highways; near the southern border of the contiguous United States. Their situation at interior locations allows them to deter illegal activities that may have bypassed official border crossings along the frontier. The checkpoints are divided among nine Border Patrol sectors. There are a number of these checkpoints near the northern border of the contiguous U.S. as well (such as in the states of New York or Maine), within 100 miles (160 km) of the Canada–U.S. border.

== Role of checkpoints ==
The checkpoints are described as "the third layer in the Border Patrol's three-layer strategy", following "line watch" and "roving patrol" operations near the border. According to the U.S. Government Accountability Office,

Border Patrol agents at checkpoints have legal authority that agents do not have when patrolling areas away from the border. The United States Supreme Court ruled that Border Patrol agents may stop a vehicle at fixed checkpoints for brief questioning of its occupants even if there is no reason to believe that the particular vehicle contains people unlawfully present in the country. The Court further held that Border Patrol agents "have wide discretion" to refer motorists selectively to a secondary inspection area for additional brief questioning. In contrast, the Supreme Court held that Border Patrol agents on roving patrol may stop a vehicle only if they have reasonable suspicion that the vehicle contains people who may be illegally in the United States—a higher threshold for stopping and questioning motorists than at checkpoints. The constitutional threshold for searching a vehicle is the same, however, and must be supported by either consent or probable cause, whether in the context of a roving patrol or a checkpoint search.

Under US law, people who enter the US without inspection (EWI) can be subjected to expedited removal if they are found within 100 miles of the border. This power has been subject to heavy criticism by the American Civil Liberties Union.

== Documentation at checkpoints ==
No documentation is required at Border Patrol checkpoints for US citizens; however, lawful permanent residents (LPRs) are required to carry their registration cards (green cards) "at all times" according to federal law. People in a non-immigrant status (for example, tourists) should carry proper documentation. In 2013, there was criticism of the Border Patrol for arresting people in a non-immigrant status at checkpoints (especially in New York), even though the aliens are lawfully present.

== List of permanent checkpoints ==
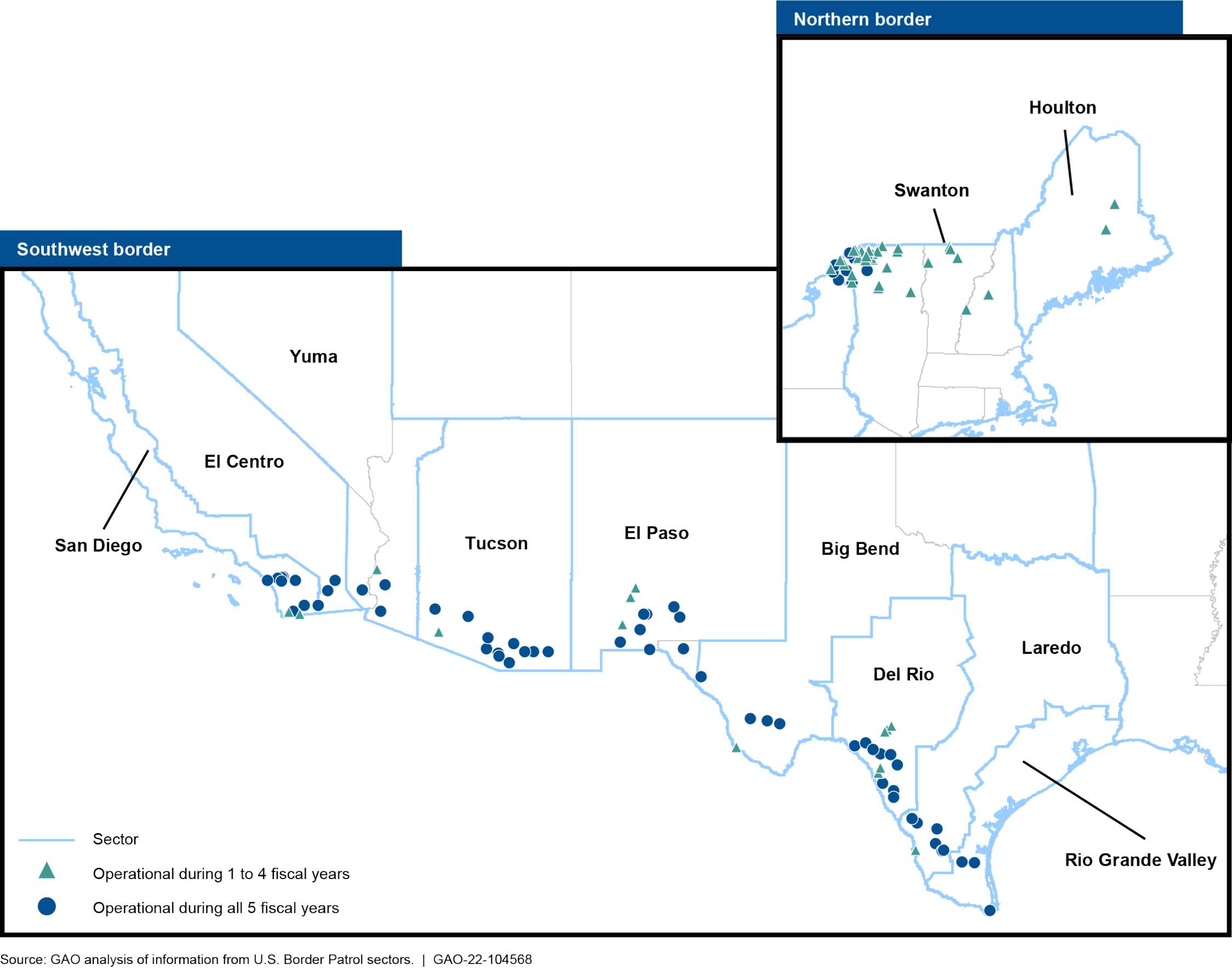
Border Patrol sectors and checkpoint locations for fiscal years 2016–2020

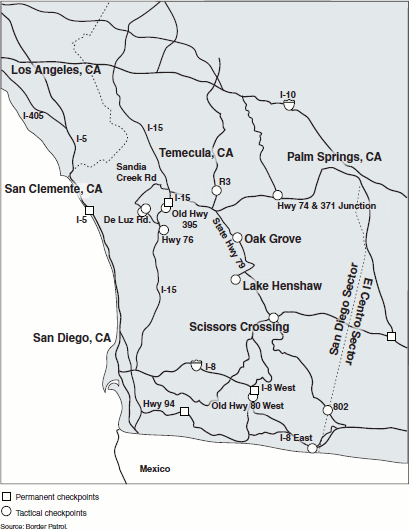
Permanent and tactical checkpoints in the San Diego sector

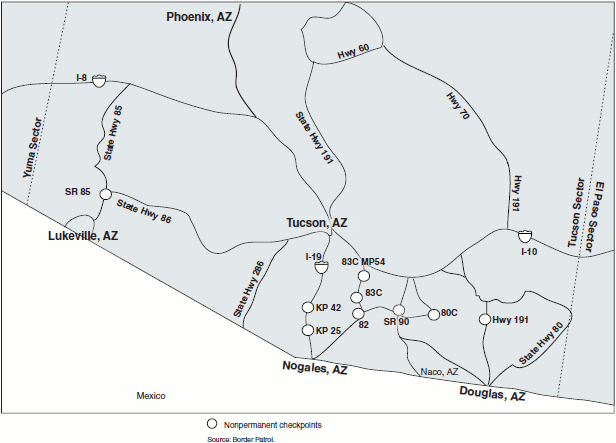
Permanent and tactical checkpoints in the Tucson sector

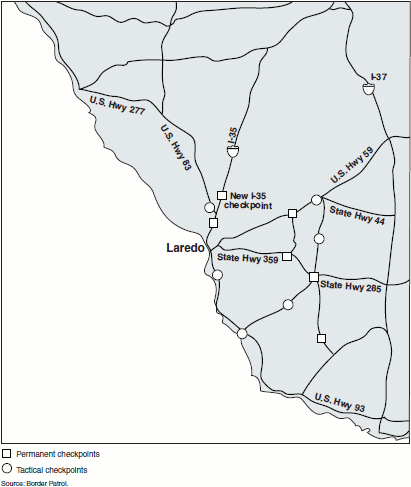
Permanent and tactical checkpoints in the Laredo sector

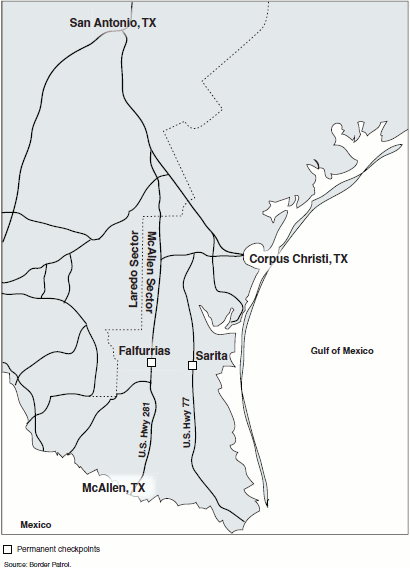
Permanent and tactical checkpoints in the Rio Grande Valley sector

=== California ===
- I-5 north (San Clemente) – Seven miles south of San Clemente – 33°21′09″N 117°31′32″W
- I-15 north (Temecula) – 24 miles north of Escondido and near Temecula – 33°26′49″N 117°08′05″W
- SR 79 north – One mile west of Sunshine Summit.
- I-8 west – Three miles east of Pine Valley – 32°47′50″N 116°29′47″W
- SR 94 west – 24 miles east of San Diego – 32°39′51″N 116°49′07″W
- CR S2 north – Seven miles north of Ocotillo and I-8 in eastern San Diego County on S2 (Imperial Highway/Sweeney Pass Road) between I-8 and State Route 78
- SR 86 north / SR 78 west – On the west side of the Salton Sea and just south of the intersection of California State Routes 78 and 86 – 33°07′30″N 115°51′17″W
- SR 111 north – On the east side of the Salton Sea between Niland and Bombay Beach – 33°21′37″N 115°38′41″W
- SR 78 east – just north of Ogilby Road (S34), 50 miles south of Blythe, and 40 miles east of Brawley.

=== Arizona ===
- US 95 north – heading north from Yuma to Quartzsite 53.4 mi N of Yuma 33°15′34″N 114°14′36″W
- I-8 east – 15 miles east of Yuma – 32°39′35″N 114°21′50″W
- SR 85 north –
  - 4.7 miles south of Why – 32°12′09″N 112°45′33″W
  - 18.4 miles south of Gila Bend – 32°42′53″N 112°50′31″W
- BIA Route 15 north – North of Sells near Kohatk – 32°33′03″N 111°55′45″W
- SR 286 north – heading north from Sasabe to Three Points – 31°49′42″N 111°25′29″W
- SR 86 east – heading east, off the Tohono Oʼodham Indian Reservation, before Three Points – 32°03′53″N 111°22′30″W
- Arivaca Road – heading northeast through Amado, near mile marker 22 – 31°43′34″N 111°04′47″W
- I-19 north – heading north from Nogales just north of Tubac – 31°39′42″N 111°03′40″W
- SR 90 north – heading north from Whetstone to Benson – 31°44′58″N 110°20′59″W
- SR 80 west – heading northwest from Tombstone to Benson (at junction with SR 82 west) – 31°44′57″N 110°05′51″W.

=== New Mexico ===
- I-10 west – 22 miles west of Las Cruces between mile markers 120–121 – 32°15′01″N 107°07′16″W
- NM 11 north – 22.6 miles south of Deming between mile markers 12–13 – 31°57′52″N 107°40′45″W
- I-25 north – 23 miles north of Las Cruces – 32°35′50″N 106°56′42″W
- NM 185 north – 13 miles northwest of Radium Springs between mile markers 25–26 – 32°36′12″N 107°01′17″W
- US 70 east (Alamogordo) – 15 miles southwest of Alamogordo between mile markers 198–199 – 32°45′55″N 106°10′54″W
- US 54 north – 30 miles south of Alamogordo between mile markers 40–41 – 32°31′43″N 106°01′42″W

=== Texas ===
- US 62 east / US 180 east –– 33 miles east of El Paso – 31°49′35″N 105°55′05″W
- I-10 east – Between El Paso and Van Horn, five miles west of Sierra Blanca – 31°11′30″N 105°25′47″W
- US 67 north (Marfa) – 4.5 miles south of Marfa – 30°15′06″N 104°02′58″W
- SH 118 north (Alpine) – Ten miles south of Alpine – 30°11′54″N 103°34′46″W
- US 385 north (Marathon) – 4.5 miles south of Marathon – 30°08′16″N 103°14′18″W
- US 277 north (Eagle Pass/Carrizo Springs) – 30 miles east-southeast of Eagle Pass – 28°37′33″N 100°03′33″W
- US 377 north (Del Rio) – 25 miles north of Del Rio on U.S. Route 377 – 29°42′48″N 100°49′46″W
- US 90 east (Brackettville/Uvalde) – 60 miles east of Del Rio – 29°12′58″N 99°56′33″W
- US 57 north – 11 miles east of Eagle Pass on U.S. Route 57 – 28°47′50″N 100°22′05″W
- US 83 north – 35 miles north of Laredo – 27°59′13″N 99°31′39″W
- I-35 north – 29 miles north of Laredo – 27°54′18″N 99°23′38″W
- US 59 east (Freer) – 16 miles west of Freer (Note: U.S. 59 is planned to be co-signed with I-69W from the Mexico–U.S. border in Laredo to Victoria.) – 27°46′27″N 98°50′44″W
- SH 359 east (Oilton) – Six miles east of Oilton – 27°26′36″N 98°53′15″W
- SH 16 north (Hebbronville) – One mile south of Hebbronville – 27°16′59″N 98°41′36″W
- FM 1017 north (Hebbronville #2) – 50 yards south on FM 1017 at "T" intersection of State Highway 285. – 27°17′48″N 98°39′47″W
- US 281 north (Falfurrias) – 14 miles south of Falfurrias (Note: U.S. 281 is planned to be co-signed with I-69C from Pharr to George West.) – 27°01′30″N 98°08′18″W (See Brooks County, Texas.)
- US 77 north (Sarita) – 14 miles south of Sarita (Note: U.S. 77 is planned to be co-signed with I-69E from the Mexico–U.S. border in Brownsville to Victoria.) – 27°00′58″N 97°47′39″W
- SH 4 west (Brownsville) – On Boca Chica Highway (SH 4) leading away from Boca Chica Beach – 25°55′25″N 97°22′19″W

== Tactical checkpoints ==
In fiscal year 2008, thirty-nine tactical checkpoints were in operation. Tactical checkpoints lack permanent buildings, and "support permanent checkpoints by monitoring and inspecting traffic on secondary roads that the Border Patrol determined are likely to be used by individuals in the country illegally or smugglers to evade apprehension at permanent checkpoints". A tactical checkpoint might consist of vehicles, traffic cones, signs, a portable water supply, a cage for canines (if deployed), and portable rest facilities.

Due to Congressional restrictions against the funding of permanent checkpoints in the Tucson sector, all of its checkpoints are tactical checkpoints. These were required to relocate every seven days, amended to every 14 days in 2005. Due to the need for road shoulder space and restrictions on placing checkpoints near curves, the number of sites is limited, and the relocation in practice means that checkpoints are periodically shut down. In 2005, the median tactical checkpoint nationally was active for 2 hours daily, as opposed to over 23 hours daily for permanent checkpoints; however, the Tucson sector's checkpoint on Interstate 19 was active 22 hours daily. A draft plan for the I-19 checkpoint in 2009 proposed to model it on the largest previous permanent checkpoint, the I-35 checkpoint north of Laredo, Texas, but would surpass it in size (18 acres) and inspection lanes (8 primary, 7 secondary). Several community concerns were addressed, such as placement of canopies for dark sky restrictions for a local observatory, off-highway location, rumble strips, signage, and mitigation of traffic congestion. A community recommendation to "seek to mitigate noise" was to be "researched and considered".

== Effectiveness and criticisms ==
=== Benefits ===
For the year 2008, a GAO report entitled "Border Patrol" assigned mixed success to border checkpoints. Positive results include the apprehension of nearly 17,000 people in the country illegally at interior checkpoints. The report also said, "More than 705,000 total Border Patrol apprehensions [occurred] along the southwest border ... ." The Border Patrol also "encountered 530 aliens from special interest countries, which are countries the Department of State has determined to represent a potential terrorist threat to the United States." Additionally, there were over 3,500 drug seizures at southwest border checkpoints in 2008.

=== Changes in 2008 ===
Staffing levels were substantially increased in 2008. The Laredo sector, for instance, increased its number of agents from 1200 in 2007 to approximately 1636 in 2008. Upgraded infrastructure and technology increased deterrence and detection capability in the Laredo sector. Additions include cameras, license plate readers, and vehicle and cargo inspection systems (VACIS). Laredo also implemented a prosecution initiative in 2008. Named Operation Streamline, the goal was "to prosecute and remove all violators charged with illegal entry in target areas in the sector".

=== Shortcomings ===
A shortcoming cited by the same GAO report was the inaccuracies represented by the report's title. The report states, "Our analysis showed that the actual checkpoint performance results were incorrectly reported for two of the three measures in fiscal year 2007 and for one measure in fiscal year 2008. As a result, the Border Patrol incorrectly reported that it met its checkpoint performance targets for these two measures."

An analysis of the aforementioned GAO report criticized Border Patrol for its ineffective non-border checkpoints vs. actual border crossings. It stated, "There were 704,000 interdictions at actual border crossings in 2008; however, there were only 17,000 interdictions at internal non-border checkpoints. This 17,000 figure represents 2.4% of interdictions, but it took 4% of agents to accomplish this goal." The analysis further states regarding the Tucson sector that, "Actual border interdictions numbered 320,000, but internal non-border checkpoint interdictions numbered 1,800. This means the number of interdictions per agent at the actual border was 116, but the number of interdictions per agent at internal non-border checkpoints was only 8." The analysis finally questions why the stated goal of DHS "is to detect and apprehend 30% of major illegal activity [at the border]." It asked why 70% of illegal activity is conceded at the actual border. Some residents of Arivaca, Arizona have stated they are regularly subjected to harassment, delays, searches, and racial profiling at the internal checkpoint near their community. They questioned the effectiveness of the checkpoint and began monitoring it in 2014 to determine its effectiveness.

=== Constitutionality ===
Internal checkpoints have also been criticized for violating the Fourth Amendment to the United States Constitution, which prohibits "unreasonable searches and seizures", although United States v. Martinez-Fuerte has affirmed their constitutionality. The U.S. Border Patrol has stated: "Although motorists are not legally required to answer the questions 'Are you a U.S. citizen, and where are you headed?' they will not be allowed to proceed until the inspecting agent is satisfied that the occupants of vehicles traveling through the checkpoint are legally present in the U.S."

== Popular culture ==
- Missing in Brooks County is a feature-length documentary that examines the deaths in Brooks County, Texas of migrants seeking to avoid the U.S. Border Patrol interior checkpoint in Falfurrias. The film has won numerous awards after its presentation at movie festivals. As of November 2021, it holds a 100% rating on Rotten Tomatoes. It was released for streaming on November 2, 2021, and shown in selected theaters. It was shown on PBS's Independent Lens series in January 2022.

== See also ==
- Freedom of movement under United States law
- Border zone
- Immigrant warning sign
- Michigan Department of State Police v. Sitz
- Visible Intermodal Prevention and Response team
