= City of Indianapolis v. Edmond =

- Supreme Court of the United States

Argued October 3, 2000 Decided November 28, 2000
- Full case name: City of Indianapolis, et al. v. James Edmond, et al.
- Citations: 531 U.S. 32 (more) 121 S. Ct. 447; 148 L. Ed. 2d 333; 2000 U.S. LEXIS 8084; 69 U.S.L.W. 4009; 2000 Cal. Daily Op. Service 9549; 2000 Colo. J. C.A.R. 6401; 14 Fla. L. Weekly Fed. S 9

Case history
- Prior: Edmond v. Goldsmith, 38 F. Supp. 2d 1016 (S.D. Ind. 1998), reversed, 183 F.3d 659 (7th Cir. 1999); cert. granted, 528 U.S. 1153 (2000).

Holding
- Police may not conduct roadblocks "whose primary purpose is to detect evidence of ordinary criminal wrongdoing." Such roadblocks must have a specific primary purpose, such as keeping roadways safe from impaired drivers, or enforcing border security.

Court membership
- Chief Justice William Rehnquist Associate Justices John P. Stevens · Sandra Day O'Connor; Antonin Scalia · Anthony Kennedy; David Souter · Clarence Thomas; Ruth Bader Ginsburg · Stephen Breyer

Case opinions
- Majority: O'Connor, joined by Stevens, Kennedy, Souter, Ginsburg, Breyer
- Dissent: Rehnquist, joined by Thomas; Scalia (only as to Part I)
- Dissent: Thomas

Laws applied
- U.S. Const. amend. IV

City of Indianapolis v. Edmond, 531 U.S. 32 (2000), was a United States Supreme Court case in which the Court held, 6–3, that police may not conduct vehicle searches, specifically ones involving drug-sniffing police dogs, at a checkpoint or roadblock without reasonable suspicion. In the case, the Indianapolis Police Department was conducting warrantless searches of vehicles, without individualized suspicion, for the purpose of "general crime control". Previous Supreme Court decisions had given the police power to create roadblocks for the purposes of border security (United States v. Martinez-Fuerte) and removing drunk drivers from the road (Police v. Sitz), but in this decision, the Court limited police power, holding that the search can only occur if it was designed to serve special needs, beyond the normal need for law enforcement.

== Background ==
In August 1998, the Indianapolis Police Department set up six roadblocks on roads and highways in and out of the city of Indianapolis in an effort to disrupt unlawful trafficking of narcotics. The location of these roadblocks were chosen weeks in advance based on an area's crime rate and the road's general traffic flow. On written directions from the chief of police, one officer was to approach each stopped vehicle and conduct an "open-view" search of the vehicle, while another walked a narcotics-sniffing dog around the vehicle. If the dog alerted to the presence of narcotics, the vehicle would be searched by the police. A predetermined number of vehicles were stopped at each roadblock, and each stop was to take five minutes or less. Checkpoints were operated during daylight hours, and marked with lighted signs that read, "NARCOTICS CHECKPOINT __ MILE AHEAD, NARCOTICS K-9 IN USE, BE PREPARED TO STOP." Between August and November, the police stopped 1,161 motorists, and arrested 104, of which 55 were charged with drug-related crimes.

James Edmond and Joell Palmer were both stopped at one of these checkpoints, and filed a class action lawsuit against the city, representing "any and all persons driving vehicles who have been stopped [...] at the drug interdiction roadblocks maintained by the City of Indianapolis."

== Opinion of the Court ==
The opinion was delivered by Justice Sandra Day O'Connor, joined by Justices John Paul Stevens, Anthony Kennedy, David Souter, Ruth Bader Ginsburg, and Stephen Breyer.

Chief Justice William Rehnquist delivered a dissenting opinion, in which Justice Clarence Thomas joined, and Justice Antonin Scalia joined as to part I. Justice Thomas also filed a separate dissent.

== See also ==
- List of United States Supreme Court cases, volume 531
- United States v. Martinez-Fuerte (1976)
- Michigan Dept. of State Police v. Sitz (1990)
- Illinois v. Lidster (2004)
