= Roadblock =

Installation set up to block traffic on a road

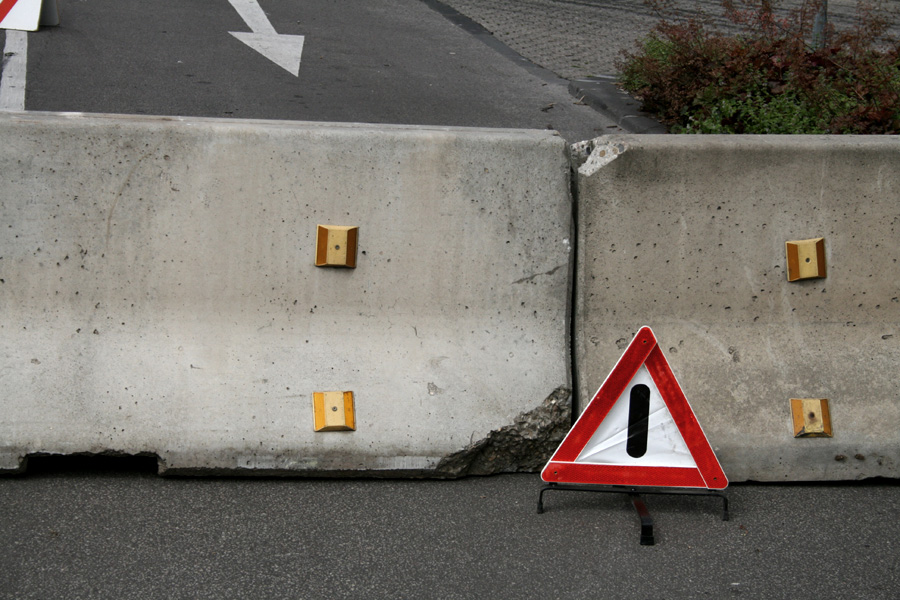
Concrete barrier

A roadblock is a temporary installation set up to control or block traffic along a road. The reasons for one could be:

- Roadworks
- Temporary road closure during special events
- Police chase
- Robbery
- Sobriety checkpoint
- Protests

In peaceful circumstances, they are usually installed by the police or road transport authorities; they are also commonly employed during wars and are usually staffed by heavily armed soldiers in that case. During protests and riots, both police and demonstrators sometimes use roadblocks.

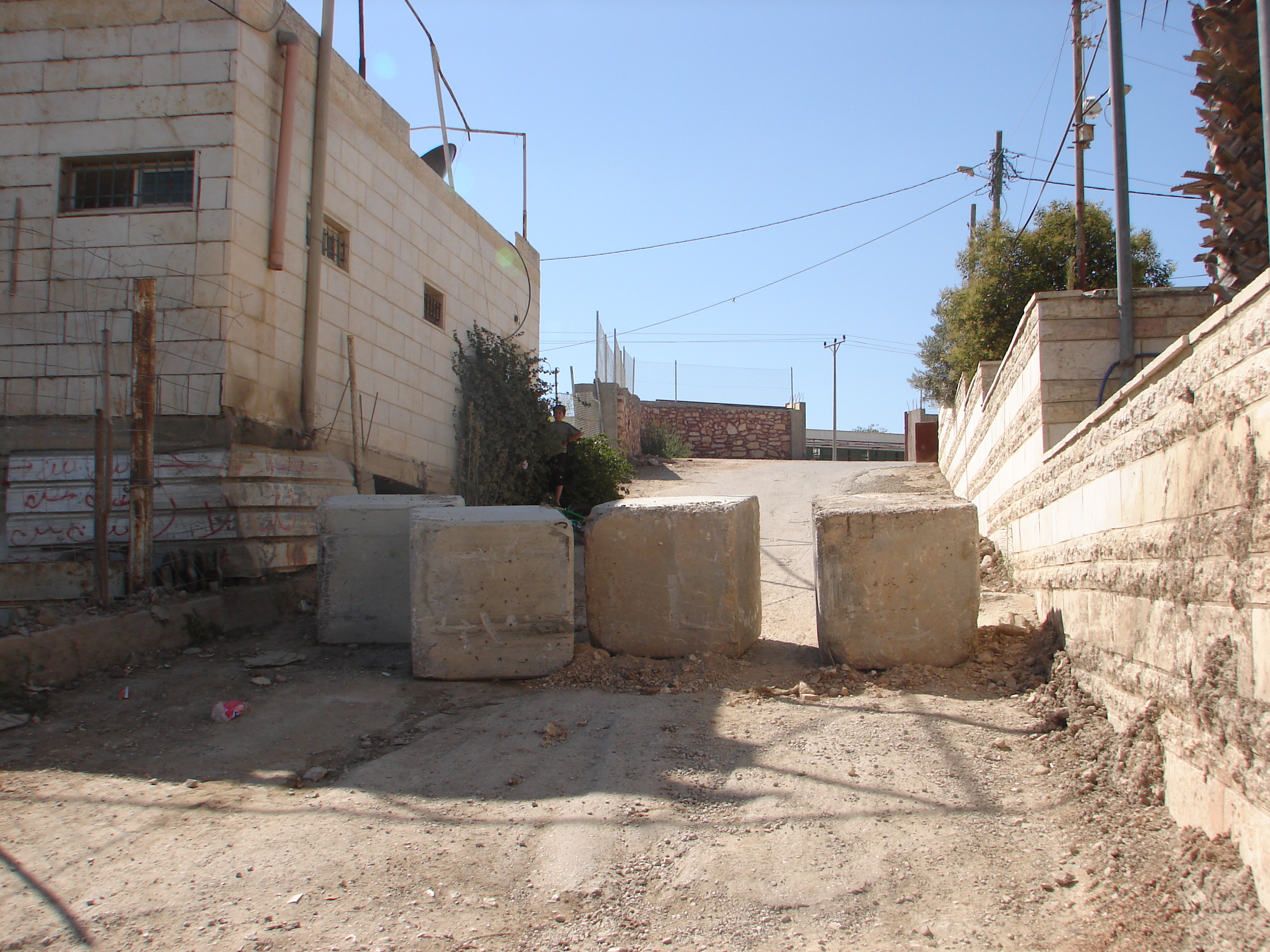
Roadblock in the West Bank

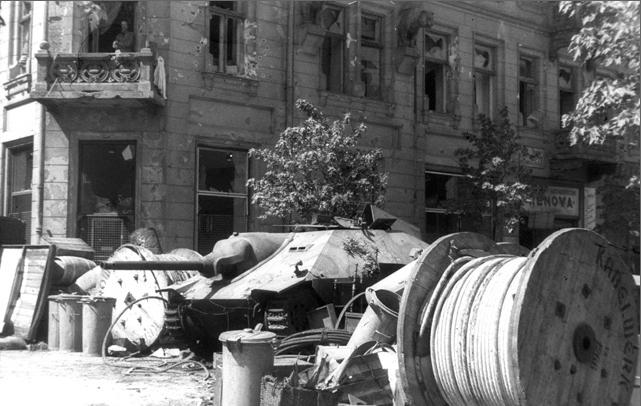
Polish barricade during the Warsaw Uprising (1944)

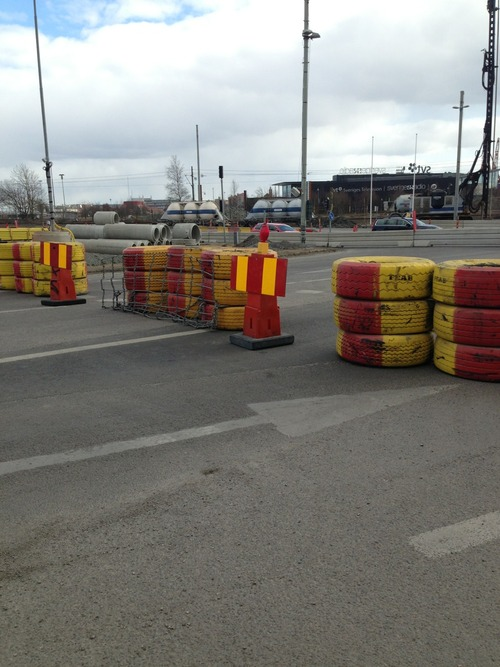
Roadblock during roadworks at Hisingen, Sweden, 2013

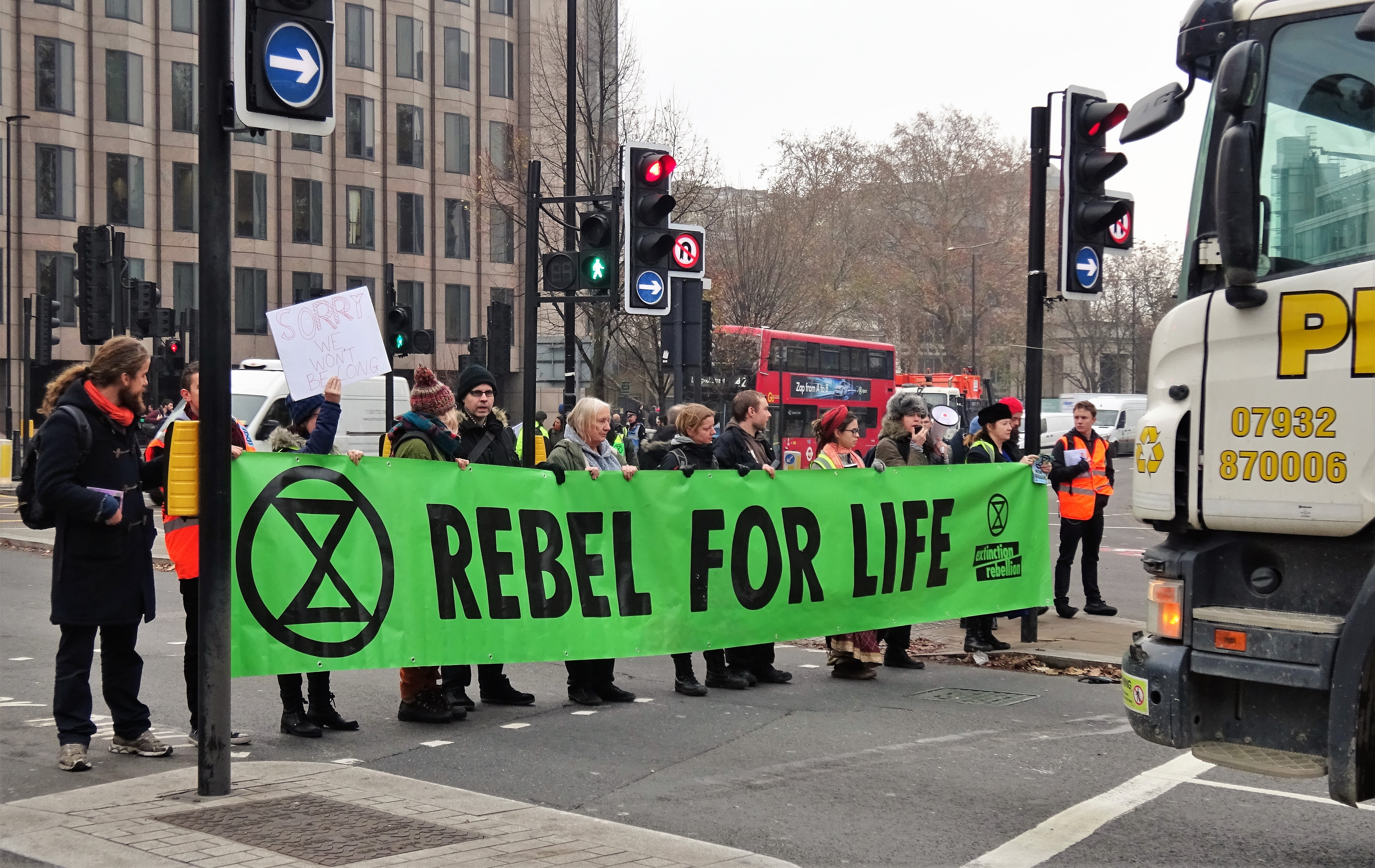
'Swarming roadblocks' Extinction Rebellion, (UK) (23 November 2018).

== See also ==
- Road traffic control
- Barricade
- Boom barrier
- Braess's paradox
- Illinois v. Lidster
- Safety barrier
- Traffic break
