= Saturation patrol =

Location-specific tactic used by police and military forces

A saturation patrol is a police or military patrol tactic wherein a large number of officers are concentrated into a small geographic area. Saturation patrols are used for hot-spot crime reduction, DUI checkpoints, and other location-specific patrols. The methodology employs overwhelming force presence, via large concentration of patrol officers, to create a real or perceived omnipresence, in the hopes that it deters crime inside and outside the actual patrol location. Authorities also use them because of riots and riot officers together with horses or dogs can assist.

== See also ==
- Random checkpoint
- Force concentration
- Patrol
- Riot police
