= Reduce Impaired Driving Everywhere =

Reduce Impaired Driving Everywhere or RIDE is a sobriety testing program used by police in Ontario, Canada. The program began in 1977 as Reduce Impaired Driving in Etobicoke and the success of the program led to the expansion across the province of Ontario. (Etobicoke is a suburb within the metropolitan city of Toronto, Ontario).

The roadside spot-checks usually appear during the holidays to catch drunk drivers, but the program lasts year round. Volunteers are also enlisted to participate in the program. Officers from participating police forces are usually members of traffic and auxiliary units.

Police roadside spot-checks are set up on major roadways and off-ramps of highways. All drivers are stopped and interrogated upon reaching the checkpoint. If a driver is suspected to be intoxicated, the officer may request a roadside breathalyzer test. Drivers are also provided a pamphlet detailing the program.

Spot checks usually consist of several cruisers and pylons to direct cars into the area. Trailers are used to conduct breathalyzer testing. Tow trucks may be on standby to remove any vehicles with drivers caught drunk.

In 1985, the program was challenged as a violation of the Canadian Charter of Rights and Freedoms. The Supreme Court of Canada ruled that the random roadside checks do not violate the Charter as long as they are carried out for the purposes of the R.I.D.E. program only. Police officers may not use R.I.D.E. stops as the basis for any other investigation.

== See also ==
- Mothers Against Drunk Driving
- Sobriety checkpoint (Sobriety checkpoint in PA) - used in jurisdictions outside of Canada
