= Michigan State Police =

American law-enforcement agency

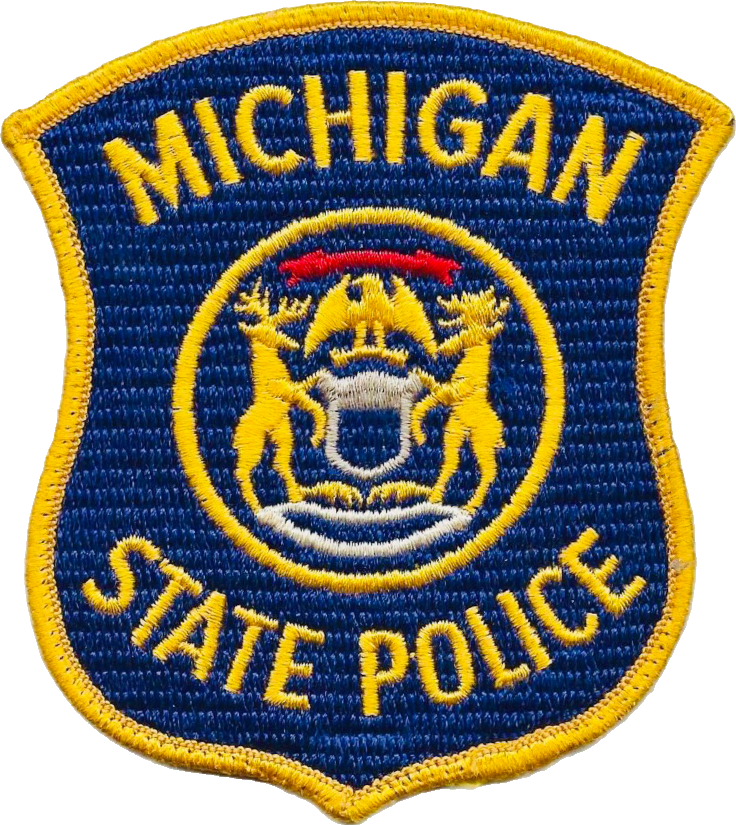
- Shoulder Patch

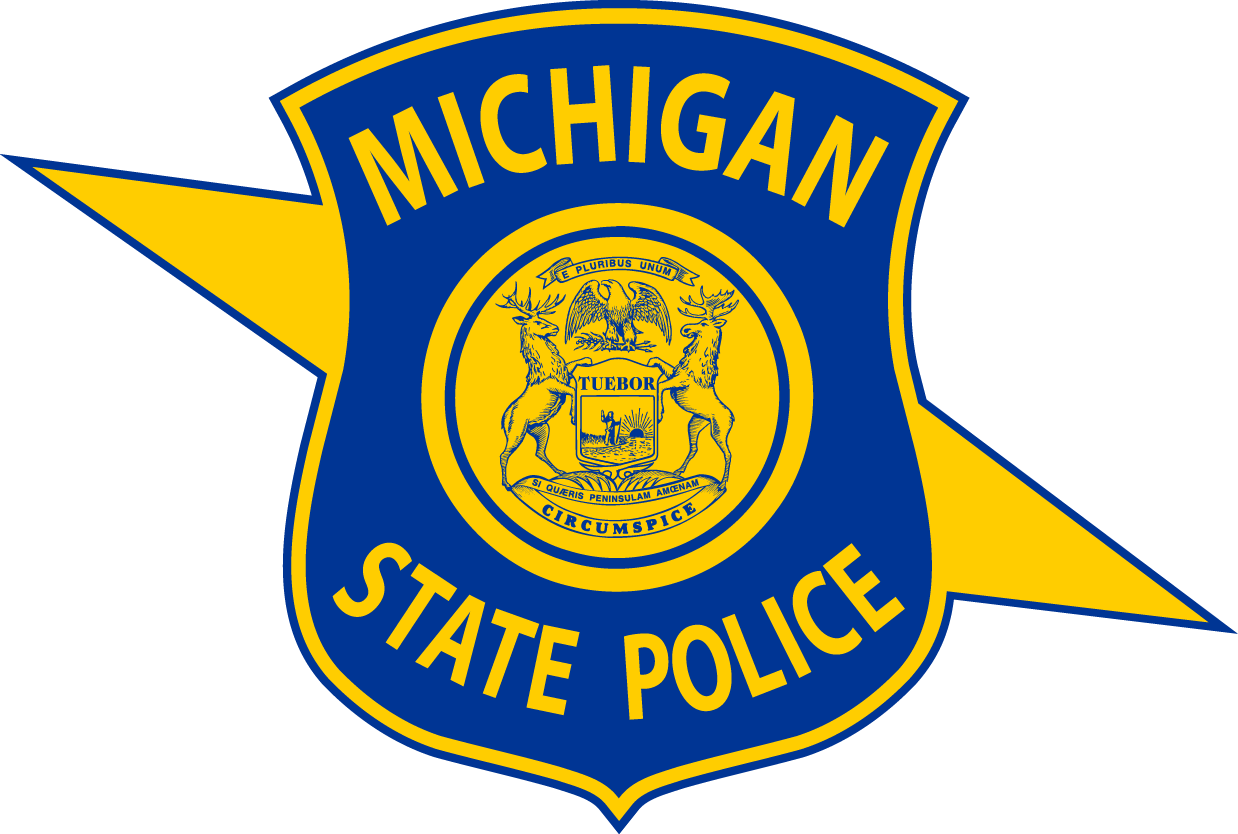
- Door Seal

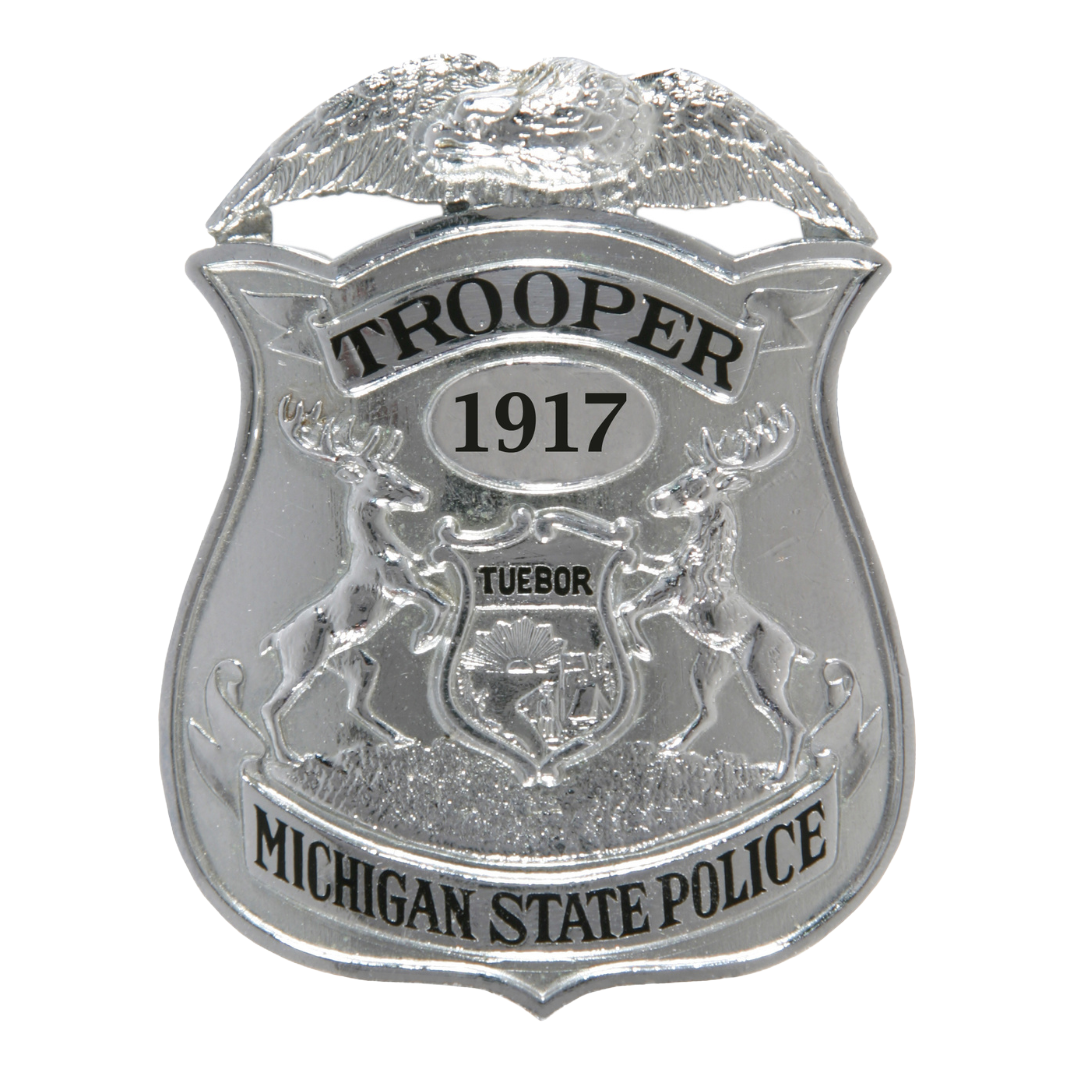
- Trooper Badge

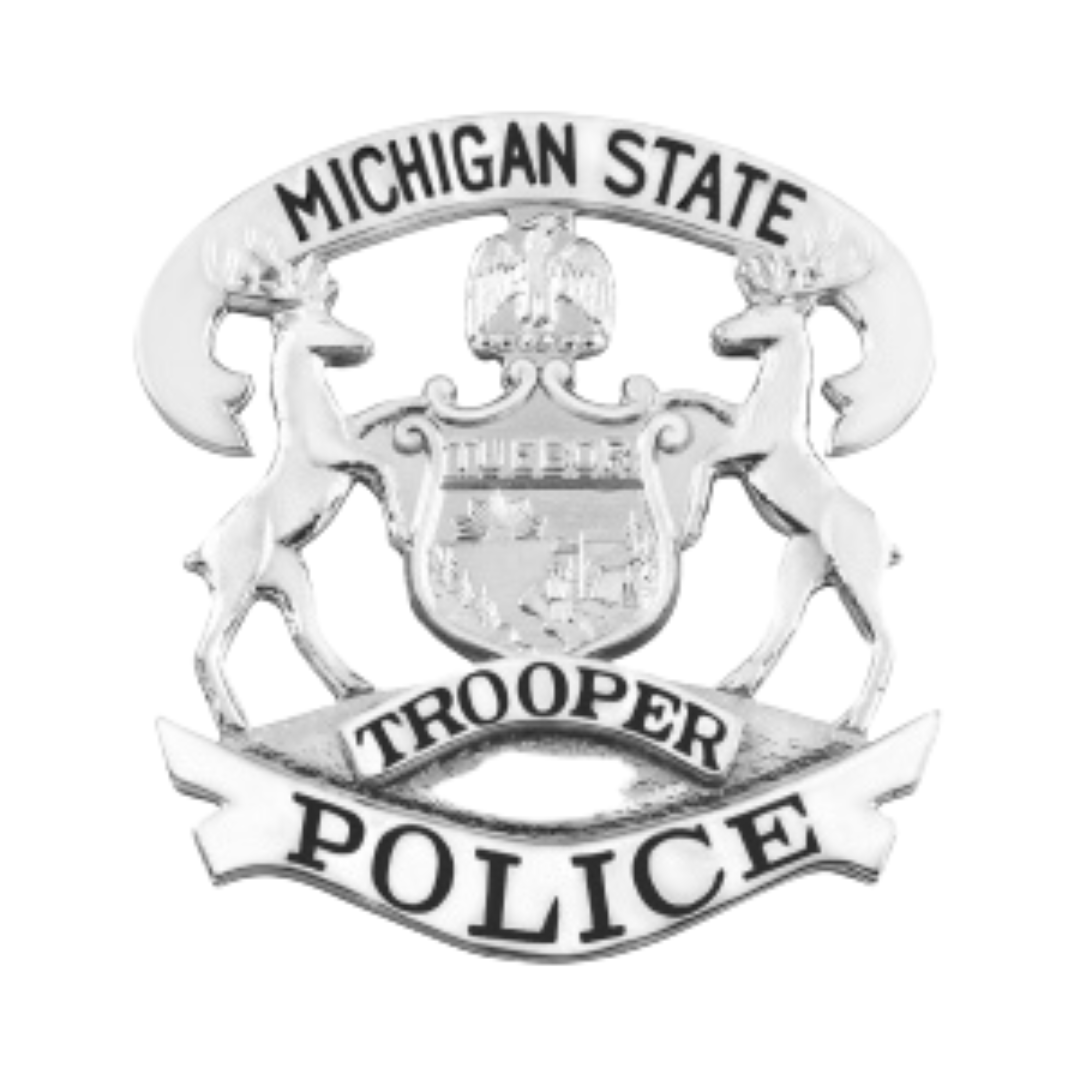
- Michigan State Police Hat Badge
- Abbreviation: MSP

Agency overview
- Formed: April 19, 1917; 109 years ago
- Employees: 3,849
- Annual budget: $992,034,300 (2025-2026)

Jurisdictional structure
- Operations jurisdiction: Michigan, U.S.
- Area: 97,990 square miles (253,800 km^{2})
- Population: 9,969,727 (2022 est.)
- Legal jurisdiction: (Michigan) statewide
- General nature: Civilian police

Operational structure
- Headquarters: 7150 Harris Dr. Dimondale, Michigan 48821
- Trooper and Motor Carrier Officers: 1,875 (actual, as of June 2024)
- Civilian/Non sworn members: 1,060
- Agency executive: Colonel James Grady, II, Director
- Districts: 7

Facilities
- Posts: 31

Website
- michigan.gov/msp

The Michigan State Police (MSP) is the state police agency for the U.S. state of Michigan. The MSP is a full-service law enforcement agency, with its sworn members having full police powers statewide.

The department was founded in 1917 as a wartime constabulary (originally named the Michigan State Troops Permanent Force) and eventually evolved into the modern agency that it is today. The department's entry-level members are called "Recruits", who eventually earn the title of "Trooper". Its headquarters is in Dimondale, Michigan.

== History ==
The Michigan Department of State Police began as a temporary, wartime emergency force for the purpose of domestic security during World War I. On April 19, 1917, Governor Albert Sleeper created the Michigan State Troops Permanent Force, also known as the Michigan State Constabulary. With Colonel Roy C. Vandercook as the first commanding officer, this new force consisted of five Troops of mounted, dismounted and motorized units, totaling 300 men. With Michigan going "dry", enacting state liquor prohibition effective May 1, 1918, and Ohio "wet", the force was soon stationed in Monroe County by 1918 due to the smuggling going on. On March 26, 1919, Public Act 26 reorganized the Constabulary as the permanent, peacetime Michigan State Police.

Throughout the history of the department, its members have participated in many historical events. Some of the earliest duties of the department involved strike breaking, with troopers being dispatched on horseback to the iron-rich regions of the state's Upper Peninsula to guarantee the mining and distribution of the vital ore by forceably disrupting labor organizing efforts.

A Bureau of Investigation and Identification was started by Capt. Ira H. Marmon opened in 1919 at the East Lansing Headquarters with an old shoebox fingerprint records file previous kept under his barracks cot next to his desk.

In the mid-1970s Michigan Governor William Milliken gave the Michigan State Police a permanent presence on Detroit area freeways which culminated in the opening of the Detroit Freeway post in Downtown Detroit. This action was taken after a rash of crimes on the Detroit area freeway system and local law enforcement had limited resources in doing expressway patrols on a regular basis. MSP troopers were deployed in Benton Harbor in the summer of 2003 to quell civil unrest that was occurring within that city.

Troopers were also deployed to Louisiana in September 2005 following Hurricane Katrina to assist local authorities with search and rescue, law enforcement, and humanitarian efforts in the devastated city of New Orleans, Louisiana. In January and February 2006, the Michigan State Police deployed several hundred Troopers to Detroit during Super Bowl XL and worked with local and federal agencies to ensure a safe environment for the game and its related festivities.

The summers of 1987 and 2007 saw a major mobilization of departmental resources for the National Governors' Conference in Traverse City. The state police were also requested to assist local police agencies with patrol support in the cities of Flint and Saginaw; a similar request was made in February 2008 by the city of Pontiac after budget difficulties forced the cash-strapped city to lay off many police officers.

In 2017, the MSP went from the garrison style cap to a navy blue straw "Smokey" campaign hat as part of their uniform. In July 2018, the MSP switched back to the garrison style cap after most troopers voted to switch back to the old hat.

=== 2011 Redistricting ===
On October 1, 2011, in an effort to achieve its $17.7 million general fund reduction for fiscal year 2012, the department's districts were realigned and the number of posts was reduced from 62 to 29. In total, 18 posts were converted to detachments (private auxiliary offices for other posts) and 14 posts were closed; however, no MSP employees were laid off. The number of posts increased to 30 in December 2016, when the Metro South post reopened in Taylor, a suburb of Detroit. In 2023, the Traverse City post reopened, bringing the total number of posts to 31.

== Duties ==
Troopers with the Michigan State Police are entrusted with the authority to conduct investigations concerning violations of criminal and traffic statutes throughout the state and answer service calls regardless of city, township, or county boundaries.

== Department overview ==
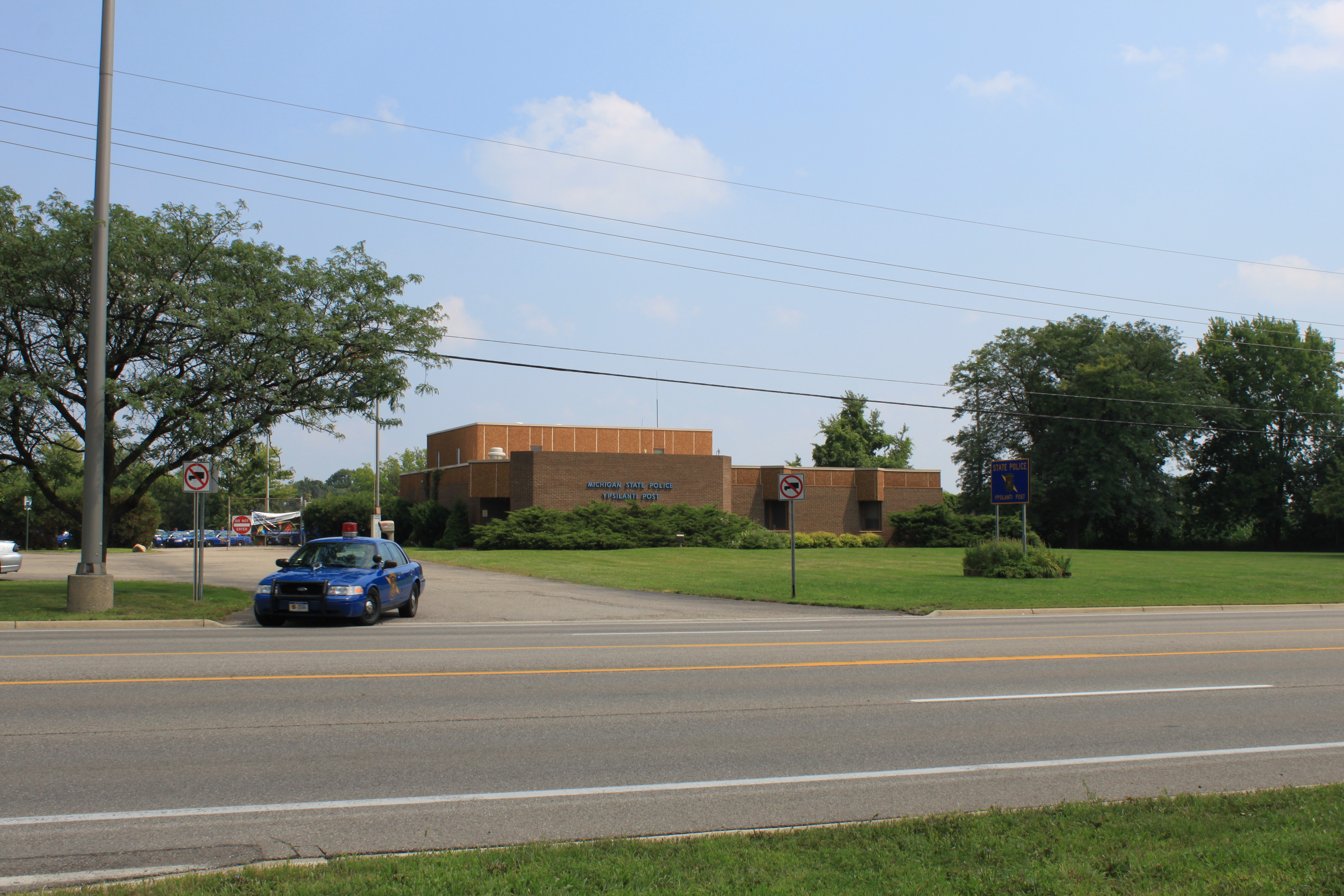
Michigan State Police, Ypsilanti Post. The Ypsilanti Post was merged into the Brighton Post in 2011.

The Michigan State Police (MSP) is a full-service law enforcement agency, with approximately 3,000 employees who provide over 60 different services either directly to Michigan residents or in support of other law enforcement agencies. The MSP personnel most visible to the public are the uniform troopers of the Field Services Bureau whose primary responsibilities include investigating crimes, deterring criminal activity, apprehending criminals and fugitives, conducting traffic enforcement to increase traffic safety, and participating in community outreach and prevention services activities. The MSP also has a cadre of highly trained detectives who conduct investigations in specialized fields such as homicides, fraud, felonious assault, computer crimes, fire investigation and criminal sexual conduct.

The MSP has a variety of specialized teams that each receive advanced training and equipment and are available to provide direct service or to assist other law enforcement agencies. These teams include the Bomb Squad, Canine Unit, Marine Services Team, Aviation Unit, Emergency Support Team, Motor Unit and Tactical Bike Team. The MSP also provides leadership for over 20 multijurisdictional teams in areas including narcotics, auto theft, computer crimes and cold cases. In addition, MSP motor carrier officers perform commercial motor vehicle enforcement and truck safety initiatives statewide.

The MSP provides 24-hour, forensic science services from seven regional laboratories to all police agencies in the state. Each laboratory meets the Federal Bureau of Investigation’s Quality Assurance Standards and is accredited by the American National Standards Institute-American Society of Quality (ANSI-ASQ) National Accreditation Board.

The MSP is the repository for criminal justice records including criminal history records, traffic crash records, firearms records, concealed pistol registrations, sex offender registry, missing persons, stolen property, mug shots and fingerprints. The department makes use of Michigan Residents Directory Database and other similar public records meant for the state. The department also administers the Law Enforcement Information Network (LEIN) to provide criminal justice agencies access to this information. In addition, the MSP uses Michigan Incident Crime Reporting to prepare the annual Uniform Crime Report that provides both a local-level and statewide description of crime in Michigan.

Michigan’s Homeland Security Advisor is the Michigan State Police Director, who is responsible for protecting Michigan’s citizens, its critical infrastructure and key resources, and responding to attacks, incidents and natural disasters that occur in Michigan. The State Emergency Operations Center (SEOC) is managed and maintained by the Michigan State Police, Emergency Management and Homeland Security Division. The SEOC is responsible for facilitating the coordination of all state agency activities and resources during an emergency or disaster ensuring an effective and efficient state response. During activation of the SEOC, personnel monitor ongoing incidents, communicate with affected jurisdictions and government agencies, as well as assess and coordinate any requests for state resources or assistance. The SEOC is typically staffed by state agency personnel, nonprofit organizations, as well as members of the private sector affected by the incident. The Governor is kept informed of state response and recovery activities from the SEOC.

In addition to helping local governments plan and prepare for both man-made and natural disasters, the MSP coordinates state and federal resources to assist local jurisdictions with response and relief activities in the event of an emergency or disaster. The MSP coordinates all state-level homeland security initiatives and serves as the State Administrative Agency for federal homeland security grants.

The MSP Training Academy located in Dimondale provides learning opportunities and training programs for both MSP employees and the broader criminal justice community in areas such as leadership development, narcotics investigation, pursuit driving, first aid, marksmanship and Michigan law. The MSP’s Precision Driving Unit is internationally recognized for its annual Police Vehicle Evaluation program.

Agencies housed within the MSP include the Auto Theft Prevention Authority, Michigan Commission on Law Enforcement Standards and Michigan Office of Highway Safety Planning.

== Patrol vehicles ==
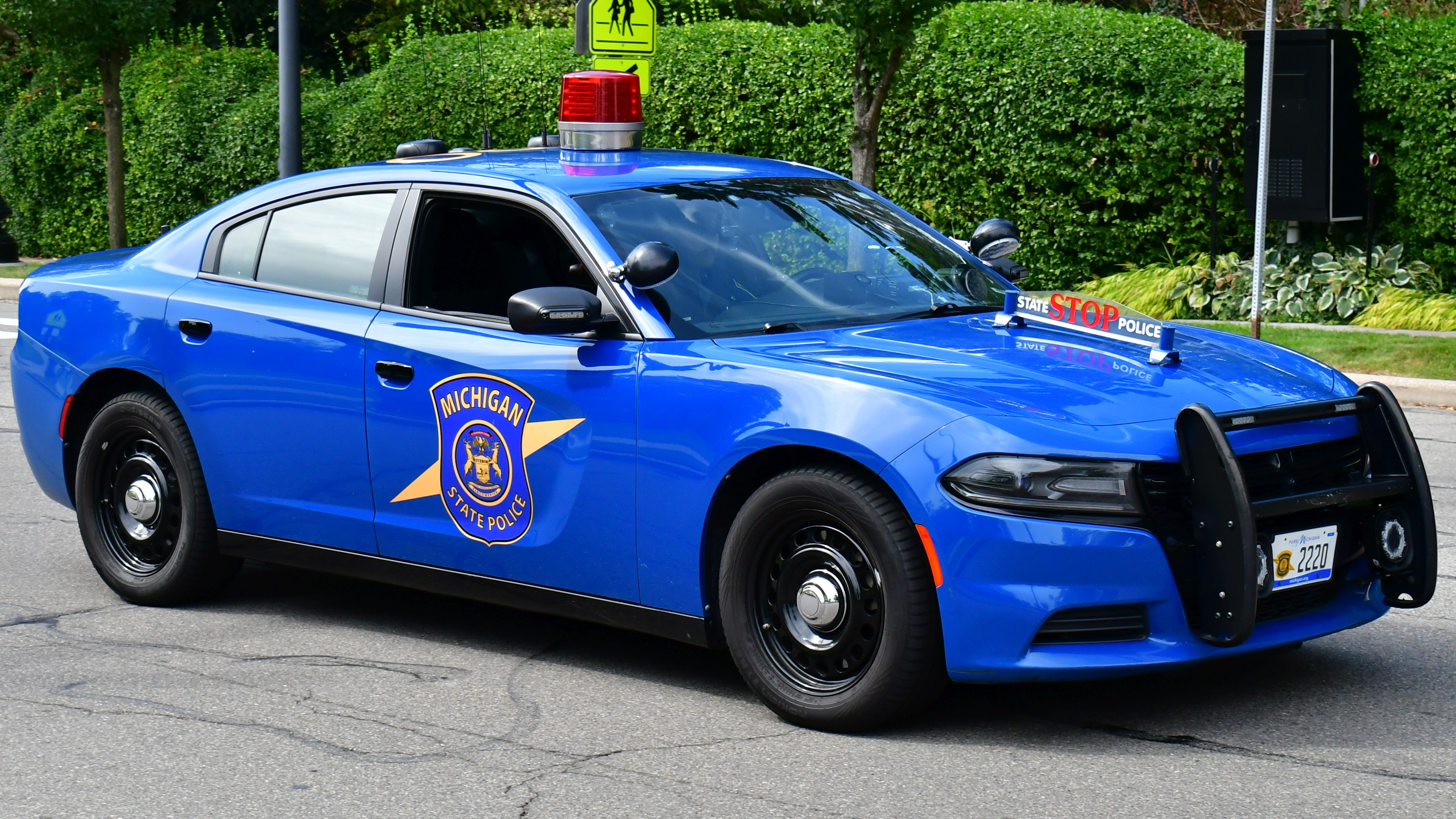
Dodge Charger in standard livery

MSP's standard patrol cars are distinctive in style among U.S. police agencies. They are painted bright blue, with the agency's seal printed on the front doors, and feature a single large red light on the roof, a design which was once common among U.S. police agencies, but is now largely unique to MSP. Among officers, a patrol car of this design is often colloquially called a "blue goose".

The MSP also use "slicktop" vehicles, without the large red light, for traffic enforcement; some vehicles of this design are also painted blue, while others are painted in other colors.

The bulk of the department's current patrol fleet consists of the Dodge Charger, the Ford Police Interceptor Utility, the Chevrolet Tahoe, and the Dodge Durango. MSP also deploys troopers on Harley Davidson and BMW R1200RT-P motorcycles. Several other varieties of vehicles, including Chevrolet Suburbans and Impalas, are used by the department's specialized divisions.

The Ford Crown Victoria Police Interceptor, once a mainstay of the fleet, was retired from service in the 2010s.

=== Paint color and marking styles ===
The distinctive blue paint color used on Michigan State Police vehicles is one of the few colors that manufacturers add to their color palettes specifically for a police agency. The MSP specify the hue as Dulux 93-032, though automakers have their own internal designations for the color.

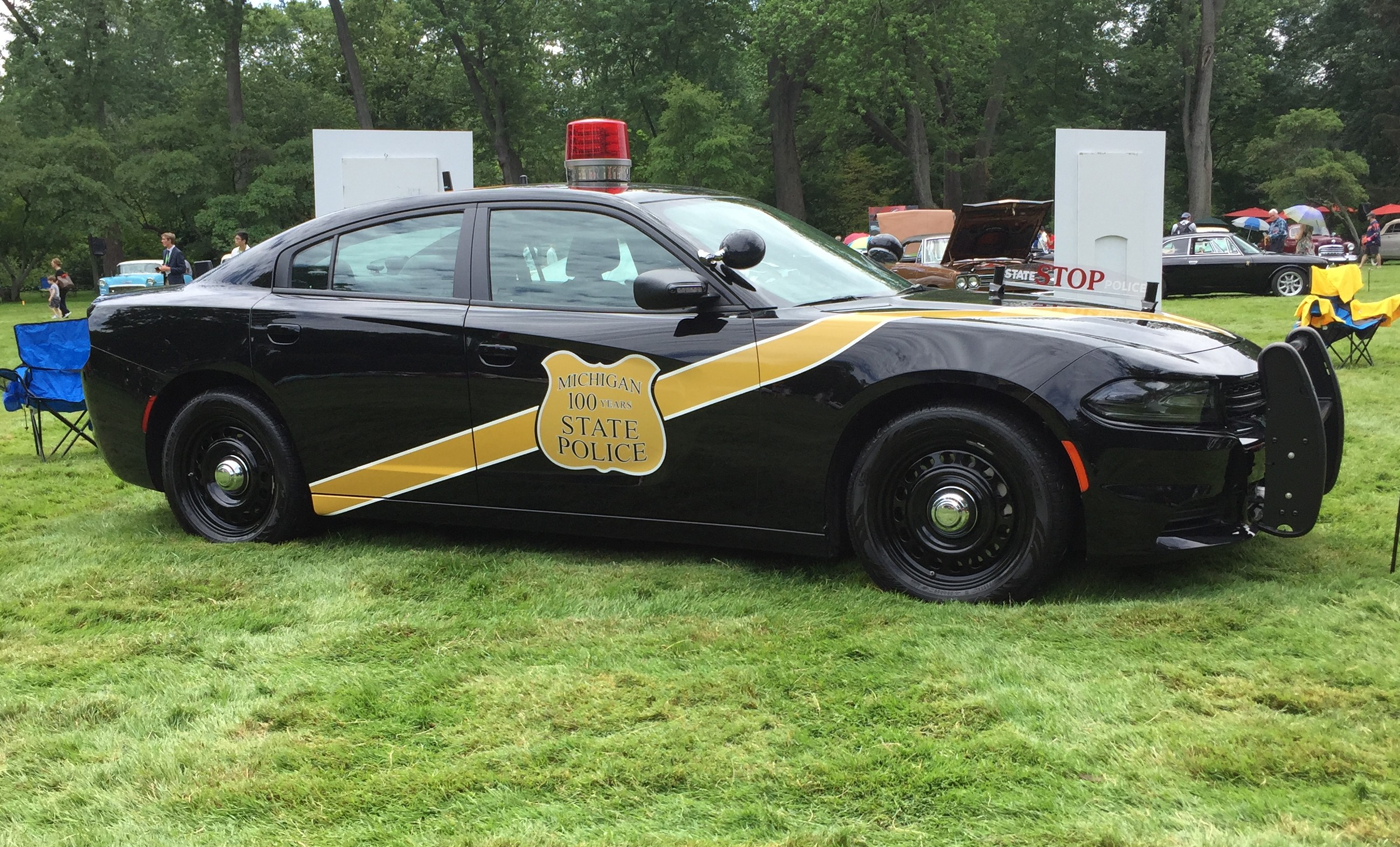
Dodge Charger in 100th anniversary livery

In 2017, MSP purchased 50 patrol cars in a previous black-and-gold livery to commemorate the department's 100th anniversary.

Vehicles used by the Commercial Vehicle Enforcement Division (CVED) are identical to standard State Police vehicles, but are printed with the words "Commercial Vehicle Enforcement" below the rear window. Prior to 2008, MSP's motor carrier enforcement vehicles featured a special seal and other "motor carrier" markings.

=== Unique lighting ===
The rotating red light has been used by the MSP since the 1950s and the current style red overhead light has been in use by the agency since 1979. Fully marked patrol vehicles feature a single red overhead light, the RV-26 or RV-46 "Spitfire" made by Unity. In mid to late 2023 they announced a new gumball light by Sound Off Signals Manufacturing that rotates when activated. In late 2009, MSP announced that these are being retrofitted with red LED lamps rather than incandescent beams to reduce the hassle and expense of replacing the PAR 36 or PAR 46, 60,000 CP sealed beam bulbs and servicing the rotor motors. Red lenses on some MSP vehicle roof beacons have one or two clear horizontal stripes that allow some white light to shine through, giving the lamps a pinkish glow at long distances. Michigan State Police have continued to use the "gumball" style lights instead of lightbars, claiming they are unique, reduce wind drag, and are highly visible at long distances.

Patrol units also incorporate flashing red and blue lights on their rear bumpers, front push bumpers, and side mirrors, as well as headlight and tail light flashers.

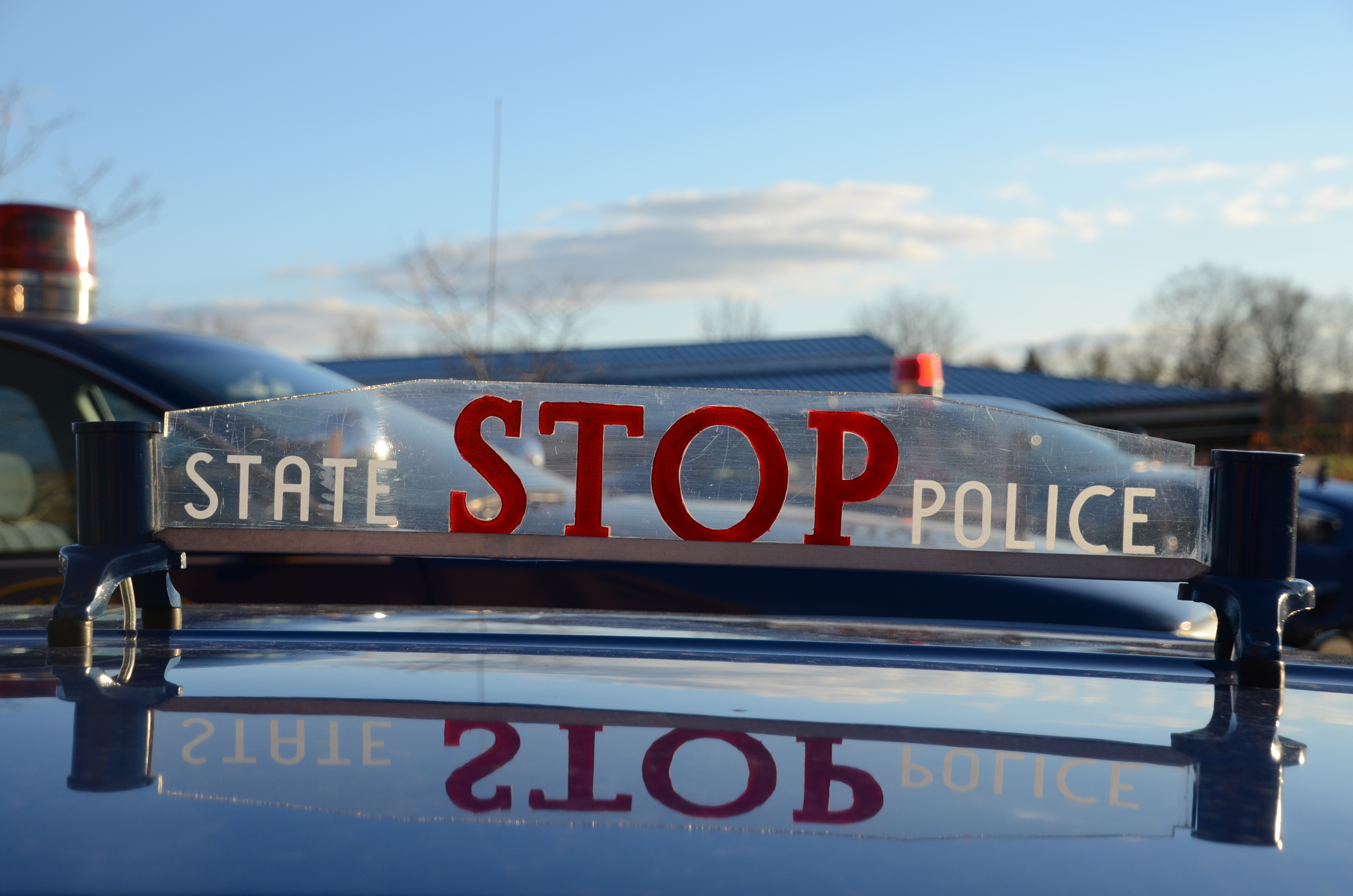
"Side stop" sign on the hood of an MSP patrol car

Most MSP vehicles also feature a clear plastic sign on their hoods, printed with the words "State Police" and "stop". This sign, often known as a "hood light", "hailer", or "shark fin", was historically used to initiate traffic stops, in which a trooper would illuminate the lighted sign to signal a motorist to pull over, or to signal a road blockade. The MSP no longer conduct "side stops" in this manner, but retain the sign on their vehicles out of tradition.

=== Vehicle testing ===
Since 1975, the MSP have conducted an extensive annual evaluation of police vehicles available in the U.S. market. The results of these evaluations are published on the agency's website, and often influence the purchasing decisions of other law enforcement agencies. Findings and suggestions from the MSP evaluation are also used by Ford, General Motors, and Stellantis to develop their police vehicles.

Top speed and braking tests are usually held each fall at the Chrysler Proving Grounds near Chelsea, and vehicle dynamics and handling tests are conducted two days later at Grattan Raceway in Grattan Township. Tests are open to members of the law enforcement community, fleet managers, and other interested parties.

The MSP are one of two U.S. police departments (the other being the Los Angeles County Sheriff's Department) which conduct such an extensive series of tests.

=== Aviation Unit ===
The five aircraft in the Michigan State Police Aviation Unit are assigned several duties:

- search and rescue
- relays
- traffic enforcement
- traffic control
- security
- training
- investigative and administrative flights

=== Mobile Command Vehicle ===
The Michigan State Police operates one Mobile Command Vehicle as of 2006. The 37-foot-long (11 m) vehicle has an International chassis and engine and weighs 25,500 pounds (11,600 kg). It is equipped with GPS, satellite television, a diesel electric generator, and a lavatory.

The vehicle is also equipped with a variety of radio systems that allow those operating it to communicate effectively in the field. The vehicle was utilized during Hurricane Katrina relief in September 2005 and is also frequently used at large events throughout the state.

== Miscellaneous information ==
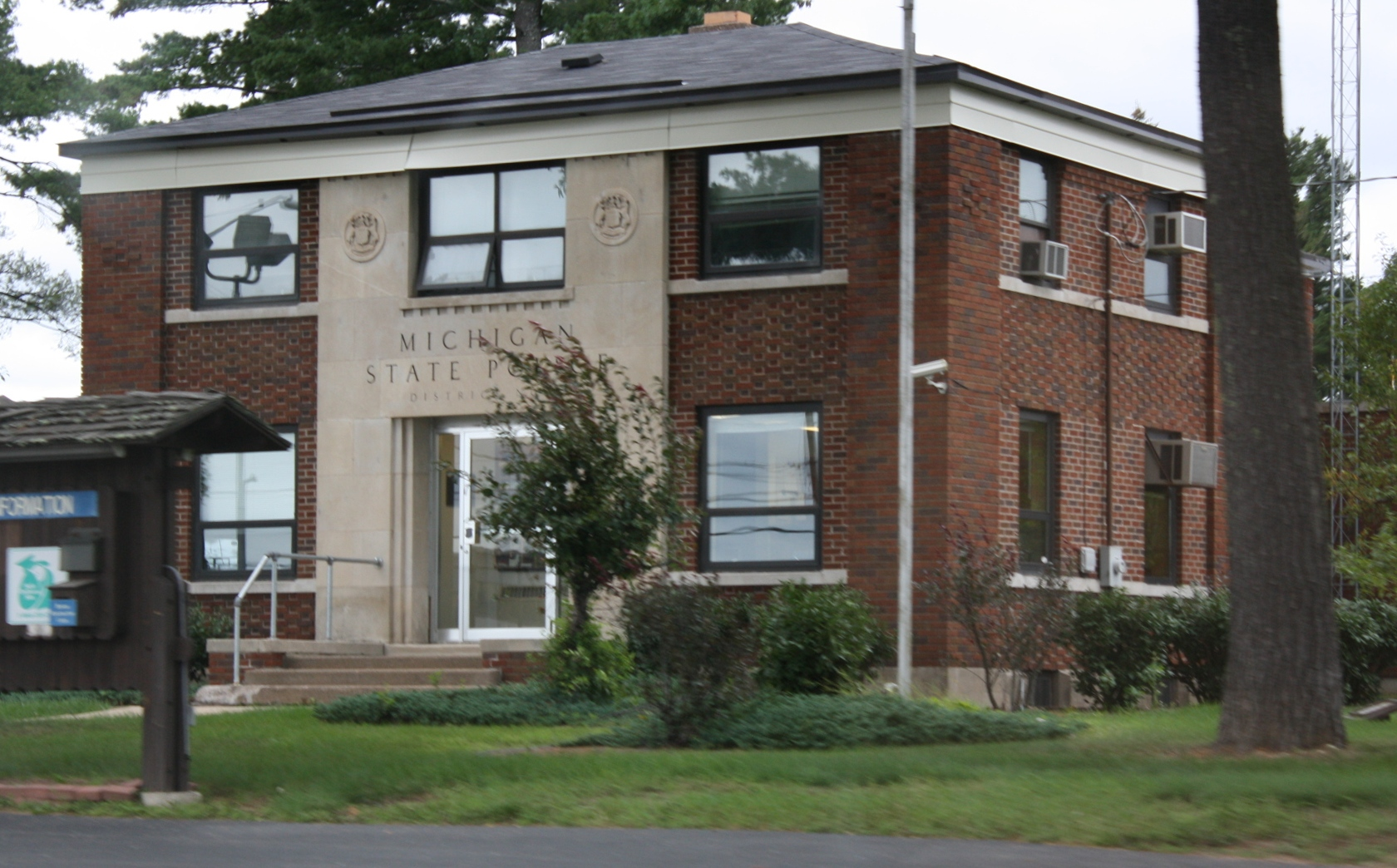
MSP post in Iron Mountain showing the typical architecture

The department's value statement is: "A PROUD tradition of SERVICE through EXCELLENCE, INTEGRITY, and COURTESY". The department requires that the emphasized words be shown in capitalized print when the statement is reproduced in any fashion.

The department's work sites are called "Posts", much as a local police department's offices are referred to as "stations". Many MSP posts are similarly designed and feature a distinctive two-story architectural style with a front door centered above exterior steps to the first level and a sandstone center section engraved with the state seal and the words "Michigan State Police". Many of these buildings were built in the 1930s in the years following The Great Depression just before World War II.

To date, 56 Michigan State Police Troopers have died in the line of duty. The most recent according to the Officer Down Memorial Page is Trooper/Motor Carrier Officer Daniel Kerstetter who, on September 13, 2024, was performing a routine traffic stop and inspection of a semi-truck driving in the left lane of northbound Interstate 75 in the Lincoln Park area of the Detroit metro, as Michigan state law recommends heavy commercial vehicles travel in the right two lanes of highways and the left lane is off-limits, when a female driver who had collapsed at the wheel of her white SUV due to a seizure swerved across the highway, bounced off the concrete barrier on the right shoulder, and then sped down the right shoulder of the expressway before smashing head-long into the back of Kerstetter's patrol SUV, crushing it between her vehicle and the semi he was inspecting. The Lincoln Park and Southgate Police Departments, Kerstetter's supervisor, MSP troopers, and other officers and deputies from other agencies, along with Good Samaritans who saw the crash and pulled over to assist, waited for the arrival of the Southgate and Lincoln Park Fire Departments and private EMS services to help Kerstetter and the seizure victim. Kerstetter's body was removed from the mangled remains of his vehicle with the Jaws of Life and transported by ambulance with police escort, including members of the Detroit Police Department that secured intersections all the along the way ahead of the escort, to Detroit Receiving Hospital, where he was put on life support for two days before his family requested his organs be donated and he was taken off of it. He had only been on the force for almost two years before his untimely death. The seizure victim also died in the collision.

As of January 2024, the Director of the MSP is Colonel James Grady II. He was appointed to the position of Director by Governor Gretchen Whitmer and was preceded by Col. Joe Gasper.

Recruits must complete an intensive twenty-six week training academy prior to being confirmed as a Trooper. The paramilitaristic, residential school is held at the MSP Training Academy in Lansing, MI.

Troopers are issued a 9mm Glock 17 Gen 5 pistol as their sidearm. Troopers are also issued a 9mm Glock 26 Gen 5 pistol as their backup. The issued taser is the Axon Taser 10

FN-15 rifles are carried by the Troopers as well as Beretta semi-automatic 12 gauge shotguns.

=== Budget ===
The State Police Budget for 2009–2010 fiscal year is US$527.3 million, an increase of 5.5 million from the previous year. For the 2018–19 fiscal year, the MSP had a budget of $738.1 million. For the 2020–21 fiscal year, the governor recommended a budget of $735.6 million.

== Department rank structure ==
The MSP uses a paramilitary ranking system, as follows (from highest to lowest rankings):

Title	Insignia
Colonel	
Lieutenant Colonel	
Major	
Captain	
Inspector	
First Lieutenant	
Lieutenant	
Sergeant	
Trooper	No Insignia
Recruit	No Insignia

== Demographics ==
The demographics of the Michigan State Police force, as of March 2015:

- Male: 68%
- Female: 31%
- White: 73.9%
- African-American/Black: 10.4%
- Hispanic: 7.0%
- Native American: 2%
- Asian: 5.2%
- Unknown: 3.5%

== See also ==
- List of law enforcement agencies in Michigan
- Michigan Department of State Police v. Sitz
- Will v. Michigan Department of State Police

General:

- Highway patrol – Police unit
- State patrol – Police unit
- State police – Type of sub-national territorial police force
