= Checkpoint Strikeforce =

Checkpoint Strikeforce is a multi-jurisdictional program in Virginia, Washington, D.C., Delaware, West Virginia, and Maryland to combat drunk driving. Its motto is "Drunk driving, over the limit, under arrest." Checkpoint Strikeforce began in Virginia in 2002. In 2007, 800,000 drivers were stopped at Checkpoint Strikeforce sobriety checkpoints.

== Campaigns ==
In 2013, jurisdictions took part in the "Thanksgiving Belts & Booze Campaign" to draw attention to the high rate of DUI crashes that occur over the holidays. The campaign lasted from November 25 to December 13, 2013.
