= Michigan Department of State Police v. Sitz =

Michigan Dept. of State Police v. Sitz
- Supreme Court of the United States

Argued February 27, 1990 Decided June 14, 1990
- Full case name: Michigan Department Of State Police et al. v. Sitz et al. Certiorari to the Court of Appeals of Michigan
- Citations: 496 U.S. 444 (more) 110 S. Ct. 2481; 110 L. Ed. 2d 412; 1990 U.S. LEXIS 3144

Case history
- Prior: Sitz v. Dep't of State Police, 170 Mich. App. 433, 429 N.W.2d 180 (1988); cert. granted, 493 U.S. 806 (1989).
- Subsequent: On remand, Sitz v. Dep't of State Police, 193 Mich. App. 690, 485 N.W.2d 135 (1992), affirmed, 443 Mich. 744, 506 N.W.2d 209 (1993).

Holding
- Michigan State Police highway sobriety checkpoint program is consistent with the Fourth Amendment.

Court membership
- Chief Justice William Rehnquist Associate Justices William J. Brennan Jr. · Byron White; Thurgood Marshall · Harry Blackmun; John P. Stevens · Sandra Day O'Connor; Antonin Scalia · Anthony Kennedy

Case opinions
- Majority: Rehnquist, joined by White, O'Connor, Scalia, Kennedy
- Concurrence: Blackmun
- Dissent: Brennan, joined by Marshall
- Dissent: Stevens, joined by Brennan, Marshall (Parts I, II)

Laws applied
- U.S. Const. amend. IV

Michigan Dept. of State Police v. Sitz, 496 U.S. 444 (1990), was a United States Supreme Court case involving the constitutionality of police sobriety checkpoints. The Court held 6-3 that these checkpoints met the Fourth Amendment standard of "reasonable search and seizure." However, upon remand to the Michigan Supreme Court, that court held that the checkpoints nonetheless violated the Michigan constitution and remain prohibited.

== Background ==
In the state of Michigan, the state police adopted the practice of using random sobriety checkpoints to catch drunk drivers. A group of Michigan residents sued on the grounds that their Fourth Amendment rights prohibiting unreasonable search and seizure were being violated.

As the dissenting opinion by Justice Stevens explains, "a sobriety checkpoint is usually operated at night at an unannounced location. Surprise is crucial to its method. The test operation conducted by the Michigan State Police and the Saginaw County Sheriff's Department began shortly after midnight and lasted until about 1 a.m. During that period, the 19 officers participating in the operation made two arrests and stopped and questioned 124 other unsuspecting and innocent drivers."

During the operation, drivers would be stopped and briefly questioned while in their vehicles. If an officer suspected that a driver was intoxicated, the driver would be subject to a field sobriety test.

== Holding ==
The Supreme Court held that Michigan had a "substantial government interest" in stopping drunk driving, and that this technique was rationally related to achieving that goal (although there was some evidence to the contrary). The Court also held that the impact on drivers, such as in delaying them from reaching their destination, was negligible, and that the brief questioning to gain "reasonable suspicion" similarly had a negligible impact on the drivers' Fourth Amendment protection against unreasonable search (implying that any more detailed or invasive searches would be treated differently). Applying a balancing test, the Court found that the constitutionality of the search tilted in favor of the government.

== Subsequent Ruling by Michigan Supreme Court on Remand ==
After Sitz was remanded to the Michigan Supreme Court, the Court analyzed the question of whether checkpoints are permitted under the Michigan constitution. The Court concluded that "Because there is no support in the constitutional history of Michigan for the proposition that the police may engage in warrantless and suspicionless seizures of automobiles for the purpose of enforcing the criminal law", checkpoints remain prohibited under Michigan law.

== See also ==
- Illinois v. Lidster (2004)
- United States v. Martinez-Fuerte (1976)
