= United States v. Martinez-Fuerte =

- Supreme Court of the United States

Argued April 26, 1976 Decided July 6, 1976
- Full case name: United States v. Martinez-Fuerte, et al.
- Citations: 428 U.S. 543 (more) 96 S. Ct. 3074; 49 L. Ed. 2d 1116

Case history
- Prior: 514 F.2d 308 (9th Cir. 1975); cert. granted, 423 U.S. 822 (1975).

Holding
- The Border Patrol's routine stopping of a vehicle at a permanent checkpoint located on a major highway away from the Mexican border for brief questioning of the vehicle's occupants is consistent with the Fourth Amendment, and the stops and questioning may be made at reasonably located checkpoints in the absence of any individualized suspicion that the particular vehicle contains illegal aliens.

Court membership
- Chief Justice Warren E. Burger Associate Justices William J. Brennan Jr. · Potter Stewart; Byron White · Thurgood Marshall; Harry Blackmun · Lewis F. Powell Jr. William Rehnquist · John P. Stevens

Case opinions
- Majority: Powell, joined by Burger, Stewart, White, Blackmun, Rehnquist, Stevens
- Dissent: Brennan, joined by Marshall

Laws applied
- U.S. Const. amend. IV

United States v. Martinez-Fuerte, 428 U.S. 543 (1976), was a decision of the United States Supreme Court that allowed the United States Border Patrol to set up permanent or fixed checkpoints on public highways leading to or away from the Mexican border and that the checkpoints are not a violation of the Fourth Amendment.

== History ==
The defendant, Amado Martinez-Fuerte, had agreed to illegally transport two Mexican aliens who had entered the United States through the Port of San Ysidro in San Diego, California. They traveled north and were stopped at a permanent checkpoint on Interstate 5 between Oceanside and San Clemente and then questioned. The two passengers admitted their status, and the defendant was charged with two counts of illegally transporting aliens. He moved to have the evidence suppressed, on the grounds that the checkpoint stop had violated the Fourth Amendment. The motion was denied, and he was convicted of both counts.

== Decision ==
The court ruled 7-2 that the internal checkpoints were not a violation of the Fourth Amendment. The court went on to say that it would be impracticable for the officers to seek warrants for every vehicle searched and that to do so would eliminate any deterrent towards smuggling and illegal immigration. The court felt that any intrusion to motorists was a minimal one and that the government and public interest outweighed the constitutional rights of the individual.

The court also ruled that the stops were Constitutional even if largely based on apparent Mexican ancestry:

"As we have noted earlier, one's expectation of privacy in an automobile and of freedom in its operation are significantly different from the traditional expectation of privacy and freedom in one's residence. United States v. Ortiz, 422 U.S. at 422 U. S. 896 n. 2; see Cardwell v. Lewis, 417 U. S. 583, 417 U. S. 590-591 (1974) (plurality opinion)."

"And the reasonableness of the procedures followed in making these checkpoint stops makes the resulting intrusion on the interests of motorists minimal. On the other hand, the purpose of the stops is legitimate and in the public interest, and the need for this enforcement technique is demonstrated by the records in the cases before us. Accordingly, we hold that the stops and questioning at issue may be made in the absence of any individualized suspicion at reasonably located checkpoints. [Footnote 15]"

Thus, a Border Patrol agent that sends a vehicle to secondary does not violate the Fourth Amendment even without probable cause or even reasonable suspicion:

"We further believe that it is constitutional to refer motorists selectively to the secondary inspection area at the San Clemente checkpoint on the basis of criteria that would not sustain a roving patrol stop." (The court was referring to the Terry v. Ohio requirement of roving patrol).

"Thus, even if it be assumed that such referrals are made largely on the basis of apparent Mexican ancestry, [Footnote 16] we perceive no constitutional violation. Cf. United States v. Brignoni-Ponce, 422 U.S. at 422 U. S. 885-887. As the intrusion here is sufficiently minimal that no particularized reason need exist to justify it, we think it follows that the Border Patrol officers must have wide discretion in selecting the motorists to be diverted for the brief questioning involved."

== Dissenting opinion ==
Justice William J. Brennan, Jr., wrote in his dissent that the decision was a radical new intrusion on citizens' rights and "empties the reasonableness requirement of the Amendment":

"The scheme of the Fourth Amendment becomes meaningful only when it is assured that at some point the conduct of those charged with enforcing the laws can be subjected to the more detached, neutral scrutiny of a judge who must evaluate the reasonableness of a particular search or seizure in light of the particular circumstances. And in making that assessment it is imperative that the facts be judged against an objective standard.... Anything less would invite intrusions upon constitutionally guaranteed rights based on nothing more substantial than inarticulate hunches, a result this Court has consistently refused to sanction."

Part of Justice Brennan's complaint was that it was the ninth decision to rule against Fourth Amendment protections in that term.

== See also ==
- Michigan Dept. of State Police v. Sitz (1990)
- Illinois v. Lidster (2004)
- Osete, Jesus A., The Praetorians: An Analysis of U.S. Border Patrol Checkpoints Following "Martinez-Fuerte". 93 Wash. U. L. Rev. 803 (2016).
