= Illinois v. Lidster =

- Supreme Court of the United States

Argued November 5, 2003 Decided January 13, 2004
- Full case name: People of the State of Illinois v. Robert Lidster
- Citations: 540 U.S. 419 (more) 124 S. Ct. 885; 157 L. Ed. 2d 843

Case history
- Prior: Evidence supporting conviction suppressed by the Illinois Supreme Court, 779 N.E.2d 855 (Ill. 2002)

Holding
- The Fourth Amendment does not forbid the use of a checkpoint to investigate a traffic incident.

Court membership
- Chief Justice William Rehnquist Associate Justices John P. Stevens · Sandra Day O'Connor; Antonin Scalia · Anthony Kennedy; David Souter · Clarence Thomas; Ruth Bader Ginsburg · Stephen Breyer

Case opinions
- Majority: Breyer, joined by Rehnquist, O'Connor, Scalia, Kennedy, Thomas
- Concur/dissent: Stevens, joined by Souter, Ginsburg

Laws applied
- U.S. Const. amend. IV

Illinois v. Lidster, 540 U.S. 419 (2004), was a case in which the Supreme Court of the United States ruled that the Fourth Amendment permits the police to use a roadblock to investigate a traffic incident.

== Facts ==
Just after midnight, on August 23, 1997, a 70-year-old man riding a bicycle on a highway in Lombard, Illinois was killed when a passing car struck him. A week later, at the same time of day and at the same location, the police erected a roadblock. They stopped each passing motorist and handed them a flyer asking for information about the hit-and-run incident.

Robert Lidster approached the checkpoint in his minivan. Before he reached the designated stopping point, Lidster swerved and nearly struck one of the officers. The officer smelled alcohol on Lidster's breath and directed Lidster to a side street where another officer administered field sobriety tests. Lidster was later tried and convicted of driving under the influence of alcohol.

Lidster challenged the lawfulness of his arrest, arguing that the checkpoint violated the Fourth Amendment. The trial court rejected the challenge, but the Illinois Appellate Court accepted it, as did the Illinois Supreme Court. Because a decision of the Virginia Supreme Court had reached the opposite conclusion, the US Supreme Court agreed to hear Lidster's case.

== Majority opinion ==
In City of Indianapolis v. Edmond, 531 U.S. 32 (2000), the US Supreme Court ruled that police checkpoints set up for the purpose of "general crime control" were unreasonable under the Fourth Amendment. Although the Illinois Supreme Court ruled that Edmond required the trial court to suppress the evidence of Lidster's stop, the Court disagreed.

Unlike the checkpoint in Edmond, the "primary law enforcement purpose" of the stop in this case was to "ask vehicle occupants, as members of the public, for their help in providing information about a crime in all likelihood committed by others." Edmond was directed solely at roadblocks whose purpose was general crime control; however, not every activity undertaken by law enforcement falls under the rubric of general crime control. Ordinarily, a brief investigatory stop requires individualized suspicion. In the case of seeking information from the public, the Court reasoned, "the concept of individualized suspicion has little role to play. Like certain other forms of police activity, say, crowd control or public safety, an information-seeking stop is not the kind of event that involves suspicion, or lack of suspicion, of the relevant individual."

The law allows the police to seek the voluntary cooperation of members of the public in investigating crime. The importance of doing so is "offset to some degree by the need to stop a motorist to obtain that help—a need less likely present where a pedestrian, not a motorist, is involved." Although such a stop is a "seizure" in Fourth Amendment terms, it is a reasonable one. The stop is hardly more onerous than ordinary traffic congestion, and the resulting cooperation with the investigation would prove just as fruitful as stopping pedestrians on the street. Accordingly, it would be "anomalous" to allow the police to stop pedestrians and ask for their help in solving crimes but forbid them to stop motorists for the same reason.

The Court stressed that this does not mean that the roadblock in this case was presumptively constitutional. Each roadblock must be evaluated on its own merits. In this case, the "relevant public concern was grave" in that the police were "investigating a crime that resulted in a human death." The roadblock advanced the police's "grave public concern," but it "interfered only minimally with liberty of the sort the Fourth Amendment seeks to protect." The stops were relatively short in duration. They "provided little reason for anxiety or alarm" on the part of the motorists, and there was no indication that the police acted in a discriminatory manner. Thus, the checkpoint stop was constitutional.

== Concurring opinion ==
Justice Stevens pointed out that pedestrians are free to keep walking when they see a police officer handing out flyers or seeking information while "motorists who confront a roadblock are required to stop, and to remain stopped for as long as the officers choose to detain them." At the same time, the "likelihood that questioning a random sample of drivers will yield useful information about a hit-and-run incident that occurred a week earlier is speculative at best." However, neither of the lower courts had balanced the relative factors weighing in favor of and against finding the seizure reasonable, as the per se rule of Edmond dictated the outcome of this case. Consequently, Stevens opined he would remand the case to the Illinois courts to perform the balancing in the first instance.

== See also ==
- List of United States Supreme Court cases, volume 540
- List of United States Supreme Court cases
