= Foundation Insurance Test =

The Foundation Insurance Test (FIT) is an insurance qualification in the United Kingdom. The Foundation Insurance Test is considered an entry-level qualification for those beginning insurance careers and is usually taken before advancing to more demanding examinations such as the CII exams. The exam is multiple choice and in 2012 the exam had a pass rate of 78.43%. A nominal pass mark is set at 70% although the actual pass mark may vary.

The test covers several areas of insurance:

- Understanding how the insurance market operates
- Understanding risk and insurance in the context of the insurance market
- Understanding agency and insurance legal principles
- Understanding insurance and underwriting procedures
- Understanding policy wordings and procedures for renewals
- Understanding insurance procedures for claims
- Understanding the conduct of insurance business
- Understanding personal insurance
- Understanding commercial insurance

== See also ==
- Certificate of Insurance
