= Mothers Against Drunk Driving =

American nonprofit organization

- Abbreviation: MADD
- Formation: September 5, 1980; 46 years ago
- Founder: Candace Lightner
- Tax ID no.: 94-2707273
- Legal status: 501(c)(3) nonprofit organization
- Headquarters: Irving, Texas, United States
- Chair of the Board of Directors: Sophia Toh
- President: Tess Rowland
- Chief Executive Officer: Stacey D. Stewart
- Affiliations: MADD Canada; Mothers Against Drunk Driving Foundation; MADD Brazil
- Revenue: $36,647,349 (2023)
- Expenses: $39,083,990 (2023)
- Endowment: $10,000
- Employees: 426 (2013)
- Volunteers: 8,582 (2013)
- Website: www.madd.org

Mothers Against Drunk Driving (MADD) is an American non-profit organization which advocates against drunk driving.

The Irving, Texas-based organization was founded on September 5, 1980, in California by Candace Lightner after her 13-year-old daughter, Cari, was killed by a drunk driver.

There is at least one MADD office in every state of the United States, at least one in each province of Canada, and in Brazil.

== Positions ==
According to MADD's website, "MADD’s mission is to end drunk and drugged driving, support the victims of these violent crimes, and prevent underage drinking and other drug use." Generally MADD favors strict policy in a variety of areas, including an illegal blood alcohol content of .08% or lower and using stronger sanctions for DUI offenders, including mandatory jail sentences, treatment for alcoholism and other alcohol abuse issues, ignition interlock devices, and license suspensions; maintaining the minimum legal drinking age at 21 years; and mandating alcohol breath-testing ignition interlock devices for everyone convicted of driving while legally impaired.

MADD's founder Candace Lightner left the group in 1985. In the same year, Stevie Wonder added the song "Don't Drive Drunk" on the Woman in Red movie soundtrack that referenced MADD and summarized its policy positions.

In 2002, as reported by The Washington Times, Lightner stated that MADD "has become far more neo-prohibitionist than I had ever wanted or envisioned … I didn't start MADD to deal with alcohol. I started MADD to deal with the issue of drunk driving".

Author Susan Cheever and the SAGE Encyclopedia of Social Problems have said MADD is a manifestation of the temperance movement.

== History ==
On May 3, 1980, Carime Lightner, a 13-year-old girl, was killed in a hit-and-run by a drunk driver at Sunset and New York Avenues in Fair Oaks, California. The 46-year-old driver, who had recently been arrested for another DUI hit-and-run, left Cari's body at the scene. Cari's mother, Candace (Candy) Lightner, organized Mothers Against Drunk Driving and subsequently served as its founding president. A 1983 television movie about Lightner garnered publicity for the group, which grew rapidly.

MADD Logo used from 2002 to 2009

In the early 1980s, the group attracted the attention of the United States Congress. Senator Frank Lautenberg (D-NJ) did not like the fact that youth in New Jersey could easily travel to New York to purchase alcoholic beverages, circumventing New Jersey's law restricting consumption to those 21 years old and older.

M.A.D.D.: Mothers Against Drunk Drivers, a film about the formation of the organization, was released in 1983.

In 1990, MADD Canada was founded with Toronto activist John Bates as chair.

MADD's national president was Millie I. Webb in 2002. Chuck Hurley became MADD CEO in 2005. He retired in June 2010 and was replaced by Kimberly Earle, who had been CEO of Susan G. Komen for the Cure since 2007. Earle left to become the president of a new foundation of Sanford Health in January 2012, the Edith Sanford Breast Cancer Foundation. Debbie Weir replaced her as MADD's CEO.

== Funding ==
According to the Obama-Coburn Federal Funding Accountability Transparency Act of 2006, MADD received $56,814 in funds from the federal government in fiscal year 2000, and a total of $9,593,455 between fiscal years 2001 and 2006.

In 2005, USA Today reported that the American Institute of Philanthropy was reducing MADD from a "C" to a "D" in its ratings. The Institute noted that MADD categorizes much of its fundraising expenses as "educational expenses", and that up to 58% of its revenue was expended on what the Institute considered fundraising and management.

Charity Navigator rated MADD at 63.53 out of 100 on its financial rating scale and 96.00 out of 100 on its accountability and transparency scale for its 2013 fiscal year. MADD reported that it spent 24.4% of its total expenses on fundraising that year.

== Activities and criticisms ==
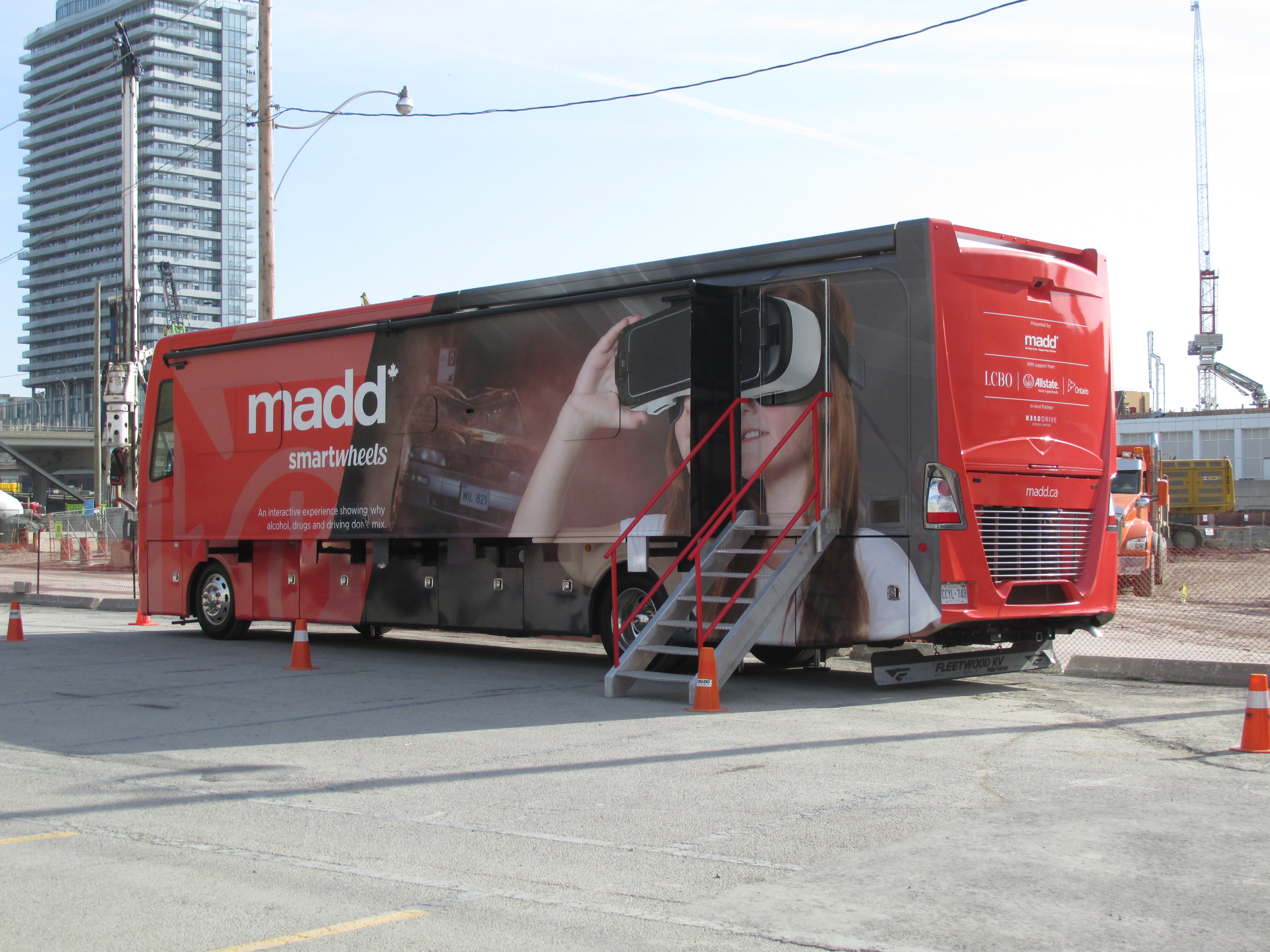
MADD SmartWheels bus in Toronto, Canada

Radley Balko, an advocate for decriminalizing drunk driving, argued in a December 2002 article that MADD's policies were becoming overbearing. "In fairness, MADD deserves credit for raising awareness of the dangers of driving while intoxicated. It was almost certainly MADD's dogged efforts to spark public debate that effected the drop in fatalities since 1980, when Candy Lightner founded the group after her daughter was killed by a drunk driver," Balko wrote. "But MADD is at heart a bureaucracy, a big one. It boasts an annual budget of $45 million, $12 million of which pays for salaries, pensions and benefits. Bureaucracies don't change easily, even when the problems they were created to address change." CharityWatch gives MADD a "C−" grade.

=== Drunk driving laws ===
MADD was heavily involved in lobbying to reduce the legal limit for blood alcohol from BAC .10 to BAC .08. In 2000, this standard was passed by Congress, and by 2004, every state had a legal .08 BAC limit. MADD Canada has called for a maximum legal BAC of .05. Although many MADD leaders have supported a lower limit, MADD has not called for a legal limit of .05 in the United States.

=== Blood alcohol content ===
Prior to MADD's influence, drunk driving laws addressed the danger by making it a criminal offense to drive a vehicle while impaired — that is, while "under the influence of alcohol"; the amount of alcohol in the body was evidence of that impairment. The level specified at that time — commonly, 0.15% — was high enough to indicate drunkenness rather than impairment. In part due to MADD's influence, all 50 states have now passed laws making it a criminal offense to drive with a designated level of alcohol of .08% or higher, except that Utah sets it at .05%.

=== Sobriety checkpoints ===
Radley Balko, opponent of limits on drunk driving and writer for Reason Magazine, discusses the possible social implications of some of MADD's policies in a 2002 article. He writes, "In its eight-point plan to 'jump-start the stalled war on drunk driving,' MADD advocates the use of highly publicized but random roadblocks to find drivers who have been drinking."

=== Beer taxes ===
Balko criticizes MADD for not advocating higher excise taxes on distilled spirits, even though it campaigns for higher excise taxes for beer. He writes, "Interestingly, MADD refrains from calling for an added tax on distilled spirits, an industry that the organization has partnered with on various drunk driving awareness projects." MADD writes, "Currently, the federal excise tax is $.05 per can of beer, $.04 for a glass of wine and $.12 for a shot of distilled spirits, which all contain about the same amount of alcohol." Point 7 of MADD's 8-Point Plan is to "Increase beer excise taxes to equal the current excise tax on distilled spirits".

=== Breath alcohol ignition interlock devices ===
MADD has proposed that breath alcohol ignition interlock devices should be installed in all new cars. Tom Incantalupo of Newsday wrote, "Ultimately, the group said yesterday, it wants so-called alcohol interlock devices factory-installed in all new cars. "The main reason why people continue to drive drunk today is because they can," MADD president Glynn Birch said at a news teleconference from Washington, D.C."

A review by the California Department of Motor Vehicles concluded that "interlock works for some offenders in some contexts, but not for all offenders in all situations. More specifically, ignition interlock devices work best when they are installed, although there is also some evidence that judicial orders to install an interlock are effective for repeat DUI offenders, even when not all offenders comply and install a device. California's administrative program, where repeat DUI offenders install an interlock device in order to obtain restricted driving privileges, is also associated with reductions in subsequent DUI incidents. One group for whom ignition interlock orders do not appear effective is first DUI offenders with high blood alcohol levels."

== See also ==
- Alcohol-related traffic crashes in the United States
- Amethyst Initiative
- Choose Responsibility
- Driving under the influence
- Drunk driving in the United States
- Foundation for Advancing Alcohol Responsibility
- Reduce Impaired Driving Everywhere
- Woman's Christian Temperance Union
