= 2019 Indiana 250 =

Race details
- Race 25 of 33 in the 2019 NASCAR Xfinity Series season
- Date: September 7, 2019
- Location: Indianapolis Motor Speedway in Speedway, Indiana
- Course: Permanent racing facility
- Course length: 2.5 miles (4 km)
- Distance: 100 laps, 250 mi (400 km)

Pole position
Driver	Kyle Busch	Joe Gibbs Racing
- Time: 53.445

Most laps led
Driver	Kyle Busch	Joe Gibbs Racing
- Laps: 46

Winner
No. 18	Kyle Busch	Joe Gibbs Racing

Television in the United States
- Network: NBCSN

Radio in the United States
- Radio: MRN

The 2019 Indiana 250 was a NASCAR Xfinity Series race held on September 7, 2019, at Indianapolis Motor Speedway in Speedway, Indiana. Contested over 100 laps on the 2.5-mile (4.0 km) speedway, it was the 25th race of the 2019 NASCAR Xfinity Series season.

== Background ==
=== Track ===
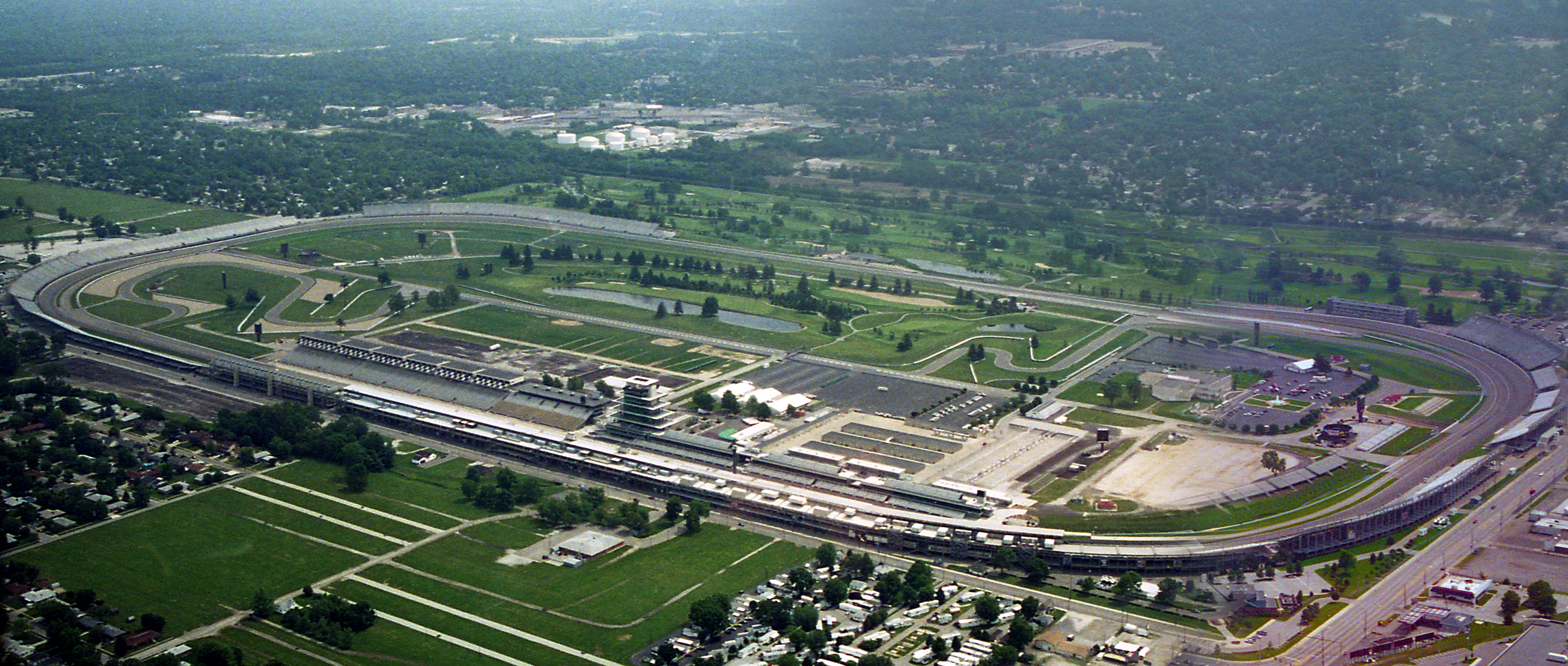
Indianapolis Motor Speedway, the track where the race was held.

The Indianapolis Motor Speedway, located in Speedway, Indiana, (an enclave suburb of Indianapolis) in the United States, is the home of the Indianapolis 500 and the Brickyard 400. It is located on the corner of 16th Street and Georgetown Road, approximately six miles (10 km) west of Downtown Indianapolis.

Constructed in 1909, it is the original speedway, the first racing facility so named. It has a permanent seating capacity estimated at 235,000 with infield seating raising capacity to an approximate 400,000. It is the highest-capacity sports venue in the world.

Considered relatively flat by American standards, the track is a 2.5-mile (4.0 km), nearly rectangular oval with dimensions that have remained essentially unchanged since its inception: four 0.25-mile (0.40 km) turns, two 0.625-mile-long (1.006 km) straightaways between the fourth and first turns and the second and third turns, and two .125-mile (0.201 km) short straightaways – termed "short chutes" – between the first and second, and third and fourth turns.

== Entry list ==
No.	Driver	Team	Manufacturer	Sponsor
00	Cole Custer	Stewart-Haas Racing with Biagi-DenBeste Racing	Ford	Haas Automation
0	Garrett Smithley	JD Motorsports	Chevrolet	JD Motorsports, Contec
01	Stephen Leicht	JD Motorsports	Chevrolet	JD Motorsports
1	Michael Annett	JR Motorsports	Chevrolet	Pilot, Flying J
2	Tyler Reddick	Richard Childress Racing	Chevrolet	Anderson's Maple Syrup, Schnucks
4	Landon Cassill	JD Motorsports	Chevrolet	Flex Seal
5	Matt Mills	B. J. McLeod Motorsports	Chevrolet	J.F. Electric
07	Ray Black Jr.	SS-Green Light Racing	Chevrolet	Isokern Fireplaces & Chimmeys
7	Justin Allgaier	JR Motorsports	Chevrolet	Suave Men
08	Gray Gaulding (R)	SS-Green Light Racing	Chevrolet	Panini America
8	Jeb Burton	JR Motorsports	Chevrolet	State Water Heaters
9	Noah Gragson (R)	JR Motorsports	Chevrolet	Switch
10	Austin Dillon (i)	Kaulig Racing	Chevrolet	Ellsworth Advisors
11	Justin Haley (R)	Kaulig Racing	Chevrolet	Leaf Filter
13	Chad Finchum	MBM Motorsports	Toyota	CrashClaimsR.Us
15	B. J. McLeod	JD Motorsports	Chevrolet	JD Motorsports
17	Kyle Weatherman	Rick Ware Racing	Chevrolet	Rick Ware Racing
18	Kyle Busch (i)	Joe Gibbs Racing	Toyota	Combos Stuffed Snacks
19	Brandon Jones	Joe Gibbs Racing	Toyota	First Foundation
20	Christopher Bell	Joe Gibbs Racing	Toyota	Rheem, Parker Hannifin
22	Austin Cindric	Team Penske	Ford	Menards, Richmond Water Heaters
23	John Hunter Nemechek (R)	GMS Racing	Chevrolet	Fire Alarm Services
35	Joey Gase	MBM Motorsports	Toyota	MBM Motorsports
36	Josh Williams	DGM Racing	Chevrolet	Mastin & Cain Warehousing
38	J. J. Yeley	RSS Racing	Chevrolet	RSS Racing
39	Ryan Sieg	RSS Racing	Chevrolet	Alabama Soda & Abrasive Blasting "Strip It Naked!"
51	Jeremy Clements	Jeremy Clements Racing	Chevrolet	BRT Extrusions, RepariableVehicles.com
52	David Starr	Jimmy Means Racing	Chevrolet	Northern Builders, Striping Technology L.P.
61	Austin Hill (i)	MBM Motorsports	Toyota	Aisin Group
66	Tommy Joe Martins	MBM Motorsports	Toyota	Diamond Gusset Jeans
74	Mike Harmon	Mike Harmon Racing	Chevrolet	Mike Harmon Racing
78	Vinnie Miller	B. J. McLeod Motorsports	Chevrolet	Pit Viper Sunglasses
86	Brandon Brown	Brandonbilt Motorsports	Chevrolet	Vero True Social
89	Morgan Shepherd	Shepherd Racing Ventures	Chevrolet	Racing With Jesus, Visone RV
90	Ronnie Bassett Jr.	DGM Racing	Chevrolet	Bassett Gutters & More, Inc.
93	Josh Bilicki	RSS Racing	Chevrolet	Insurance King
98	Chase Briscoe (R)	Stewart-Haas Racing with Biagi-DenBeste Racing	Ford	Ford Performance
99	Stefan Parsons	B. J. McLeod Motorsports	Toyota	Phoenix Construction

== Practice ==
=== First practice ===
Christopher Bell was the fastest in the first practice session with a time of 53.502 seconds and a speed of 168.218 mph (270.721 km/h).

Pos	No.	Driver	Team	Manufacturer	Time	Speed
1	20	Christopher Bell	Joe Gibbs Racing	Toyota	53.502	168.218
2	19	Brandon Jones	Joe Gibbs Racing	Toyota	53.503	168.215
3	18	Kyle Busch (i)	Joe Gibbs Racing	Toyota	53.641	167.782

=== Final practice ===
Justin Haley was the fastest in the final practice session with a time of 53.499 seconds and a speed of 168.227 mph (270.735 km/h).

Pos	No.	Driver	Team	Manufacturer	Time	Speed
1	11	Justin Haley (R)	Kaulig Racing	Chevrolet	53.499	168.227
2	2	Tyler Reddick	Richard Childress Racing	Chevrolet	53.508	168.199
3	19	Brandon Jones	Joe Gibbs Racing	Toyota	53.509	168.196

== Qualifying ==
Kyle Busch scored the pole for the race with a time of 53.445 seconds and a speed of 168.397 mph (271.009 km/h).

=== Qualifying results ===
Pos	No	Driver	Team	Manufacturer	Time
1	18	Kyle Busch (i)	Joe Gibbs Racing	Toyota	53.445
2	19	Brandon Jones	Joe Gibbs Racing	Toyota	53.545
3	20	Christopher Bell	Joe Gibbs Racing	Toyota	53.790
4	2	Tyler Reddick	Richard Childress Racing	Chevrolet	54.149
5	23	John Hunter Nemechek (R)	GMS Racing	Chevrolet	54.156
6	22	Austin Cindric	Team Penske	Ford	54.223
7	11	Justin Haley (R)	Kaulig Racing	Chevrolet	54.334
8	7	Justin Allgaier	JR Motorsports	Chevrolet	54.419
9	98	Chase Briscoe (R)	Stewart-Haas Racing with Biagi-DenBeste Racing	Ford	54.515
10	39	Ryan Sieg	RSS Racing	Chevrolet	54.520
11	00	Cole Custer	Stewart-Haas Racing with Biagi-DenBeste Racing	Ford	54.625
12	8	Jeb Burton	JR Motorsports	Chevrolet	54.665
13	9	Noah Gragson (R)	JR Motorsports	Chevrolet	54.667
14	10	Austin Dillon (i)	Kaulig Racing	Chevrolet	54.703
15	1	Michael Annett	JR Motorsports	Chevrolet	54.711
16	08	Gray Gaulding (R)	SS-Green Light Racing	Chevrolet	55.035
17	61	Austin Hill (i)	MBM Motorsports	Toyota	55.133
18	51	Jeremy Clements	Jeremy Clements Racing	Chevrolet	55.360
19	36	Josh Williams	DGM Racing	Chevrolet	55.491
20	90	Ronnie Bassett Jr.	DGM Racing	Chevrolet	55.517
21	15	B. J. McLeod	JD Motorsports	Chevrolet	55.637
22	99	Stefan Parsons	B. J. McLeod Motorsports	Toyota	55.757
23	93	Josh Bilicki	RSS Racing	Chevrolet	55.765
24	38	J. J. Yeley	RSS Racing	Chevrolet	55.848
25	52	David Starr	Jimmy Means Racing	Chevrolet	55.893
26	07	Ray Black Jr.	SS-Green Light Racing	Chevrolet	55.932
27	5	Matt Mills	B. J. McLeod Motorsports	Chevrolet	55.932
28	66	Tommy Joe Martins	MBM Motorsports	Toyota	56.006
29	35	Joey Gase	MBM Motorsports	Toyota	56.019
30	01	Stephen Leicht	JD Motorsports	Chevrolet	56.072
31	86	Brandon Brown (R)	Brandonbilt Motorsports	Chevrolet	56.094
32	0	Garrett Smithley	JD Motorsports	Chevrolet	56.129
33	89	Morgan Shepherd	Shepherd Racing Ventures	Chevrolet	56.172
34	4	Landon Cassill	JD Motorsports	Chevrolet	56.395
35	78	Vinnie Miller	B. J. McLeod Motorsports	Chevrolet	56.822
36	13	Chad Finchum	MBM Motorsports	Toyota	56.962
37	74	Mike Harmon	Mike Harmon Racing	Chevrolet	57.067
38	17	Kyle Weatherman	Rick Ware Racing	Chevrolet	57.368

== Race ==
=== Summary ===
Kyle Busch started on pole, with Joe Gibbs Racing teammates Brandon Jones and Christopher Bell following closely. Tyler Reddick and the trio separated themselves from the rest of the field. On lap 15, Austin Dillon stalled on the backstretch access road after pitting issues. Busch fell behind after having to pit twice as not all lug nuts were tight on the car. Bell took the lead on the restart, but David Starr blew an engine soon after and brought out the next caution. After the next round of stops, Jones inherited the lead and held off Busch and Austin Cindric to win Stage 1.

After the restart, Brandon Brown spun and brought out the caution again. Busch took the lead and led until lap 50, where Justin Allgaier began approaching quickly and finally passed him three laps later. Allgaier pulled away from Busch and won stage 2. He also traded the lead often with Busch after the restart. Reddick also joined the battle until the next caution, where Josh Williams and Justin Haley strategically took the lead on the restart. Reddick and Bell were able to pass them as they struggled with maintaining the lead.

Busch raced his way back to third, and Cindric and Jones made contact, resulting in Jones spinning with under 15 laps remaining. The final caution and red flag happened when Bell and Reddick started next to each other; Bell got loose and slid into Reddick, causing both to slam hard into the wall. After the cleanup, Busch and Allgaier started in the front. Busch quickly got ahead of Allgaier, but couldn't pull away, while Allgaier also couldn't catch up. Busch ultimately managed to hold off Allgaier and won the race, taking his 96th Xfinity series win.

=== Stage Results ===
Stage One Laps: 30

Pos	No	Driver	Team	Manufacturer	Points
1	19	Brandon Jones	Joe Gibbs Racing	Toyota	10
2	22	Austin Cindric	Team Penske	Ford	9
3	18	Kyle Busch (i)	Joe Gibbs Racing	Toyota	0
4	9	Noah Gragson (R)	JR Motorsports	Chevrolet	7
5	00	Cole Custer	Stewart-Haas Racing with Biagi-DenBeste	Ford	6
6	7	Justin Allgaier	JR Motorsports	Chevrolet	5
7	20	Christopher Bell	Joe Gibbs Racing	Toyota	4
8	11	Justin Haley (R)	Kaulig Racing	Chevrolet	3
9	98	Chase Briscoe (R)	Stewart-Haas Racing with Biagi-DenBeste	Ford	2
10	2	Tyler Reddick	Richard Childress Racing	Chevrolet	1

Stage Two Laps: 30

Pos	No	Driver	Team	Manufacturer	Points
1	7	Justin Allgaier	JR Motorsports	Chevrolet	10
2	18	Kyle Busch (i)	Joe Gibbs Racing	Toyota	0
3	2	Tyler Reddick	Richard Childress Racing	Chevrolet	8
4	8	Jeb Burton	JR Motorsports	Chevrolet	7
5	19	Brandon Jones	Joe Gibbs Racing	Toyota	6
6	20	Christopher Bell	Joe Gibbs Racing	Toyota	5
7	98	Chase Briscoe (R)	Stewart-Haas Racing with Biagi-DenBeste	Ford	4
8	00	Cole Custer	Stewart-Haas Racing with Biagi-DenBeste	Ford	3
9	39	Ryan Sieg	RSS Racing	Chevrolet	2
10	9	Noah Gragson (R)	JR Motorsports	Chevrolet	1

=== Final Stage Results ===
Stage Three Laps: 40

Pos	Grid	No	Driver	Team	Manufacturer	Laps	Points
1	1	18	Kyle Busch (i)	Joe Gibbs Racing	Toyota	100	0
2	8	7	Justin Allgaier	JR Motorsports	Chevrolet	100	50
3	13	9	Noah Gragson (R)	JR Motorsports	Chevrolet	100	42
4	12	8	Jeb Burton	JR Motorsports	Chevrolet	100	40
5	7	11	Justin Haley (R)	Kaulig Racing	Chevrolet	100	35
6	2	19	Brandon Jones	Joe Gibbs Racing	Toyota	100	47
7	11	00	Cole Custer	Stewart-Haas Racing with Biagi-DenBeste	Ford	100	39
8	9	98	Chase Briscoe (R)	Stewart-Haas Racing with Biagi-DenBeste	Ford	100	35
9	17	61	Austin Hill (i)	MBM Motorsports	Toyota	100	0
10	10	39	Ryan Sieg	RSS Racing	Chevrolet	100	29
11	18	51	Jeremy Clements	Jeremy Clements Racing	Chevrolet	100	26
12	15	1	Michael Annett	JR Motorsports	Chevrolet	100	25
13	16	08	Gray Gaulding	SS-Green Light Racing	Chevrolet	100	24
14	32	0	Garrett Smithley	JD Motorsports	Chevrolet	100	23
15	20	90	Ronnie Bassett Jr.	DGM Racing	Chevrolet	100	22
16	34	4	Landon Cassill	JD Motorsports	Chevrolet	100	21
17	19	36	Josh Williams	DGM Racing	Chevrolet	100	20
18	29	35	Joey Gase	MBM Motorsports	Toyota	100	19
19	22	99	Stefan Parsons	B. J. McLeod Motorsports	Toyota	100	18
20	26	07	Ray Black Jr.	SS-Green Light Racing	Chevrolet	100	17
21	23	93	Josh Bilicki	RSS Racing	Chevrolet	100	16
22	21	15	B. J. McLeod	JD Motorsports	Chevrolet	100	15
23	30	01	Stephen Leicht	JD Motorsports	Chevrolet	100	14
24	28	66	Tommy Joe Martins	MBM Motorsports	Toyota	100	13
25	27	5	Matt Mills	B. J. McLeod Motorsports	Chevrolet	100	12
26	35	78	Vinnie Miller	B. J. McLeod Motorsports	Chevrolet	99	11
27	6	22	Austin Cindric	Team Penske	Ford	98	19
28	31	86	Brandon Brown (R)	Brandonbilt Motorsports	Chevrolet	97	9
29	3	20	Christopher Bell	Joe Gibbs Racing	Toyota	92	17
30	4	2	Tyler Reddick	Richard Childress Racing	Chevrolet	92	16
31	5	23	John Hunter Nemechek (R)	GMS Racing	Chevrolet	79	6
32	37	74	Mike Harmon	Mike Harmon Racing	Chevrolet	42	5
33	36	13	Chad Finchum	MBM Motorsports	Toyota	41	4
34	14	10	Austin Dillon (i)	Kaulig Racing	Chevrolet	37	0
35	38	17	Kyle Weatherman	Rick Ware Racing	Chevrolet	35	2
36	33	89	Morgan Shepherd	Shepherd Racing Ventures	Chevrolet	34	1
37	25	52	David Starr	Jimmy Means Racing	Chevrolet	23	1
38	24	38	J. J. Yeley	RSS Racing	Chevrolet	7	1

Previous race: 2019 Sport Clips Haircuts VFW 200	NASCAR Xfinity Series; 2019 season	Next race: 2019 Rhino Pro Truck Outfitters 300
