= New Sobriety =

New Sobriety may refer to:

- The "New Sobriety Movement", or Neo-prohibitionism
- New Objectivity, an artistic movement in Weimar Germany
