= Neo-prohibitionism =

Contemporary movement to stop consumption of alcohol

Neo-prohibitionism (also spelled neoprohibitionism and neo-Prohibitionism) is a current social movement to attempt to stop consumption of alcohol in society through legislation and policies which further restrict the sale, possession, and marketing of alcohol in order to reduce average per capita consumption and change social norms to reduce its acceptability.

== Terminology ==
The term is usually used critically to describe groups or individuals, rather than by the groups or individuals themselves. For example, Candace Lightner, the founder of Mothers Against Drunk Driving (MADD), eventually left the organization in anger and has since gone on to criticize it as neo-prohibitionist, stating that MADD "has become far more neo-prohibitionist than I had ever wanted or envisioned … I didn't start MADD to deal with alcohol. I started MADD to deal with the issue of drunk driving". Lightner was criticizing MADD's leaders who had called for the criminalization of all driving after drinking any amount of alcoholic beverage.

In Europe, the World Health Organization in 1992 launched a so-called Alcohol Action Plan that aimed at a continuous reduction of the per capita consumption; this attempt was criticized as "crypto-prohibitionism".

== Studies ==
The concept of neo-prohibitionism has been used and studied by scholars at George Mason University, Ohio State University, Brown University, Indiana University, the University of Houston, the University of Western Ontario, the University of California, San Diego, Washington University in St. Louis, the School of Public Health at the University of North Carolina at Chapel Hill, Kean University.

== See also ==
- Alcohol laws of the United States by state
- Prohibition
- Prohibition Party
- Sumptuary law
