= Foundation for Advancing Alcohol Responsibility =

American non-profit organization

- Nickname: Responsibility.org
- Founded: 1991
- Type: Non-profit
- Purpose: Eliminating drunk driving and underage drinking
- Headquarters: Washington, DC
- Location(s): 101 Constitution Avenue, NW; Suite 375 East; Washington, DC 20001
- Region served: United States
- Key people: Chris Swonger, President and CEO; Leslie Kimball, Executive Director
- Website: www.responsibility.org

Foundation for Advancing Alcohol Responsibility (Responsibility.org), formerly known as the Century Council, is an American not-for-profit organization founded in 1991 and funded by a group of America's leading distillers that aims to eliminate drunk driving and underage drinking and promotes responsible decision-making regarding alcohol use by adults who choose to drink.

The Washington, D.C. based organization has an independent national advisory board with members in the realm of education, medicine, government, business, and other relevant disciplines who assist in the development of programs, initiatives, and policies. The organization is also supported by educational and judicial advisory boards whose members contribute their professional expertise to help shape programming that aligns with their respective fields.

Funding companies include Bacardi, Brown-Forman, Campari Group, Constellation Brands, DIAGEO, Edrington, Hotaling & Co, Mast-Jägermeister US, Moët Hennessy USA, Ole Smoky, LLC, Pernod Ricard, Suntory Global Spirits, and William Grant & Sons.

Responsibility.org’s website includes a map that offers up-to-date state statistics and laws on the topics of underage drinking and drunk and impaired driving in the United States.

The website also includes tips for drinking and hosting responsibly, conversation starters for parents and resources for policymakers that include policy recommendations, and different checklists, including a DUID checklist and another with practical suggestions on how to implement responsible alcohol laws that fit a community.

== Programs and initiatives ==
Responsibility.org works with law enforcement, public officials, educators, parents and students to create resources and materials aimed at drunk driving prevention and underage drinking prevention, and alcohol education, including promoting responsible decision making around alcohol consumption:

- Alcohol 101+. is an interactive online program which aims to help students make safe and responsible decisions about alcohol on college campuses. The program aims to equip students with knowledge and understanding about the impacts of alcohol, to mitigate risks, and embrace healthy decision making.
- Ask, Listen, Learn: Kids and Alcohol Don't Mix. A free program targeted at kids ages 9-13 and their parents and educators, to give kids the skills and information needed to say “NO” to underage drinking and underage cannabis use. The program provides free materials and resources, including lesson plans, that encourage parents and teachers to engage in ongoing dialogue about the dangers of underage drinking with kids using science-based research about how the developing brain works. It is the most widely-distributed underage drinking prevention program of its kind. In 2025, a new lesson plan focused on mental health was added to the program.
- Attorney General Public Service Announcements. Responsibility.org has worked with state Attorneys General from across the country for over 20 years to spread messages in April for Alcohol Responsibility Month and December for National Impaired Driving Prevention Month.
- Computerized Assessment and Referral System (CARS). CARS was created by Responsibility.org and Harvard University’s Cambridge Health Alliance Division on Addiction. CARS is designed to be used to screen and assess impaired drivers for substance abuse and mental health disorders. The goal is to help inform judges of an offender's treatment needs and hopefully reduce recidivism. The system is made available for use by judicial systems.
- Grants. Responsibility.org, the Governors Highway Safety Association (GHSA), and the National Alliance to Stop Impaired Driving (NASID) provide grants to various entities and organizations to support impaired driving prevention. This includes grants to states for training programs that support the detection and prevention of drug-impaired driving. Since 2014, Responsibility.org has awarded more than $1.1 million to State Highway Offices across the United States.
- I Know Everything. A program to encourage parents to talk to their teenagers and share safe driving tips.
- Influencer Teams. Responsibility.org partners with online influencers to reach parents online and help them talk with their kids about alcohol in order to prevent underage drinking and the lifestyle that can come from it.
- National Alliance to Stop Impaired Driving (NASID). Responsibility.org established and leads the NASID coalition. It is dedicated to eliminating all impaired driving, including multiple substance impaired driving. NASID works with researchers and road safety professionals and advocates on state and federal advocacy efforts, public awareness initiatives, and education measures.
- Responsibility Starts with Me. A campaign that highlights everyday people who share their perspectives on the importance of responsible decision making in their everyday lives.
- Responsibility Works. An eLearning tool for employers to use with their employees that provides information about alcohol to adults so they can be responsible drinkers if and when they choose to drink, model responsible alcohol consumption towards others, and understand how alcohol affects their bodies and behaviors.
- SoberRide. The SoberRide program offers free Lyft rides during certain holiday time periods to adults in the Greater Washington area. The program is offered by Washington Regional Alcohol Program (WRAP), and Responsibility.org is one of the program’s sponsors.
- Virtual Bar. A free, educational website and mobile app that supports responsible drinking by showing how little alcohol may be required to reach legal driving limits. The tool allows adults to plug in detailed factors about themselves such as age, height, weight, gender, sex, and their plans for the night, including what they plan to eat and drink- so they can understand how those factors will affect their body’s blood alcohol content (BAC), and when their BAC will return to 0.0.
- We Don't Serve Teens A public awareness campaign designed to prevent teen drinking by informing adults that providing underage drinkers with alcohol is unsafe, illegal and irresponsible. The campaign debuted in 2006 in partnership with the Federal Trade Commission, but has run multiple times; in 2022, it ran with the slogan, “Nothing Justifies Underage Drinking.” Responsibility.org promoted the campaign through a website (WeDontServeTeens.org), exhibit booths, logos, badges, posters, and social media.
- Wrong Side of the Road. This is a free series of videos designed for 21-to 35-year-olds to educate them about the dangers of impaired driving, with real-life experience and consequences shared through the eyes of past drunk drivers. This demographic is at high risk of DUI crashes and deaths. The global program was developed by the United Nations Institute for Training and Research (UNITAR) and Diageo, and implemented in the United States by Responsibility.org.

== Partners ==
Responsibility.org’s industry collaboration comes from partnering with organizations, law enforcement, parents, educators, and others in support of its mission to eliminate drunk driving, impaired driving, and underage drinking, and to promote responsible alcohol choices. A few of these partners have included:

- American Association of Motor Vehicle Administrators (AAMVA)
- American Automobile Association (AAA)
- American School Counselors Association (ASCA)
- Association of Middle Level Educators (AMLE)
- Classroom Champions
- Department of Transportation
- Governors Highway Safety Association
- Lyft
- Mothers Against Drunk Driving (MADD)
- National Association of Student Personnel Administrators (NASPA)
- National Sheriffs Association (NSA)
- National Transportation Safety Board (NTSB)
- SAFE (Safety and Advocacy for Empowerment)
- Students Against Destructive Decisions (SADD)
- Substance Abuse and Mental Health Services (SAMHSA)
- The Ohio Department of Commerce’s Division of Liquor Control
- The Ohio Liquor Control Commission
- We Save Lives

== History ==
In 1991, a number of global beverage companies came together to fund Responsibility.org (originally The Century Council). The organization was founded to eliminate underage drinking, to eliminate drunk driving, and to educate and inform adults about alcohol, empowering them to make responsible choices and engage in conversations.

In 2003, the organization created “Ask, Listen, Learn,” with the help of educators and other organizations. It was designed as, and has remained, a free underage drinking prevention program that provides ways for adults to communicate with kids about alcohol use and its effect on their developing brains. The program has been updated several times since its launch.

In 2017, a report showed that drivers killed in car crashes were more likely to be impaired by drugs than alcohol. In response to this, there was a call for greater emphasis on the dangers of drug-impaired driving in addition to drunk driving. Responsibility.org provided $100,000 in grants to highway safety officer to help them implement Advanced Roadside Impaired Driving Enforcement training and Drug Recognition Expert programs.

In 2021, Responsibility.org celebrated its 30th anniversary. That same year the organization created the National Alliance to Stop Impaired Driving, a coalition focused on eliminating all forms of impaired driving, including multiple substance impaired driving.

In 2022, the organization engaged with artist Brandan "BMike" Odums to create artwork for its program, Ask, Listen, Learn: Kids and Alcohol Don't Mix. The artwork was also used to wrap a city bus in New Orleans, a decision made with the goal of raising awareness, encouraging conversations around alcohol's effect on the developing brain, and keeping kids alcohol-free. BMike was featured in one of Responsibility.org's Responsibility Starts With Me campaign videos.

In 2023, Responsibility.org invested around $9 million on its programs and initiatives supporting alcohol education and research, advocacy, and prevention education. That year, two different studies - an annual study from the University of Michigan and an NIH funded study - showed that teen alcohol use continued to decrease. It also found that lifetime abstention from alcohol, cannabis, and nicotine is at the highest levels ever recorded for 8th, 10th, and 12th graders.

=== Membership ===
Responsibility.org is open to all companies that are committed to alcohol responsibility. Current funding companies include Bacardi, Brown-Forman, Campari Group, Constellation Brands, DIAGEO, Edrington, Hotaling & Co, Mast-Jägermeister US, Moet Hennessy USA, Pernod Ricard, Suntory Global Spirits, Ole Smoky, LLC, and William Grant & Sons.

Additional partners include Southern Glazer's Wine & Spirits, Breakthru, DoorDash, Intoximeters, mindr, Smart Start, Republic National Distributing Company (RNDC), Waymo, American Distilling Institute, and Lionstone.

=== Legislative actions ===
In 2016, Responsibility.org hosted the "Recognizing Law Enforcement's Critical Role in the Fight Against Impaired Driving Event" at Capitol Hill. The event included a talk from Shaquille O'Neal, who was working with the nonprofit.

In 2021, Responsibility.org supported the passage of the Honoring Abbas Family Legacy to Terminate Drunk Driving (HALT) Act to stop impaired driving. The Act called for advanced drunk driving prevention technology. The Halt Act was passed in December as part of a larger infrastructure bill.

== Awards and recognition ==
Responsibility.org has been the recipient of various awards over the years. This has included honorable mentions from PR Daily Awards for Responsibility.org's influencer event in 2024 and social media campaign in 2022, and a 2024 WRAPPY Award for corporate sponsorship from the Washington Regional Alcohol Program.

== Name change ==
On April 2, 2014, The Century Council changed its name to the Foundation for Advancing Alcohol Responsibility, or Responsibility.org.

== See also ==
- Alcohol-related traffic crashes in the United States
- Drunk driving in the United States
