= Alcohol-related traffic crashes in the United States =

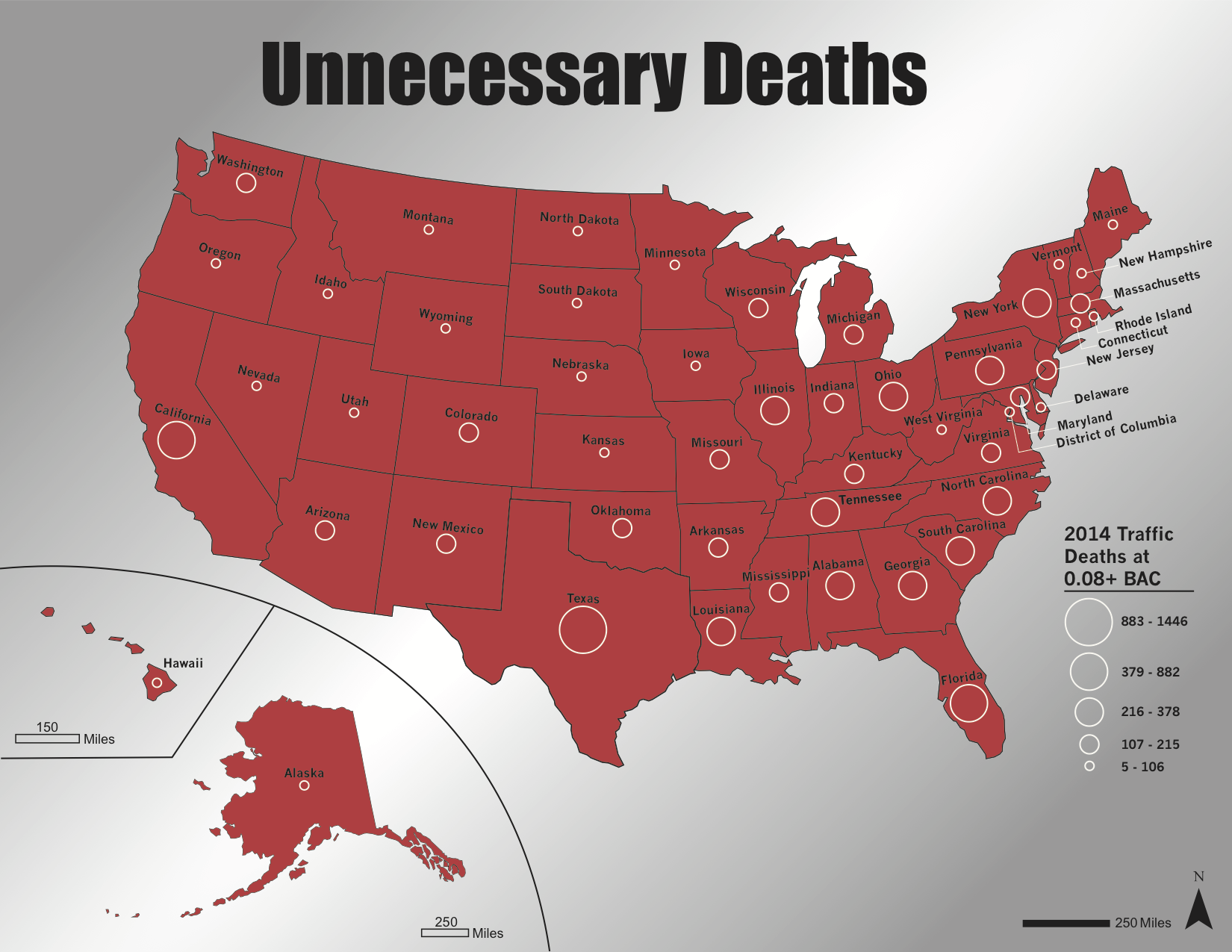
2014 Traffic Deaths due to crashes involving drivers at or above 0.08 BAC

Alcohol-related traffic crashes are defined by the United States National Highway Traffic Safety Administration (NHTSA) as alcohol-related if either a driver or a non-motorist had a measurable or estimated BAC of 0.01 g/dl or above.

This statistic includes all vehicular collisions (including bicycle and motorcycle) in which any alcohol has been consumed, or believed to have been consumed, by the driver, a passenger or a pedestrian associated with the incident. Thus, if a person who has consumed alcohol and has stopped for a red light is rear-ended by a completely sober but inattentive driver, the incident is listed as alcohol-related, although alcohol had nothing to do with causing the collision. Furthermore, if a sober motorist hits a drunk pedestrian, the incident is also listed as alcohol-related. Alcohol-related collisions are often mistakenly confused with alcohol-caused collisions. Some have criticized the NHTSA for compiling this statistic since it may give the impression that drunk drivers cause a much higher percentage of collisions and does not accurately reflect the problem of drunk driving in the United States.

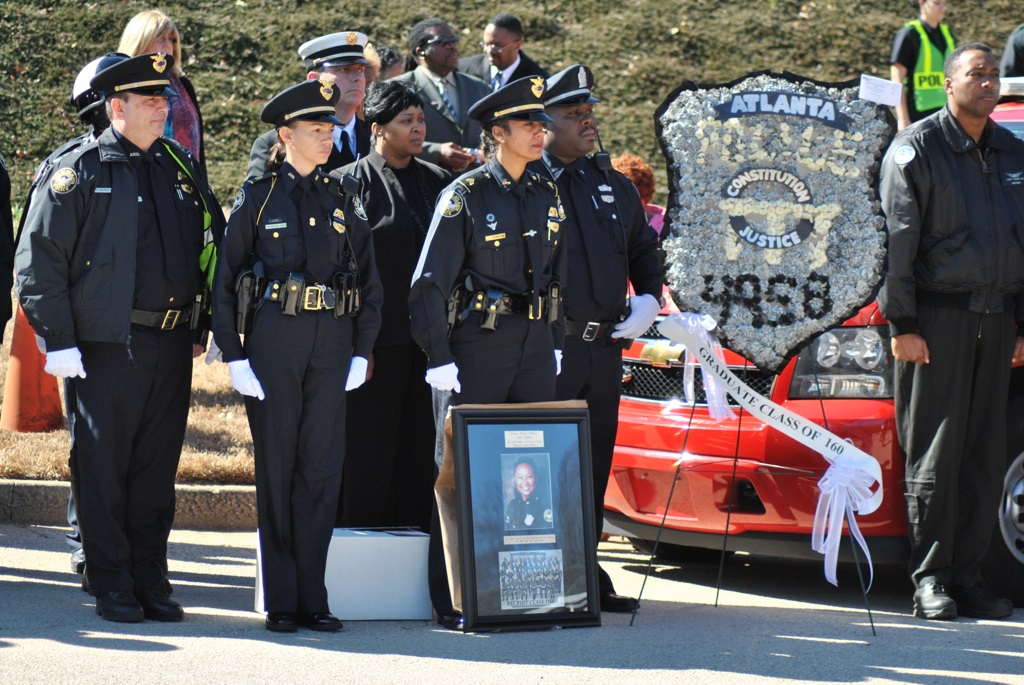
Senior Police Officer Gail Denise Thomas was killed by a drunk driver.

Nationally, 12.8% of all drivers involved in fatal collisions during 2013 are known to have been intoxicated according to the blood alcohol concentration (BAC laws) of their state. This number is based on a systematic examination of the official records of every incident involving a fatality during that year in the US. However, a majority of fatalities resulting from car crashes involving alcohol are from sober drivers who are hit by drunk drivers.

The higher number (about 40%) commonly reported refers to collisions defined as alcohol-related as estimated by the National Highway Traffic Safety Administration.

Each year, The Century Council, a national non-profit organization funded by a group of alcohol manufacturers, compiles a document of alcohol-related traffic fatalities. Between 1991 and 2013, the rate of alcohol-related traffic fatalities (ARTF) per 100,000 population has decreased 52% nationally, and 79% among youth under 21.

== NHTSA data ==
According to NHTSA, the 50 US states, the District of Columbia, and Puerto Rico all have BAC limits of 0.08 g/dL or lower.

In 2016, in the USA, 10,497 people were killed in crashes involving alcohol-impaired drivers; this represents 28 percent of all traffic-related fatalities. Sixty-two percent of the people killed in such a crash were drivers, 29% occupants, and 9% non-occupants.

This data is described as

Total includes fatalities in crashes in which there was no driver (includes motorcycle riders) present.

In 2016, the states with the fewest fatalities due to alcohol-impaired drivers were Utah and Mississippi, with 128 and 52 killed (19%).

Among drivers with BAC levels of 0.08% or higher involved in fatal crashes, 75% are aged between 21 and 44.

Of all motorcyclists killed in crashes, 25% had BACs of 0.08% or greater.

== See also ==
- Foundation for Advancing Alcohol Responsibility, funded by a group of distillers
- Mothers Against Drunk Driving
- Transportation safety in the United States
