= MADD Canada =

Nonprofit organization to stop impaired driving in Canada

- Founded: 1989
- Founder: John Bates
- Headquarters: Oakville, Ontario, Canada
- Area served: Canada
- Key people: Steven Sullivan (CEO)
- Products: Public Service Announcements
- Website: madd.ca

MADD Canada is the Canadian arm of Mothers Against Drunk Driving. Its stated purpose is to stop impaired driving and to support victims. MADD Canada operates public awareness and education programs which focus on preventing impaired driving. Local activities are carried out by chapters in approximately 100 communities across Canada.

The organization also supports a number of federal and provincial initiatives aimed at reducing incidents of impaired driving, including changes to Criminal Code provisions against drunk driving, and a zero blood alcohol content limit for drivers under 21.

== Programs ==
In July 2021, MADD Canada CEO Andrew Murie called for Nova Scotia Premier Iain Rankin to take stronger action against drunk driving following Rankin's apology for a previously undisclosed conviction for impaired driving. Previously, Saskatchewan Premier Scott Moe and British Columbia Premier Gordon Campbell had taken steps to curb impaired driving following revelations of their own previous charges.

In December 2022, MADD Canada partnered with the Fredericton Police Force on their annual Project Red Ribbon campaign, aiming to promote sober driving during the holiday season. In the same month, Fredericton police reported a four-year high in impaired driving arrests, totalling 199 as of December 16, up from 166 in 2021.

== Allegations about fundraising ==
On December 9, 2006, an article in the Toronto Star alleged that about 19 cents of every dollar the organization raised went to victim services and combatting drunk driving. In response to this allegation, MADD Canada temporarily suspended its fundraising activities.

MADD CEO Andrew Murie argued that MADD's outreach campaigns also served to warn individual members of the Canadian public that impaired driving can lead to criminal charges, serious injury, and death and was thus not purely fundraising. Murie stated that the Canada Revenue Agency had audited MADD Canada in 2002-2003 and gave them a "clean bill of health". However, according to the Star's Kevin Donavan, a letter from the Agency dated March 3, 2003, stated that MADD had conflated fundraising with charity, and warned MADD not to count fundraising expenses as charitable expenditures.

== See also ==
- Impaired driving in Canada
