= Charles A. Hurley =

American road safety campaigner

Charles A. Hurley, commonly known as Chuck Hurley, is an American road safety campaigner. He was the Mothers Against Drunk Driving CEO from 2005 to 2010.

== Early career ==
Hurley has a BA in Political Science from Dickinson College (1967). He was a US naval intelligence officer in Taipei, Taiwan, working as a Sino-Soviet analyst (1968–1970), then was the special assistant to the mayor of Wilmington, Delaware (1970–1971). He worked for the Republican politician William A. Steiger as his legislative assistant then director from 1971 to 1977.

== Road safety ==
He was with the National Safety Council for around 20 years from 1977, and was senior vice-president of communications for the Insurance Institute for Highway Safety from 1989 to 1996. He helped introduce the Click It or Ticket campaign in North Carolina when he was executive director of the Air Bag and Seat Belt Safety Campaign.

=== MADD ===
He volunteered with MADD since 1980. When he became CEO of MADD in March 2005 (a position, which, according to its 990 form, did not exist in 2003), his aim was to reduce turnover in the organisation. One of his proposals was for all people convicted of a DUI to be made to use an ignition interlock device. Hurley was considered for nomination in April 2009 by President Obama to run the National Highway Traffic Safety Administration (NHTSA), but Hurley withdrew his name. He retired in June 2010 and was replaced as CEO by Kimberly Earle. In his last year with MADD he was paid $248,082 and was further compensated $18,213 for "other compensation from the organization and related organizations." From 2005 to 2009 Hurley was compensated $1,182,803 not including other benefits such as expense accounts or pension contributions.
