= DUI laws in California =

Driving under the influence (California)

California State Legislature
- Citation: California Vehicle Code § 23152 et seq.
- Effective: January 1, 2014
- Administered by: California Department of Motor Vehicles (administrative)
- Status: In force

Driving under the influence (DUI) occurs when a person operates a motor vehicle while under the influence of drugs or alcohol, or when the driver has a blood alcohol level of 0.08 or greater. Minors and young adults aged 18–20 can be charged with impaired driving based on blood alcohol levels of 0.01 or higher, and CDL license holders can be charged based upon blood alcohol levels of 0.04 or higher.

== Overview ==
Like almost every other state, California has a "per se" BAC limit of 0.08% pursuant to California Vehicle Code Section 23152(b); and based on the aforementioned federal legislation, a lower limit of 0.04% for drivers holding commercial drivers licenses (CDL). California also has a limit of 0.01% for drivers who are under 21 or on probation for previous DUI offenses pursuant to California Vehicle Code Sections 23136 and 23140. California also makes it illegal for persons who are on probation for a DUI conviction to drive with a blood or breath alcohol concentration of 0.01% or greater pursuant to Vehicle Code Section 23154. While the existence of a BAC of 0.01% or greater may not always result in prosecution for driving under the influence, it will subject such drivers to a one or two-year suspension through an administrative action by the California Department of Motor Vehicles. If that same person has a BAC of 0.08% or greater, it will prompt what is referred to as a "dual action", meaning a suspension for driving with a BAC of 0.08% or greater and a suspension for driving with a BAC of 0.01% or greater while on DUI Probation.

In California, in Mercer v. DMV (1991) 53 Cal.3d 753, the California State Supreme Court contrasted the term "drive", commonly understood to require volitional movement of the vehicle, with the term "driver", defined in California Vehicle Code § 305 as one who is either driving or in actual physical control. The court pointed out that the phrase "actual physical control" does not appear anywhere in the drunk driving offense statutes. Further, the court noted that since "driver" is defined as one who drives or is in actual physical control, the two terms (drive vs. actual physical control) must have different meanings. Construing these penal statutes strictly, rather than broadly, as is required by Keeler v. Superior Court of Amador County (1970) 2 Cal.3d 619, 631, the court held that mere actual physical control is not enough to constitute driving. Therefore, the term: "drive", at least for purposes of the drunk driving statutes, requires volitional movement of the vehicle. In coming to this conclusion, the California Supreme Court held that in everyday usage the phrase, "to drive a vehicle", is understood as requiring evidence of volitional movement of a vehicle. Numerous dictionary definitions-including Webster's Third New International Dictionary (1981), cited by the Court of Appeal in the case that led to the California Supreme Court's review of this case, support a definition of "drive" that includes movement. (See, e.g., Id., at p. 692.) fn. 5. The Mercer Court held that it believed that these definitions are consistent with the usual and ordinary understanding of that term, and suggest the sense in which the word was intended by the Legislature in the present context.

== Statute ==
California's "catch-all" provision was previously found in California Vehicle Code Section 23152(a); however new statutes that were made effective on January 1, 2014, two new sections were created to make sections specifically addressing those charged with driving under the influence of drugs, (which includes prescription medications if it can be shown that those medications impaired the driver), and driving under the influence of alcohol and drugs.

- CVC 23152(a): It is unlawful for any person who is under the influence of any alcoholic beverage or drug, or under the combined influence of any alcoholic beverage and drug, to drive a vehicle
- CVC 23152(b): It is unlawful for any person who has 0.08 percent or more, by weight, of alcohol in his or her blood to drive a vehicle.
- CVC 23152(e): It is unlawful for a person who is under the influence of any drug to drive a vehicle
- CVC 23152(f): It is unlawful for a person who is under the combined influence of any alcoholic beverage and drug to drive a vehicle.

== Penalties ==
The consequences of being charged with DUI include both criminal and administrative penalties.

=== Administrative penalties ===
Administrative penalties are imposed by a government agency, such as the Department of Motor Vehicles, and may potentially be imposed even if a person is not convicted of DUI.

When a driver is charged with DUI in California, the driver's license is revoked and a 30-day temporary license issued in its place. The driver may ask for a hearing by the Department of Motor Vehicles (DMV) for extension of the temporary license or authorization to apply for a new permanent license; in most cases the outcome of such a hearing is a determination that the temporary license may be used only in traveling to and from work until the case is resolved. (If no hearing is requested then all driving privileges expire at the end of the 30 days, until the judge in the criminal case determines the driver's final disposition.) Separate from the DMV's determination are any criminal charges; in conjunction with sentencing the presiding judge will determine any restriction, revocation, or restoration of the accused driving privileges. Attorney's fees for a DUI case typically from $2,000 to $6,000.

=== Criminal penalties ===
If a person in California is convicted of DUI, the court may impose the following penalties:

==== Minimum penalties for first conviction ====
- Approximately $1800 in fines
- Average time for first offense: 48 hours, less time served at initial arrest until release on own cognizance.
- 90-day restricted license to go to and from work, and/or to a certified 3-month alcohol treatment program
- Attend a 3-month mandatory California sanctioned alcohol treatment program costing $500
- Driving privileges suspended after 30 days from the arrest date (imposed by the DMV)
- Auto insurance must now carry an SR-22 insurance certificate for 3 years. Additional insurance fees will be required
- 3 – 5 years probation
- Ignition interlock installed in offender's vehicle for 6 months, or one year of driving with a restricted license.
- Average total fines, fees, alcohol treatment program, increased auto insurance, and cost of a DUI defense attorney $7,000-$11,000.

==== Minimum penalties for a second offense ====
(note: It is considered a second offense if the accused is arrested for a DUI within 10 years of the first offense)

- 10 days in jail
- $1,800 in fines
- 18-30 month California State sanctioned alcohol treatment program costing an additional $1,800
- installation of an interlock device on all vehicles owned by the offender
- Driving privileges revoked for one year from the arrest date (imposed by the DMV)
- Drastically increased auto insurance rates, and extended SR-22 insurance certificate required
- Up to 10 years probation

==== Minimum penalties for a third offense ====
- 120 days in jail
- $1,800 in fines (may go up to $18,000)
- Revocation of driver's license for 3 years
- Completion of a 30-month alcohol multi-offender program
- Drastically increased insurance coverage ranging in the thousands of dollars, if and when driving privileges are restored
- If charged as felony: forfeiture of the offender's vehicle indefinitely.

== See also ==
- List of alcohol laws of the United States
- Drunk driving in the United States, including Investigation and arrest subsection
