= Insurance King =

Illinois-based insurance agency

Insurance King Agency, Inc.

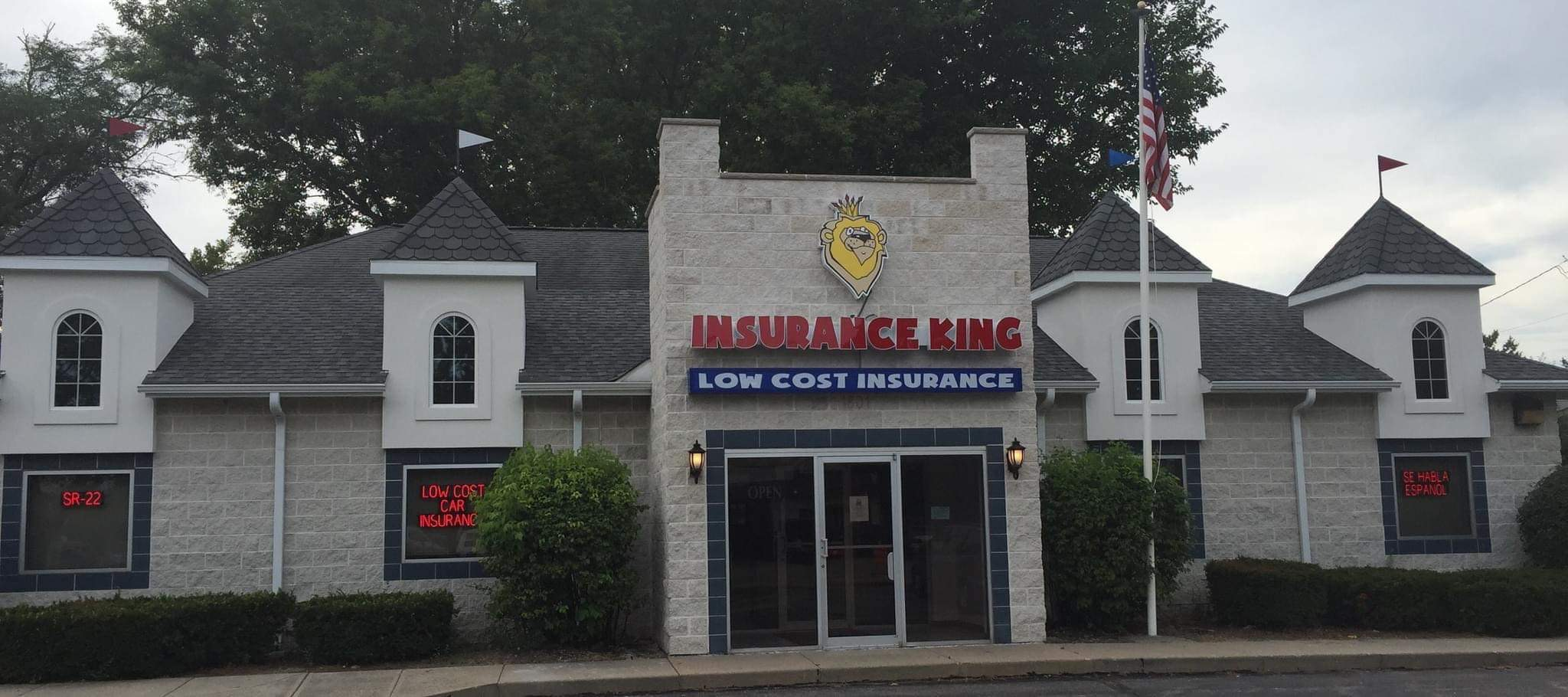
- Formerly: Nyman Advisors, Inc. (2000-2001)
- Company type: Private
- Industry: Car insurance agency
- Founded: 2000, 21 years ago Rockford, Illinois
- Founder: Daniel Block; Scot Nyman
- Headquarters: 127 N. Alpine Road, Rockford, Illinois, United States
- Number of locations: 6 (2 more in future)
- Area served: Illinois, Indiana, Iowa, Kansas, Mississippi, Missouri, Ohio, Tennessee, Texas, & Wisconsin
- Key people: Daniel Block (CEO)
- Products: Auto and motorcycle insurance, SR-22 insurance
- Owner: Daniel Block
- Website: www.insuranceking.com

Insurance King Agency, Inc., dba Insurance King, is an Illinois-based insurance agency.

The agency is headquartered in Rockford, Illinois and is currently owned by Daniel Block. The agency was founded in 2000 as Nyman Advisors, Inc. by Scot Nyman. Block and Nyman renamed the agency "Insurance King" in 2001. The agency handles auto and motorcycle insurance, along with SR-22s and roadside assistance.

== History ==
In 2000 Block left his job as an insurance agent to work for a competing agency, when he learned that other insurance carriers had lower insurance rates. In the same year, Block ran into Scot Nyman, who had recently started his own agency. While having lunch with Nyman, Block decided to leave his employer work for Nyman's agency, Nyman Advisors, Inc.

In 2001 a salesman complimented the agency to Block, calling him "The Insurance King". The name stuck, and he and Nyman would eventually change the name of the agency to "Insurance King".

In March 2003 Block bought the agency from Nyman, making Block the sole owner of Insurance King.

In 2003 Block testified as a witness for SR-22 insurance, as the state of Illinois was looking to implement a mandatory insurance law within the state. Block offered ideas to prevent fraudulent SR-22 insurance filings and help to transition to an electronic filing process.

In 2012 Block created an expansion project for the agency, which included expanding offering coverage to other, nearby states to Illinois. The plan was eventually implemented in 2013. The agency reported doubling its size three years in a row.

In February 2013 Insurance King bought the Lighthouse Casualty Company, a carrier focused on teen and mid-twenties drivers, as one of their insurance carriers.

In 2018 the agency opened their first location outside of Rockford, a physical location in Peoria, Illinois. To help promote the opening, Block hired Saved by the Bell actor Dustin Diamond to appear in commercials promoting the new agency. Until his death from lung cancer in 2021, Diamond would appear in commercials for the agency to promote "minimum coverage," often trading on Diamond's character from Saved by the Bell, Screech.

In 2020 a series of Insurance King commercials parodying Tiger King went viral. The commercials featured actor Todd Bridges (playing Joe Exotic) and Tiger King stars Saff Saffery and John Reinke. The commercials featured Tiger King references, Joe Exotic quotes, and insults directed at Carole Baskin.

== Locations ==
Insurance King has six physical locations in the state of Illinois, with two more being built, which were planned to open sometime in 2022.

== Lawsuit ==
In 2020, Insurance King filed a lawsuit against Rancho Cucamonga, California-based company Just Auto Insurance, Inc. for "trademark infringement, unfair competition and false designation of origin under the Lanham Act". Insurance King claimed that Just Auto Insurance had been using a similar slogan and logo of Insurance King, even after a cease and desist letter. On June 14, 2021 a court decided in favor of Insurance King and ordered Just Auto to cease using the infringing slogan and anything else "confusingly similar" to the cartoon lion used to advertise Insurance King.

== NASCAR sponsorship ==
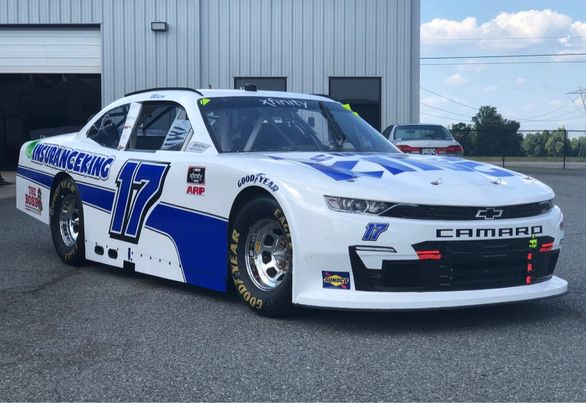
Josh Bilicki's car for the 2021 Skrewball Peanut Butter Whiskey 200 at The Glen, sponsored by Insurance King.

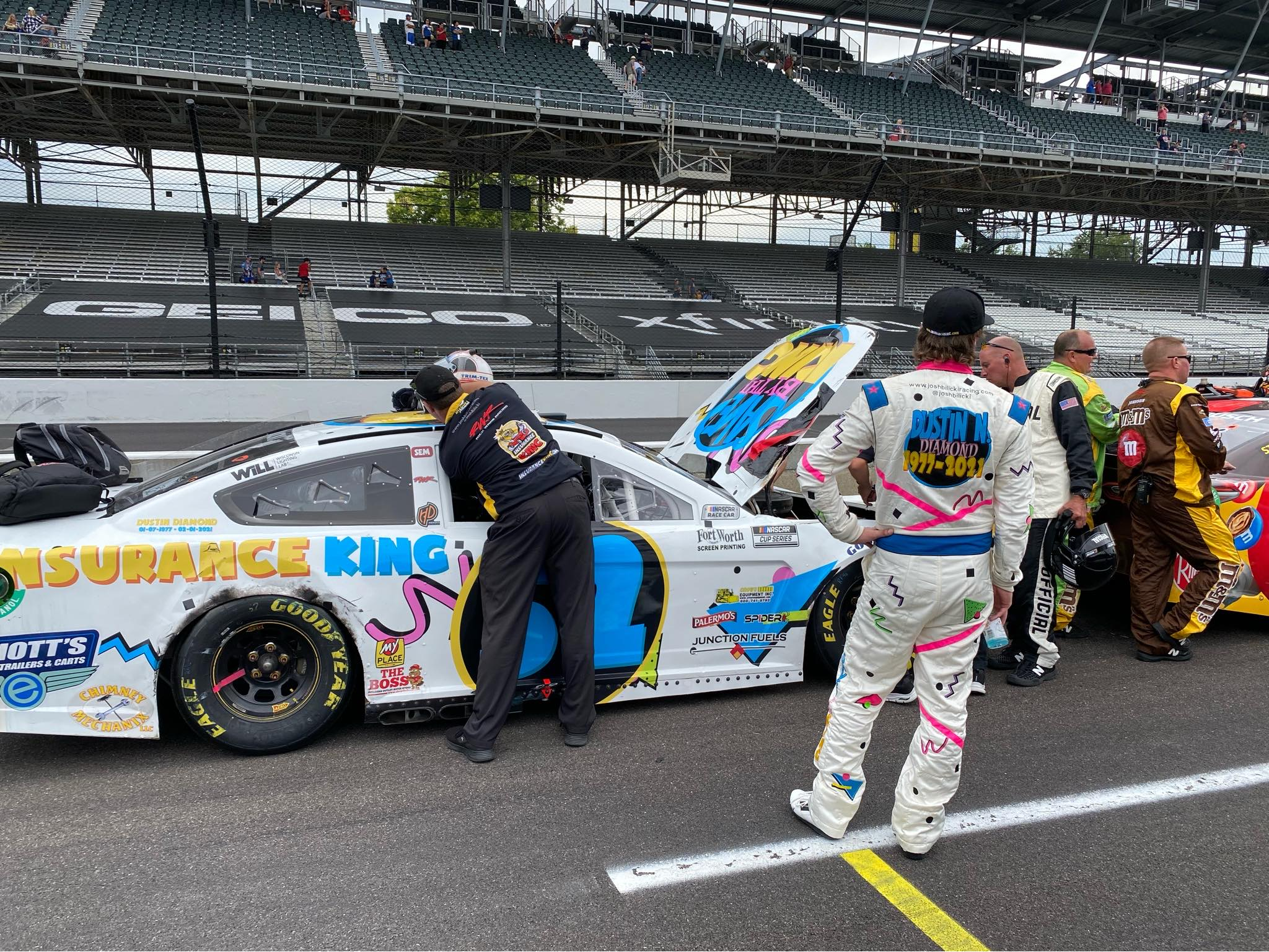
Insurance King's tribute car to Diamond. On the firesuit, it reads "Dustin N. Diamond 1977-2021".

In 2019, NASCAR driver Josh Bilicki sent a Facebook message to the agency, asking if they would sponsor him for the upcoming Chicagoland Speedway weekend. Insurance King agreed, becoming the first-ever insurance agency to ever sponsor a NASCAR car. The agency has continued to sponsor Bilicki with numerous special promotions such as = "hero cards" of Bilicki. After Dustin Diamond's death, Bilicki, ran a tribute car to him in the 2021 Verizon 200 at the Brickyard.
