= Driving under the influence =

Driving after consuming alcohol or drugs

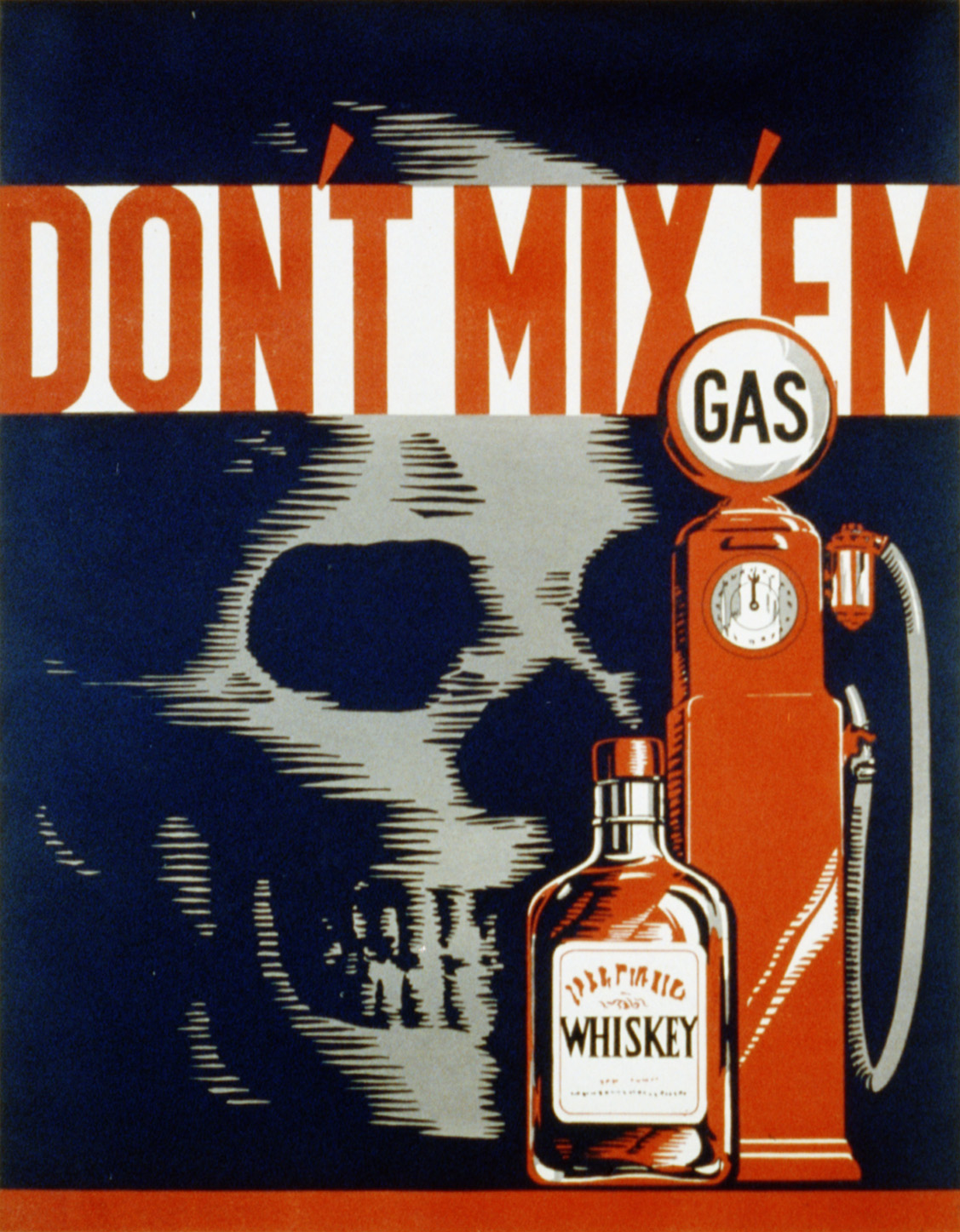
1937 poster warning American drivers against drunk driving

Driving under the influence (DUI) or driving while intoxicated (DWI) is the crime of driving, operating, or being in control of a vehicle while one is impaired from doing so safely by the effect of either alcohol (see drunk driving) or some other drug, whether recreational or prescription (see drug-impaired driving). Multiple other terms are used for the offense in various jurisdictions.

== Terminology ==
The name of the offense varies between jurisdictions and from legal to colloquial terminology. In many jurisdictions, the offense is termed "driving under the influence" [of alcohol or other drugs] (DUI), "driving under the influence of intoxicants" (DUII), "driving while impaired" (DWI), "impaired driving", "driving while intoxicated" (DWI), "operating while intoxicated" (OWI), "operating under the influence" (OUI), "operating [a] vehicle under the influence" (OVI), "drunk in charge" (DIC), or "over the prescribed limit" (OPL) (in the UK). Alcohol-related DUI is referred to as "drunk driving", "drunken driving", or "drinking and driving" (US), or "drink-driving" (UK/Ireland/Australia). Cannabis-related DUI may be termed "driving high", and more generally drug-related DUI may be referred to as "drugged driving", "driving under the influence of drugs" (DUID), or "drug-impaired driving".

In the United States, the specific criminal offense is usually called driving under the influence, but states may use other names for the offense including "driving while intoxicated" (DWI), "operating while impaired" (OWI) or "operating while ability impaired", and "operating a vehicle under the influence" (OVI).

== Definition ==
In typical usage of the terms DUI, DWI, OWI, and OVI, the offense consists of driving a vehicle while affected by alcohol or drugs. However, in the majority of US states, the criminal offense may not involve actual driving of the vehicle but rather may broadly include operating or being physically in control of a motor vehicle while under the influence, even if the person charged is not in the act of driving. For example, individuals found in the driver's seat of a car while intoxicated and holding the car keys, even while parked, may be charged with DUI because they are in control of the vehicle. In contrast, California only makes it illegal to drive a motor vehicle while under the influence, requiring actual "driving". "The distinction between these two terms is material, for it is generally held that the word 'drive,' as used in statutes of this kind, usually denotes movement of the vehicle in some direction, whereas the word 'operate' has a broader meaning so as to include not only the motion of the vehicle but also acts which engage the machinery of the vehicle that, alone or in sequence, will set in motion the motive power of the vehicle."

Many DUI laws also apply to motorcycling, boating, piloting aircraft, use of mobile farm machinery such as tractors and combine harvesters, riding horses or driving a horse-drawn vehicle, cycling, or skateboarding, possibly with different BAC level than regular driving. In some jurisdictions, there are separate charges depending on the vehicle used. In Washington state, for instance, BUI (bicycling under the influence) laws recognize that intoxicated cyclists are likely to primarily endanger themselves. Accordingly, law enforcement officers are empowered only to protect the cyclist by impounding the bicycle rather than filing DUI charges.

George Smith, a London taxi driver, ended up being the first person to be convicted of driving a motor vehicle while intoxicated, on September 10, 1897, under the "drunk in charge" provision of the 1872 Licensing Act. He was fined 20 shillings, which is equivalent to £112 in 2025.

== Alcohol ==
Table from the 2010 DrugScience study ranking various drugs (legal and illegal) based on statements by drug-harm experts. This study rated alcohol the most harmful drug overall, and the only drug more harmful to others than to the users themselves.

Drunk driving (or drink-driving in British English) is the act of driving under the influence of alcohol. A small increase in the blood alcohol content increases the relative risk of a motor vehicle crash. In the United States, alcohol is involved in 30% of all traffic fatalities. It is not known nationally how many people are killed each year in crashes involving drug-impaired drivers because of data limitations, but one study of drivers who were seriously injured in crashes found that 23.6% of drivers were positive for alcohol and 12.2% were positive solely for alcohol.

== Other drugs ==
For drivers suspected of drug-impaired driving, drug testing screens are typically performed in scientific laboratories so that the results will be admissible in evidence at trial. Due to the overwhelming number of impairing substances that are not alcohol, drugs are classified into different categories for detection purposes. Drug impaired drivers still show impairment during the battery of standardized field sobriety tests, but there are additional tests to help detect drug impaired driving. In the US, one study found that 25.8% of drivers seriously injured in crashes tested positive for cannabinoids, 13.6% tested positive solely for cannabinoids, and 24.6% tested positive for a drug other than alcohol or cannabis.

=== Recreational drugs ===
Drivers who have smoked or otherwise consumed cannabis products such as marijuana or hashish can be charged and convicted of impaired driving in some jurisdictions. A 2011 study in the B.C. Medical Journal stated that there "...is clear evidence that cannabis, like alcohol, impairs the psychomotor skills required for safe driving." The study stated that while "[c]annabis-impaired drivers tend to drive more slowly and cautiously than drunk drivers,... evidence shows they are also more likely to cause accidents than drug and alcohol-free drivers". A more recent 2023 study found that when compared to alcohol, "the impairment effect of marijuana on driving is relatively mild" since drivers using cannabis "drive slower, avoid overtaking other vehicles, and increase following distances." In Canada, police forces such as the Royal Canadian Mounted Police have "...specially trained drug recognition and evaluation [DRE] officers... [who] can detect whether or not a driver is drug impaired, by putting suspects through physical examinations and co-ordination tests. In 2014, in the Canadian province of Ontario, Bill 31, the Transportation Statute Law Amendment Act, was introduced to the provincial legislature. Bill 31 contains driver's license "...suspensions for those caught driving under the influence of drugs, or a combination of drugs and alcohol. Ontario police officers "...use Standard Field Sobriety Tests (SFSTs) and drug recognition evaluations to determine whether the officer believes the driver is under the influence of drugs." In the province of Manitoba, an "...officer can issue a physical coordination test. In B.C., the officer can further order a drug recognition evaluation by an expert, which can be used as evidence of drug use to pursue further charges."

In the US state of Colorado, the state government indicates that "[a]ny amount of marijuana consumption puts you at risk of driving impaired." Colorado law states that "drivers with five nanograms of active tetrahydrocannabinol (THC) in their whole blood can be prosecuted for driving under the influence (DUI). However, no matter the level of THC, law enforcement officers base arrests on observed impairment." In Colorado, if consumption of marijuana is impairing your ability to drive, "it is illegal for you to be driving, even if that substance is prescribed [by a doctor] or legally acquired."

=== Prescription medications ===
Prescription medications such as opioids and benzodiazepines often cause side effects such as excessive drowsiness, and, in the case of opioids, nausea. Other prescription drugs including antiepileptics and antidepressants are now also believed to have the same effect. In the last ten years, there has been an increase in motor vehicle crashes, and it is believed that the use of impairing prescription drugs has been a major factor. Workers are generally expected to notify their employer when prescribed such drugs to minimize the risk of motor vehicle crashes while at work.

If a worker who drives has a health condition which can be treated with opioids, it is generally recommended that person's doctor be told that driving is a part of the worker's duties and that the employer be notified that the worker could be treated with opioids. Experts have advised that workers not use impairing substances while driving or operating heavy machinery like forklifts or cranes. If the worker is to drive, the health care provider is generally expected not to give them opioids. If the worker is to take opioids, then their employer is generally expected to assign them work which is appropriate for their impaired state and not encourage them to use safety sensitive equipment.

== Testing ==
=== Field sobriety testing ===
Field sobriety tests are a battery of tests used by police officers to determine if a person suspected of impaired driving is intoxicated with alcohol or other drugs. FSTs are primarily used in the United States, to meet "probable cause for arrest" requirements (or the equivalent), necessary to sustain a DWI or DUI conviction based on a chemical blood alcohol test. In the US, field sobriety tests are voluntary; however, some states mandate commercial drivers accept preliminary breath tests (PBT).

=== Drug Evaluation and Classification program ===
The Drug Evaluation and Classification program is designed to detect a drug impaired driver and classify the categories of drugs present in their system. The procedures are used post-arrest to gather evidence for trial, rather than for probable cause, as they would be difficult to conduct at the scene.

Initially developed by the Los Angeles, California, Police Department in the 1970s, the DEC program breaks down detection into a twelve-step process that a government-certified Drug Recognition Expert (DRE) can use to determine the category or categories of drugs that a suspect is impaired by. The twelve steps are:

1. Breath Alcohol Test
2. Interview with arresting officer (who notes slurred speech, alcohol on breath, etc.)
3. Preliminary evaluation
4. Evaluation of the eyes
5. Psychomotor tests
6. Vital signs
7. Dark room examinations
8. Muscle tone
9. Injection sites (for injection of heroin or other drugs)
10. Interrogation of suspect
11. Opinion of the evaluator
12. Toxicological examination

DREs are qualified to offer expert testimony in court that pertains to impaired driving on drugs.

The DEC program is recognized by all fifty states in the U.S., Canada, and the United Kingdom and DRE training in the use of the twelve-step [MS1] process is scientifically validated by both laboratory and field studies.

=== Testing for cannabis ===
U.S. states prohibit the operation of a motor vehicle while under the influence of drugs, including marijuana. For example, in Illinois it is illegal to operate a motor vehicle with a THC level of 5 nanograms or more per milliliter of whole blood or 10 nanograms or more per milliliter of other bodily substances. Under that law, an individual can be arrested for driving under influence of cannabis at any THC level, including under the per se legal limits if an Officer believes the individual is impaired by cannabis.

It can be important to perform testing soon after a traffic stop, as THC plasma levels decline significantly after the passage of one or two hours. A number of companies are developing roadside THC breathalyzers that may be used by the police to help identify drivers impaired by the use of marijuana. Some nations use saliva swabs to test for THC levels at roadside, but questions remain about the reliability of saliva testing.

== Other charges ==
=== Child endangerment ===
In the US state of Colorado, impaired drivers may be charged with child endangerment if they are arrested for DUI with minor children in the vehicle.

=== Wet reckless ===
"Wet reckless" is a term used informally when a driver takes a plea bargain, agreeing to plead guilty to reckless driving in exchange for the elimination of the drunk driving charge. In California, a driver may not be charged or arrested for "wet reckless" driving, and the sole function of the charge is as a possible disposition following a plea bargain for a driver charged with DUI.

=== Penalties ===
In the case of a crash, car insurance may be automatically declared invalid for the intoxicated driver; the drunk driver would be fully responsible for damages. In the American system, a citation for driving under the influence also causes a major increase in car insurance premiums.

The German model serves to reduce the number of crashes by identifying unfit drivers and revoking their licenses until their fitness to drive has been established again. The medical-psychological assessment works for a prognosis of the fitness for drive in future, has an interdisciplinary basic approach, and offers the chance of individual rehabilitation to the offender.

== Worldwide ==
The "Prohibiting Drinking and Driving" sign in Taiwan. According to the law, all alcoholic products in Taiwan must attach this sign to the product label.

The laws relating to DUI vary significantly between countries, particularly the thresholds at which a person is charged with a crime. In many countries, sobriety checkpoints (roadblocks of police cars where drivers are checked), driver's license suspensions, fines, and prison sentences for DUI offenders are used as part of an effort to deter impaired driving. In addition, many countries have prevention campaigns that use advertising to make people aware of the danger of driving while impaired and the potential fines and criminal charges, discourage impaired driving, and encourage drivers to take taxis or public transport home after using alcohol or other drugs. In some jurisdictions, a bar or restaurant that serves an impaired driver may face civil liability for injuries caused by that driver. In some countries, non-profit advocacy organizations, a well-known example being Mothers Against Drunk Driving (MADD) run their own publicity campaigns against drunk or impaired driving.

=== US federal regulation ===
The United States Department of Transportation (USDOT) regulates many occupations and industries, and has a zero tolerance policy pertaining to the use of cannabis for any regulated employee whether he or she is on-duty or off-duty. Regardless of any State's DUI Statutes and DMV Administrative Penalties, a Commercial Driver's License "CDL" holder will have their CDL suspended for 1-year for a DUI arrest and will have their CDL revoked for life if they are subsequently arrested for driving impaired.

=== European Union ===
In 2025, during the negotiation of the new rules for the European driving license, an EU-wide two-years probationary period was proposed without alcohol, but member states may have to apply stricter rules for driving under the influence of alcohol or drugs.

A 2026 study by Motointegrator, drawing on the European Survey of Road Users' Attitudes (ESRA3, 2023) and data from the European Transport Safety Council (ETSC), found considerable variation in self-reported drink-driving across EU member states. Among 22 European countries surveyed, the share of drivers who reported driving above the legal limit in the past 30 days ranged from 24.1% in Luxembourg and 19.0% in Belgium to as low as 4.2% in Poland. The study further cited ETSC estimates that if all drivers across the EU complied with existing BAC limits, approximately 6,500 lives per year could be saved.

== See also ==
- Alcoholism
- Alcohol-related crime
- Breathalyzer
- Designated driver
- Driving laws
- Drug–impaired driving
- Drunk drivers
- Drunk walking
- DUI laws in California
- DWI court
- Fetal alcohol spectrum disorder
- Mothers Against Drunk Driving (MADD)
- Mobile phones and driving safety
- National Motorists Association
- Open-container law
- Responsible drug use
- Driver's license: point system
- Zero tolerance
