= Drunk driving in the United States =

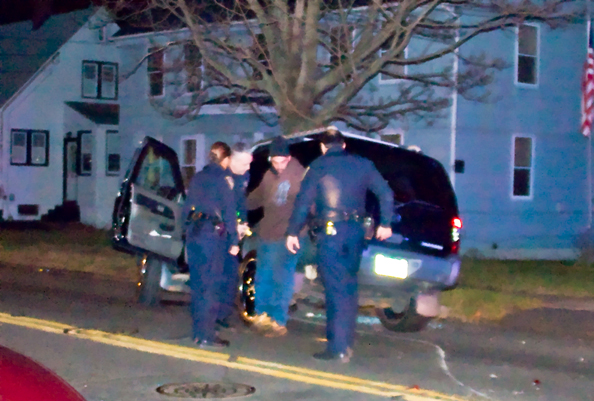
Police officers in Connecticut conduct a field sobriety test on a suspected drunk driver, December 2008

Drunk driving is the act of operating a motor vehicle with the operator's ability to do so impaired as a result of alcohol consumption, or with a blood alcohol level in excess of the legal limit. In most states, for drivers 21 years or older, driving with a blood alcohol concentration (BAC) of 0.08% or higher is illegal. For drivers under 21 years old, the legal limit is lower, with state limits ranging from 0.00 to 0.02. Stricter BAC limits apply when operating boats, airplanes, or commercial vehicles. Among other names, the criminal offense of drunk driving may be called driving under the influence (DUI), driving while intoxicated or impaired (DWI), operating (a) vehicle under the influence of alcohol (OVI), or operating while impaired (OWI).

== Notability ==
=== Prevalence ===
According to the Bureau of Justice Statistics, approximately 1.5 million drunk driving arrests were made nationwide in 1996. In 1997 an estimated 513,200 DUI offenders were under correctional supervision, down from 593,000 in 1990 and up from 270,100 in 1986.

The Bureau of Justice Statistics estimated that in 1996 local law enforcement agencies made 1,467,300 arrests nationwide for driving under the influence of alcohol, 1 out of every 10 arrests for all crimes in the U.S., compared to 1.9 million such arrests during the peak year in 1983, accounting for 1 out of every 80 licensed drivers in the U.S. This represented a 220% increase in DUI arrests from 1970 to 1986, while the number of licensed drivers increased by just 42% in the same period.

The arrest rate for alcohol-related offenses among Native Americans was more than double that for the total population during 1996, and almost 4 in 10 Native Americans held in local jails had been charged with a public order offense, most commonly driving while intoxicated. In 2012, 29.1 million people admitted to driving under the influence of alcohol.

Recent analysis has shown cities in which ride sharing services operate show mixed results as to whether the availability of those services affects rates of impaired driving.

=== Traffic collisions, injuries and fatalities ===
Percentage of US traffic collision fatalities where driver blood alcohol level was 0.01 and above, 1999–2012

The risk of having a traffic collision increases with a higher BAC.

The National Highway Traffic Safety Administration (NHTSA) estimates that about 18,000 people died in 2006 from alcohol-related collisions, representing 40% of total traffic deaths in the US. Over the decade 2001–2010, this rate showed only a 3% variation, and no trend.

Drivers with a BAC of 0.10% are 6 to 12 times more likely to get into a fatal collision or injury than drivers without positive blood alcohol. The NHTSA states 275,000 were injured in alcohol-related collisions in 2003. Approximately 60% of the BAC values for motor vehicle collisions are missing or unknown. To analyze what they believe is the complete data, statisticians estimate BAC information.

The NHTSA defines fatal collisions as "alcohol-related" if they believe the driver, a passenger, or non-motorist (such as a pedestrian or pedal cyclist) had a blood alcohol content (BAC) of 0.01% or greater. The NHTSA defines nonfatal collisions as alcohol-related if the crash report indicates evidence of alcohol present, even if no driver or occupant was tested for alcohol. The NHTSA specifically notes that alcohol-related does not necessarily mean a driver or non-occupant was tested for alcohol and that the term does not indicate a collision or fatality was caused by the presence of alcohol. If anyone involved in the crash (even a passenger) has a BAC of 0.01% or greater, then the NHTSA classifies the crash as alcohol-related. Alcohol-related injuries were estimated at 275,000 in 2003.

According to NTSB, 100,000 people have died in alcohol-impaired driving crashes between the NTSB issued its 2013 Reaching Zero report and 2022.

== Laws and regulations ==
For the most part, DUI or DWI are synonymous terms that represent the criminal offense of operating (or in some jurisdictions merely being in physical control of) a motor vehicle while being under the influence of alcohol or drugs or a combination of both. The key inquiry focuses on whether the driver's faculties were impaired by the substance that was consumed. The detection and successful prosecution of drivers impaired by prescription medication or illegal drugs can therefore be difficult. Breathalyzers have been developed for the purpose of administering roadside or laboratory tests that can detect the actual level of a controlled substance in an individual's body.

=== History ===
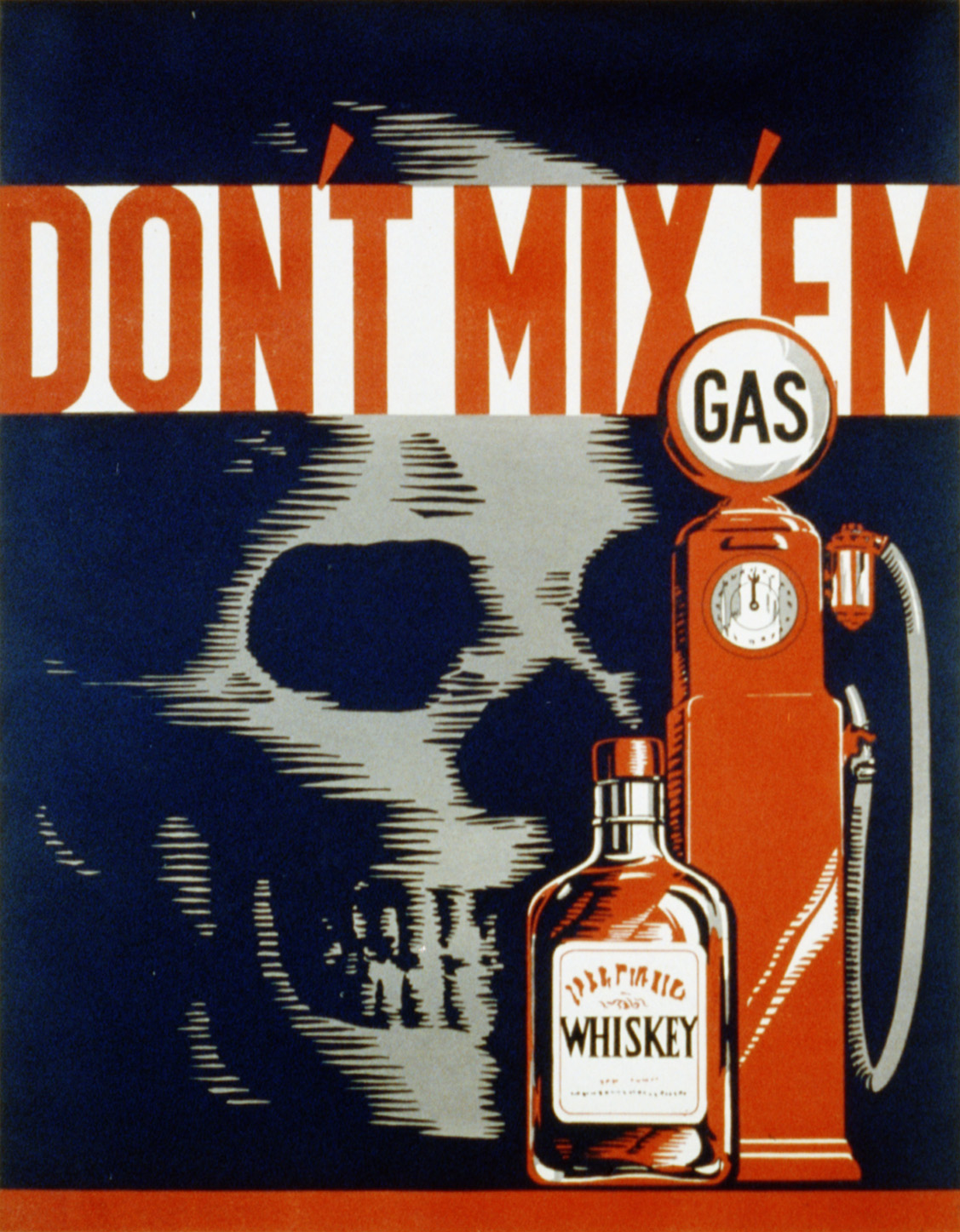
1937 WPA drunk driving poster

New Jersey enacted the first law that specifically criminalized driving an automobile while intoxicated, in 1906. The New Jersey statute provided that "[n]o intoxicated person shall drive a motor vehicle." Violation of this provision was punishable by a fine of up to $500, or a term of up to 60 days in county jail.

Early laws, such as that enacted in New Jersey, required proof of a state of intoxication with no specific definition of what level of inebriation qualified. The first generally accepted legal BAC limit was 0.15%. New York, for example, which had enacted a prohibition on driving while intoxicated in 1910, amended this law in 1941 to provide that it would constitute prima facie evidence of intoxication when an arrested person was found to have a BAC of 0.15 percent or higher, as ascertained through a test administered within two hours of arrest.

In 1938, the American Medical Association created a "Committee to Study Problems of Motor Vehicle Accidents". At the same time, the National Safety Council set up a "Committee on Tests for Intoxication".

In the US, most of the laws and penalties were greatly enhanced starting in the late 1970s, and through the 1990s, largely due to pressure from groups like Mothers Against Drunk Driving (MADD) and Students Against Destructive Decisions (SADD) and activists like Candy Lightner whose 13-year-old daughter Cari was killed by a drunk driver. Zero tolerance laws were enacted which criminalized driving a vehicle with 0.01% or 0.02% BAC for drivers under 21. This is true even in Puerto Rico, despite maintaining a legal drinking age of 18. Research in the American Economic Review suggests that sanctions imposed at BAC thresholds are effective in reducing repeat drunk driving.

On May 14, 2013, the National Transportation Safety Board recommended that all 50 states lower the benchmark for determining when a driver is legally drunk from 0.08 blood-alcohol content to 0.05. The idea is part of an initiative to eliminate drunk driving, which accounts for about a third of all road deaths.

In 2022, this BAC reduction was implemented by Utah with success when some states failed and other did not try to implement BAC reduction.

In 2026, Nevada implemented Assembly Bill 4 (AB4), also known as the Safe Streets and Neighborhoods Act, which made harsher penalties for DUI offenses. Under this new law, drivers whose DUI offense results in death now face up to 25 years in prison for a first offense with no prior DUI convictions, and mandatory minimum terms of five years for those with one or two prior offenses, in addition to fines ranging from $2,000 to $5,000.

=== Federal law ===
After the passage of federal legislation, the legal limit for commercial drivers is now set at 0.04%. The Federal Motor Carrier Safety Administration (FMCSA) regulation prohibits those who hold a commercial driver's license from driving with an alcohol concentration of 0.04 or greater. A commercial driver with an alcohol concentration of 0.02 or greater, but less than 0.04, must be removed from duty for 24 hours.

In 2016, the Supreme Court of the United States, in Birchfield v. North Dakota, held that both breath tests and blood tests constitute a search under the Fourth Amendment, concluding that requiring breath tests is constitutional without a search warrant; however, requiring more intrusive blood tests involving piercing the skin is not, as the goal of traffic safety can be obtained by less invasive means.

=== State law ===
In construing the terms DUI, DWI, OWI and OVI, some states make it illegal to drive a motor vehicle while under the influence or driving while intoxicated while others indicate that it is illegal to operate a motor vehicle. There is a split of authority across the country regarding this issue. Some states permit enforcement of DUI, DWI, and OWI/OVI statutes based on "operation and control" of a vehicle, while others require actual "driving". "The distinction between these terms is material, for it is generally held that the word 'drive,' as used in statutes of this kind, usually denotes movement of the vehicle in some direction, whereas the word 'operate' has a broader meaning so as to include not only the motion of the vehicle, but also acts which engage the machinery of the vehicle that, alone or in sequence, will set in motion the motive power of the vehicle."

All states in the U.S. designate a "per se" blood or breath alcohol level as the threshold point for an independent criminal offense. This is often referred to as the "legal limit". It is a permissive presumption of guilt where the person's BAC is 0.08% or greater (units of milligrams per deciliter, representing 8 g of alcohol in 10 liters of blood). Some states (e.g., Colorado) include a lesser charge, sometimes referred to as "driving while ability impaired" that may apply to individuals with a 0.05% or above, but less than the 0.08% per se limit for the more serious charge.

All states have a "catch-all" provision designed to cover those circumstances where the person is below 0.08%, but the person still appears impaired by definition of law. These types of "catch-all" statutes cover situations involving a person under the influence of drugs or under the combined influence of alcohol and drugs. With the advent of the legalization of marijuana, these catch-all provisions cover those prosecutions pursuing those charged with driving under the influence of drugs or even drugs and alcohol.

All US states have implied consent laws which state that a licensed driver has given their consent to an evidential breathalyzer or similar manner of determining blood alcohol concentration; however, in order to sustain a conviction based on evidence from a chemical test, probable cause for arrest must be demonstrated. Field sobriety tests (FSTs or SFSTs) and preliminary breath tests (PBTs) are often used to obtain such probable cause evidence, necessary for arrest or invoking implied consent.

Every state has enhanced penalties for refusing to submit to an Implied Consent Test pursuant to the State's Implied Consent Laws. In California, refusing to submit to a test of one's breath or blood upon being arrested for driving under the influence carries an additional punishment of a one-year license suspension pursuant to California Vehicle Code Section 13558(c)(1). Some states have passed laws that impose criminal penalties based upon principles of implied consent. However, in 2016, the Kansas Supreme Court ruled that Kansans who refuse to submit to either a breath or blood test in DUI investigations cannot be criminally prosecuted for that refusal. The court found unconstitutional a state law making it a crime to refuse such a test when no court-ordered warrant exists. In its 6-1 ruling, the court found that the tests were in essence searches and the law punishes people for exercising their constitutional right to be free from unreasonable searches and seizures.

=== Bicycle DUI ===
Approximately twenty to thirty states have criminalized impaired riding of a bicycle, whereas others have no sanctions relevant to cycling. Most such laws extend driving laws to all vehicles ("all vehicles" as opposed to "motor vehicles"), but a few address impaired bike riding separately. In some states, enhanced penalties are automobile-specific. Some states, notably Oregon, do not extend the implied consent law to cyclists. While police activities targeting impaired cyclists are rare, a cyclist could encounter police in a circumstance where the cyclist would otherwise be ticketed. (Note: Cycling while impaired significantly increases the risk of injury and fatal accidents. One source gives a 20× (2000%) increased risk from cycling impaired. Since cycling involves learned reactions, the cyclist should consider strategies for remaining clear of traffic.)

=== Physician reporting ===
Six states require physicians to report patients who drive while impaired. Another 25 states permit physicians to violate doctor-patient confidentiality to report impaired drivers, if they so choose. The American Medical Association endorsed physician reporting in 1999, but deferred to the states on whether such notification should be mandatory or permissive. Medical bioethicist Jacob Appel of New York University says physician reporting may deter some patients from seeking care, writing "Reporting may remove some dangerous drivers from the roads, but if in doing so it actually creates other dangerous drivers, by scaring them away from treatment, then society has sacrificed confidentiality for no tangible return in lives saved."

=== Federal regulation ===
The United States Federal Railroad Administration and Federal Aviation Administration, both of which are part of the USDOT, respectively impose a 0.04% BAC limit for train crew and aircrew.

=== Private employers ===
Some U.S. employers impose their own rules for drug and alcohol use by employees who operate motor vehicles. For example, the Union Pacific Railroad imposes a BAC limit of 0.02%, that if, after an on-duty traffic crash, the determination that an employee violated that rule may result in termination of employment with no chance of future rehire.

== Penalties ==
The consequences of an impaired driving charge include both criminal and administrative penalties. Criminal penalties are imposed as a result of criminal prosecution. Administrative penalties are imposed by a state agency, and in some cases may apply even if a person stopped for impaired driving is not convicted of the offense.

=== Criminal penalties ===
The penalties for drunk driving vary among states and jurisdictions. It is not uncommon for the penalties to be different from county to county within any given state depending on the practices of the individual jurisdiction. Some jurisdictions require jail time and larger fines, even on a first offense. For instance, Ohio requires a mandatory 72-hour jail sentence for a first offense conviction; however, the jail time component is satisfied by attendance of the Ohio A.W.A.R.E. Program, which is a 72-hour alcohol-education program. Compared to many other countries, such as Sweden, penalties for drunk driving in the United States are considered less severe unless alcohol is involved in an incident causing injury or death of another, such as DUI, DWI or OWI with Great Bodily Injury (GBI) or Vehicular Manslaughter.

==== Diversion programs ====
The State of Washington used to permit those charged with a first offense drunk driving to complete a diversion program that resulted in the charges being dismissed upon the completion of a Diversion Program. In 1975, under the revised code of Washington or RCW Section 10.05, the Washington State Legislature established a deferred prosecution option for offenders arrested for driving under the influence of alcohol or impairing drugs (DUI). It was intended to encourage individuals to seek appropriate treatment and, under this option, defendants with a significant alcohol or drug dependence problem could petition a court to defer disposition of their charge until they have completed intensive substance dependence treatment and met other conditions required by the court. If the defendant successfully completed the terms of the program, the charge was dismissed; for those who failed, the deferred status was revoked and the defendant was prosecuted for the original DUI charge. (RCW 10.05.010 and 10.05.020) In 1992, the University of Washington Alcohol and Drug Abuse Institute evaluated DUI deferred prosecution and concluded the program reduced DUI recidivism. In 1998, the legislature modified the DUI statutes. Among other things, the length of deferred prosecution supervision was increased from two to five years and defendants were restricted to one deferred prosecution per lifetime.

==== Driving While Impaired court ====
These innovative courts use substance abuse intervention with repeat offenders who plead guilty to driving while intoxicated. Those accepted into the diversionary program are required to abstain from alcohol. Some are required to wear a device that monitors and records any levels of alcohol detected in their bloodstreams.

=== Administrative penalties ===
The federal Assimilative Crimes Act, which makes state law applicable on lands reserved or acquired by the Federal government when the act or omission is not made punishable by an enactment of Congress, recognizes collateral actions related to DUI convictions as punishments. According to 18 U.S.C. § 13:

… that which may or shall be imposed through judicial or administrative action under the law of a State, territory, possession, or district, for a conviction for operating a motor vehicle under the influence of a drug or alcohol, shall be considered to be a punishment provided by that law …

==== SR-22 - Proof of Financial Responsibility ====
An SR-22 is an addendum to an insurance policy. It is an administrative form that attests to an insurance company's coverage, or the posting of a personal public bond in the amount of the state's minimum liability coverage for the licensed driver or vehicle registration. The SR in SR-22 stands for Safety Responsibility, and it is needed to reinstate a suspended driver's license after a DUI conviction in 49 states and the District of Columbia. It is submitted to the State's DMV by an auto insurance company to serve as proof that a driver has the minimum liability insurance that the states requires. They are essentially an agreement between a driver's insurance company and the respective State's DMV that requires the driver's insurance company to notify the respective State's DMV that the driver's insurance has either been terminated or lapsed; thus instituting a suspension of the driver's driving privileges until proof of insurance is re-filed with the State's DMV.

While SR-22s are typically filed with the respective State's DMV, some States require the driver to carry proof of the SR-22 or to carry it in the registered vehicle, (particularly if the driver has been cited for coverage lapses or other administrative infractions). SR-22s may attest coverage for a vehicle regardless of operator (owner liability coverage), or cover a specific person regardless of the specific vehicle operated (operator liability coverage).

As stated, the form is required in 49 states and the US District of Columbia in order to register a vehicle for usage on public roads. It is also required to redeem a license which has been suspended due to coverage lapse in these required states. These states also, generally, require that the issuing insurance company provide the relevant state's DMV with timely updates as to the status of such coverage. If the policy with the SR22 cancels, a form called an SR26 is issued and sent to the state DMV. Upon notice that there has been a lapse in coverage, the state will suspend the driver's license again. Another SR-22 filing will need to be submitted to regain driving privileges.

==== Alcohol education programs ====
Every jurisdiction imposes the completion of alcohol education programs, commonly known as DUI programs, subsequent to a DUI/DWI/OWI conviction. Additionally, some states impose an additional requirement that a person attend a Victim Impact Panel (VIP) administered by Mothers Against Drunk Driving (MADD), which was established in 1982. Both DUI classes and Victim Impact Panels are available in some states for first offense DUIs dependent on the judge's decision.

==== DUI plates ====
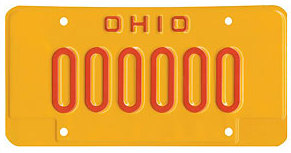
Ohio DUI plate

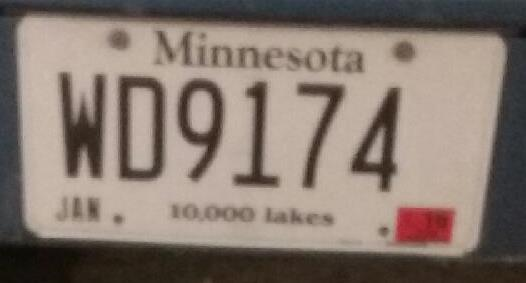
Minnesota drunk driver plate

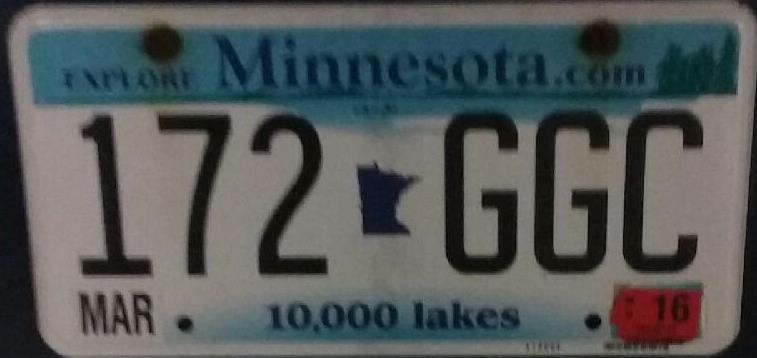
By comparison, a regular Minnesota plate has colored graphics.

In 1967, Ohio began to issue special license plates to DUI offenders who are granted limited driving privileges such as work-related driving until a court can rule that they can have full privileges back. In 2004, the plates became mandated by state law to all DUI offenders. Unlike Ohio's standard-issue plates (which, as of 2021, have a sun rising over the countryside and a plane graphic), the DUI plates are yellow with red writing with no registration stickers or graphics. They are commonly referred to as "party plates".

Minnesota has a similar program, where the plates are white with either blue or black text. The plate number is a "W", followed by a letter and four numbers. These plates may be issued to drivers with at least two offenses in a five-year period; three offenses in a ten-year period; having a BAC twice the legal limit; or having a child in the car at the time of arrest. In Minnesota, DUI plates are referred to as "whiskey plates", whiskey being the name of the letter W in the NATO phonetic alphabet.

==== Alcohol restrictions ====
In 2026, Utah adopted a state law allowing those convicted of "extreme" DUI (BAC of 0.16 or higher, or use of alcohol with other substances) to be declared "interdicted" for a period of time. Interdicted persons are prohibited from purchasing alcohol, and are issued a state identification card containing a red stripe reading "NO ALCOHOL SALE". Establishments are prohibited from furnishing alcohol sales to interdicted persons; as an enforcement mechanism, the state concurrently enacted rules requiring that valid photo ID be presented by all patrons who purchase alcohol with no exception, with establishments specifically required to visually inspect the ID for the red stripe..

==== Ignition interlock devices ====
Most states impose the installation of ignition interlock devices (IID), with varying thresholds for installation requirements. Criminal process thresholds for installation requirements vary between minimum BAC levels (e.g., 0.20%, or 0.15%) or repeat offense, with about half of the states requiring installation on first offense.

These ignition interlock sanctions are meant as punishment, but also as a deterrence. When required under a high BAC level or multiple offense threshold, ignition interlock requirements address a strong tendency of repeat offense by drivers with alcoholic use disorder (AUD or alcoholism).

Ignition interlock requirements are also imposed in some instances after positive chemical blood alcohol tests, as a physical deterrent for drivers with alcoholic use disorder, or as a pseudo-civil punishment. Ignition interlock requirements are also imposed in some instances after an implied consent refusal under similar forensic procedures.

===== Operation of IIDs =====
In most US implementations, IIDs are set to a "zero tolerance" level (set to either levels consistent with culinary alcohol or measurement errors). Violations can occur from a driver exceeding the "zero tolerance" level, but can also occur from use by other drivers within legal limits, or from test anomalies. In some states, anomalies are routinely discounted, for example as not consistent with patterns of BAC levels or at levels incompatible with life (e.g., significant mouth alcohol - which as BAC would be fatal). In some states, "fail" readings not consistent with actual alcohol use can be cleared by a routine process, but other states automatically deem these "fail" readings as violations.

In operation, the driver blows into the IIDs to enable the car's starter. After a variable time period of approximately 20–40 minutes, the driver is required to re-certify (blow again) within a time period consistent with safely pulling off the roadway. If the driver fails to re-certify within the time period, the car will alarm in a manner similar to setting off the car's immobilizer (but mechanically independent of the immobilizer).

Various US states have different penalties for disabling IIDs. In some cases, the driver may be penalized if a family member or mechanic disables the IID when not in use by the sanctioned individual, or temporarily for servicing the vehicle. In some implementations, disabling by mechanics and others is either permitted or authorisation easily obtained, but some jurisdictions restrict or deny authorisation. (Such restrictions on mechanics can be problematic, for example, if limited to designated "licensed mechanics" or as applied to routine repair procedures requiring operation of the ignition and starter systems.) Some jurisdictions criminalize such temporary bypass of IIDs.

===== Universal IID installation =====
Proposals (none official) have been made to install IIDs on all new vehicles, set to the legal limit for the driver. Issues to be solved, besides consumer and voter acceptance, include difficulty in obtaining accurate measurements without inconvenience, and a need to achieve Six Sigma (6σ) reliability, in order to not interfere with vehicle usability.

There are no present plans to introduce universal IID installation in the US.

==== Vehicle impoundment and forfeiture ====
Some states, such as California, allow for the impoundment and forfeiture of vehicles under certain conditions.

== Investigation and arrest stages ==
A drunk driving charge is a type of police arrest process, so a basic understanding of the process of police engagement is essential to understanding how that process applies to that process as applied to a drunk driving charge.

=== Legal stages ===
Following are common procedures when a law enforcement officer has reason to suspect a driver is intoxicated. While local procedures vary under the tens of thousands of courts in the US having traffic jurisdiction, the basic procedure is:

1. reasonable suspicion
2. probable cause
3. arrest (including invoking the implied consent law)
4. criminal charge and "civil law" sanctions

The legal stages are relevant because of the degree of evidence required at each stage. For example, the police need not demonstrate guilt "beyond a reasonable doubt" in order to execute a traffic stop.

=== Investigation "Phases" (NHTSA) ===
The investigation and NHTSA "phases" are distinct from the legal stages of the police arrest process. Instead, the investigation has, as its purpose, to take the process from initial contact through all of the evidence stages, through to prosecution. The primary goals are to:

- Identify impaired drivers;
- Establish clear probable cause for arrest, which is necessary to sustain the use of chemical test results in court. Without probable cause, the chemical test results are subject to the exclusionary rule
- Proceed to obtain proof of intoxication, typically using chemical test results.

According to the National Highway Traffic Safety Administration, police officers should conduct DUI Investigations according to a specific protocol called phases. According to the NHTSA training, DUI Investigations are categorized by these phases:

- Phase 1 - "Vehicle in Motion"
- Phase 2 - "Personal Contact"
- Phase 3 - "Pre-Arrest Screening"

The "Vehicle in Motion" Phase deals with the law enforcement officers' observations of the suspect's driving maneuvers. The "Personal Contact" Phase is where the officer actually comes into contact with the suspected impaired driver. The "Pre-Arrest Screening" Phase is portion of the DUI Investigation that encompasses the Pre-Field Sobriety Test Questioning and the Field Sobriety Testing, including a Preliminary Alcohol Screening Test where applicable. This Phase also includes the post-arrest evidentiary chemical test despite that it occurs subsequent to a DUI arrest, not prior to a DUI arrest.

If the officer observes enough to have a reasonable suspicion to legally justify a further detention and investigation, they will ask the driver to step out of the vehicle, and request that the driver submit to voluntary field sobriety tests.

== Overall stop and arrest process ==
Note: Local terminology will vary, but these general classifications fall under US Supreme Court guidelines.

Each stage has different requirements for establishing a basis for police or prosecutorial action. Without establishing that basis, the process is illegal and can cause a prosecution to fail under the exclusionary rule.

=== 1. Reasonable suspicion and traffic stop ===
There are several situations in which the officer will come into contact with a driver, some examples are:

- The officer on patrol has observed erratic, suspicious driving, or a series of traffic infractions indicating the possibility that the driver may be impaired. This is by far the most common reason for stopping a suspect.
- A police officer has stopped a vehicle for a lesser traffic offense, notices the signs of intoxication, and begins the DUI investigation.
- The driver has been involved in an automobile collision; the officer has responded to the scene and is conducting an investigation.
- The driver has been stopped at a sobriety checkpoint (also known as roadblocks).
- The police have received a report, possibly from an anonymous citizen, that a described car has been driving erratically. The officer should verify the erratic driving before pulling the driver over. In some cases, the driver will no longer be in the vehicle.

The police must have a reason to engage in a traffic stop. This typically involves either observing a traffic violation or observing behavior, such as weaving or lane departure, that would raise a "reasonable suspicion" of driving while impaired. The police must have an articulable reason for the stop, but does not need probable cause for an arrest. One exception is a roadblock (where legal). Roadblocks do not involve reasonable suspicion, but must meet particular legal standards to avoid arbitrariness while still assuring randomness. The following list of DUI symptoms, from a publication issued by the National Highway Traffic Safety Administration (DOT HS-805-711), is widely used in training officers to detect drunk drivers. After each symptom is a percentage figure which, according to NHTSA, indicates the statistical chances through research that a driver is over the legal limit.

Turning with wide radius	over 50%
Straddling center or lane marker	65%
Appearing to be drunk	60%
Almost striking object or vehicle	60%
Weaving	60%
Driving on other than designated roadway	55%
Swerving	55%
Slow speed (more than 10 mph below limit)	50%
Stopping (without cause) in traffic lane	50%
Drifting	50%
Following too closely	45%
Tires on center or lane marker	45%
Braking erratically	45%
Driving into opposing or crossing traffic	45%
Signaling inconsistent with driving actions	40%
Stopping inappropriately (other than in lane)	35%
Turning abruptly or illegally	35%
Accelerating or decelerating rapidly	30%
Headlights off	30%

During the traffic stop, the police will attempt to obtain sufficient evidence to support "probable cause". This includes asking questions, and requesting further evidence or confession. The officer will typically approach the driver's window and ask some preliminary questions. During this phase of the stop, the officer will note if they detect any of the following indicators of intoxication:

- Odor of an alcoholic beverage on the driver's breath or in the car generally
- Slurred speech in response to the questioning
- Watery, blood shot, or reddish eyes
- Flushed face
- Droopy eyelids
- Difficulty in understanding and responding intelligently to question
- Fumbling with his or her driver's license and registration
- The plain-view presence of containers of alcoholic beverages in the vehicle
- Admission of consumption of alcoholic beverage

If the officer observes enough evidence to have a "Reasonable Suspicion" to legally justify a further detention and investigation, they will ask the driver to step out of the vehicle.

=== 2. Probable cause ===
"Probable cause" is established by obtaining evidence from the police encounter sufficient to meet the "probable cause" standard for arrest. "Probable cause" is not necessarily sufficient to obtain a conviction, but is a prerequisite for arrest. Specifically, in US law, an officer must have probable cause for arrest in order to invoke the implied consent requirements. In order to sustain a conviction based on evidential tests, probable cause must be shown (or the suspect must volunteer to take the evidential test without implied consent requirements being invoked). Police are not obliged to advise the suspect that participation in a FST or other pre-arrest procedures is voluntary. In contrast, formal evidentiary tests given under implied consent requirements are considered mandatory.

Examples of "probable cause" for a drunk driving arrest includes:

1. Observation

The NHTSA outlines several indicators of impairment, commonly referred to as “impairment cues.” These cues encompass behaviors like tightly gripping the steering wheel, driving with a closely positioned face to the windshield, slouching in the seat, and maintaining a fixed stare straight ahead. Certain officers regularly observe the facial expressions of drivers in opposing traffic, seeking signs of impairment.

2. Confession of having consumed alcohol in the recent past. Relevant examples of confessions:

- "I had a glass of wine."
- "I was at a friend's party."
- "I was at the Stone Balloon."
The confession is the easiest way to establish "probable cause", and police know that social convention encourages people to respond to police questions. While it is inadvisable to lie to police, the suspect has the option to "respectfully decline" to answer questions.
The suspect is typically not given Miranda warnings at this time because the encounter legally has not gone from "investigatory" to "accusatory", and because the police want the suspect to believe the questions are not being made to gather "probable cause" evidence. At this point, the suspect is not required to provide more than identification and vehicle information.

3. Documented test results, such as

- Preliminary breath test (PBT) evidence
- Test results from field sobriety tests

==== Field sobriety tests ====
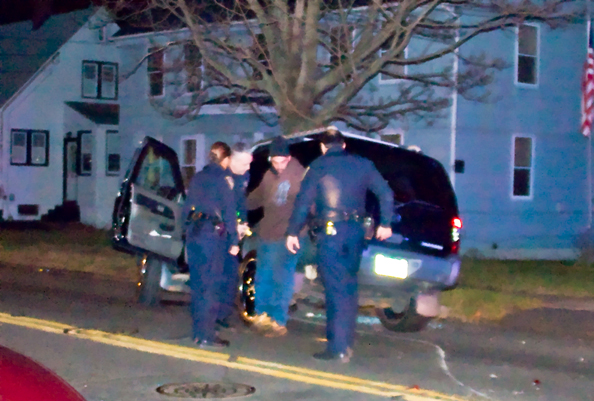
Police administer a one-leg-stand test after a crash, 2008

One of the most controversial aspects of a DUI stop is the field sobriety test (FSTs). The National Highway Traffic Safety Administration (NHTSA) has developed a model system for managing Standardized Field Sobriety Test (SFST) training and published numerous training manuals associated with FSTs. FSTs and SFSTs are promoted as determining "whether a subject is impaired", but FST tests are widely regarded having, as their primary purpose, establishing tangible evidence of "probable cause for arrest". Probable cause is necessary under US law (4th Amendment) to sustain an arrest and (significantly) to invoke the implied consent law. A secondary purpose is to provide supporting corroborative tangible evidence for use against the suspect for use at trial in jurisdictions that permit such evidence. In all US jurisdictions, participation in a Field Sobriety Test (FST) is voluntary, and not required under implied consent laws. Police are not obliged to advise the suspect that participation in a FST or other pre-arrest procedures is voluntary. In contrast, formal evidentiary tests given under implied consent requirements are considered mandatory.

==== Preliminary Breath Test (PBT) or Preliminary Alcohol Screening test (PAS) ====
An increasingly used test during the traffic stop involves having the suspect breathe into a small, handheld breath testing device. The Preliminary Breath Test (PBT) or Preliminary Alcohol Screening test (PAS) is sometimes categorised as part of field sobriety testing, although it is not part of the series of performance tests. These "Preliminary Alcohol Screening" (PAS) or "Portable Evidentiary Breath Test" (PEBT) devices typically use a relatively simple and inexpensive electrochemical fuel cell technology, rather than the infrared spectroscopy used in the Evidentiary Breath Test (EBT) instruments at police stations, but with calibration may have similar accuracy. While the tester provides numerical blood alcohol content (BAC) readings, its primary purpose is to show probable cause for arrest. The PAS test precedes the actual arrest and is not considered evidentiary; if the suspect is arrested, they will subsequently be required to submit to an evidentiary chemical test of the suspect's breath or blood.

Refusal to take a preliminary breath test (PBT) in Michigan subjects a non-commercial driver to a "civil infraction" penalty, with no violation "points", but is not considered to be a refusal under the general "implied consent" law. In some states, the state may present evidence of refusal to take a field sobriety test in court, although this is of questionable probative value in a drunk driving prosecution.

Different requirements apply in many states to drivers under DUI probation, in which case participation in a preliminary breath test (PBT) may be a condition of probation, and for commercial drivers under "drug screening" requirements. Some US states, notably California, have statutes on the books penalizing PBT refusal for drivers under 21; however the Constitutionality of those statutes has not been tested. (As a practical matter, most criminal lawyers advise not engaging in discussion or "justifying" a refusal with the police.)

=== 3. Arrest (including invoking the implied consent law) ===
==== Probable cause for arrest ====
If the officer has sufficient probable cause that the suspect has been driving under the influence of alcohol, they will make the arrest, handcuff the suspect and transport them to the police station. En route, the officer may advise them of their legal implied consent obligation to submit to an evidentiary chemical test of blood, breath or possibly urine depending on the jurisdiction.

Laws relating to what exactly constitutes probable cause vary from state to state. In California it is a refutable presumption that a person with a BAC of 0.08% or higher is driving under the influence. However, section 23610(a)(2) of the California Vehicle Code states that driving with a BAC between 0.05% and 0.08% "shall not give rise to any presumption that the person was or was not under the influence of an alcoholic beverage".

==== Chemical test ====
An arrestee will be offered a chemical test of breath, blood or, much less frequently, urine. Breath test results are usually available immediately; urine and blood samples are sent to a lab for later analysis to determine the BAC or possible presence of drugs. Some states sought to impose criminal punishment for a refusal to submit to a chemical test of their breath or blood; however, in Birchfield v. North Dakota, the United States Supreme Court visited the issue of whether states can criminalize a refusal to submit to a chemical test. The United States Supreme Court decided that states may criminalize a refusal to submit to a breath test; but not a refusal to submit to a blood test absent a McNeely warrant, named after Missouri v. McNeely (2013). This was a case decided by United States Supreme Court, on appeal from the Supreme Court of Missouri, regarding exceptions to the Fourth Amendment to the United States Constitution under exigent circumstances. The United States Supreme Court ruled that police must generally obtain a warrant before subjecting a drunken-driving suspect to a blood test, and that the natural metabolism of blood alcohol does not establish a per se exigency that would justify a blood draw without consent.

Regarding blood tests, some commentators, such as Brown University's Jacob Appel, have criticized the role of medical personnel in this process. According to Appel, "If physicians acquiesce today in the removal of a resistant patient's blood, soon they may be called upon to pump the contents of an unwilling patient's stomach or even to perform involuntary surgery to retrieve an evidentiary bullet."

While chemical tests are used to determine the driver's BAC, they do not determine the driver's level of impairment. However, state laws usually provide for a rebuttable legal presumption of intoxication at a BAC of 0.08% or higher (see blood alcohol test assumptions).

=== 4. Criminal charge, and "civil law" sanctions ===
==== Booking and charging ====
If it is determined after arrest that the person's BAC is not at or above the legal limit of 0.08%, they will probably be released without any charges. One may, however, still be charged with driving under the influence of alcohol on the basis of driving symptoms, observed impairment, admissions or performance on the field sobriety tests. And if there is suspicion of drug usage, a blood or urine test is likely, or at least the testimony of a specially trained officer called a Drug Recognition Expert (DRE). Assuming sufficient evidence of impaired driving from drugs, the arrested may face charges of driving under the influence of drugs or the combined influence of alcohol and drugs.

Most of the time, the driver will either be kept in a holding cell (sometimes referred to as the "drunk tank") until they are deemed sober enough to be released on bail or on his "own recognizance" (OR). A date to appear in court for an arraignment will be given to them. If they cannot make bail or is not granted OR, they will be kept in jail to wait for the arraignment on remand.

== Cost of an impaired driving charge ==
In the United States, paying the DUI ticket, court costs, and attorney fees is just the start of a person's financial obligations after a DUI conviction. Additional costs of a DUI conviction will often involve the installation and maintenance fees of a vehicle Ignition Interlock Device, which serves the same function as a Breathalyzer to enable the vehicle to start. A person convicted of a driving under the influence charge, can also expect to pay higher insurance rates and premiums. In addition, DUI records prevent entry into Canada without proper documentation.

== Prevention ==
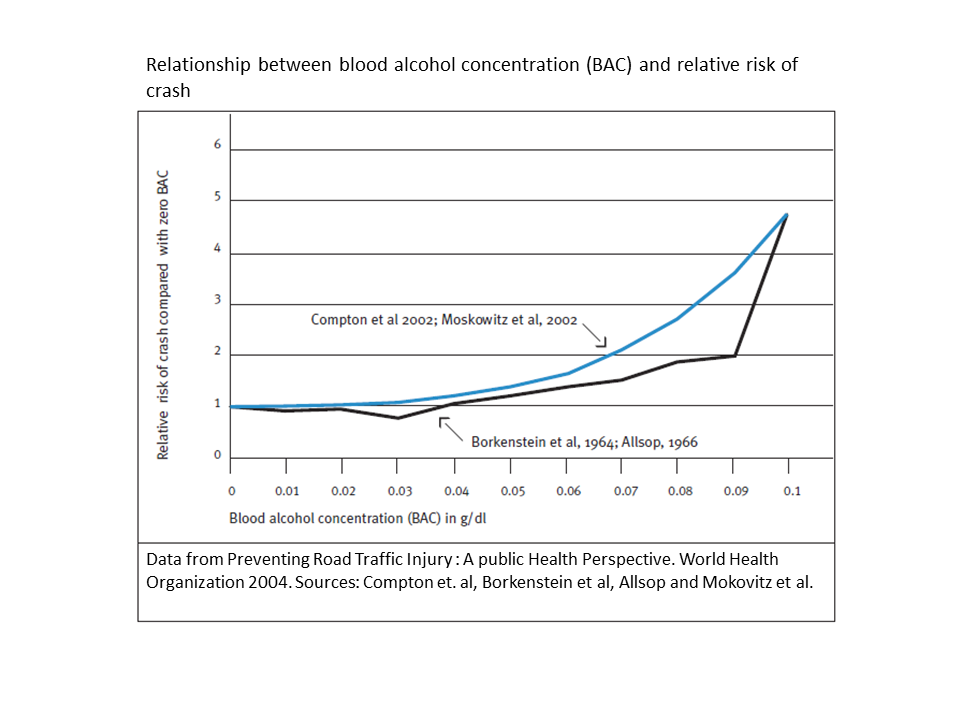
Relative risk of a collision based on blood alcohol levels

Drunk driving is a public health concern in the United States, and reducing its frequency may require an integrated community-based approach utilizing sanctions and treatments. Several intervention programs have been developed, such as the Paradigm Developmental Model of Treatment (PDMT), a program encouraging a paradigm shift in the offender's view of oneself and the world.

The National Institute for Alcohol Abuse and Alcoholism suggests environmental interventions to help eliminate drinking and driving all together.

== Flying and boating under the influence ==
Federal Aviation Regulation 91.17 (14 CFR 91.17) prohibits pilots from flying aircraft with an alcohol level of 0.04% or more, or within eight hours of consuming alcohol ("eight hours, bottle to throttle"), or while under the impairing influence of any drug. The same prohibition applies to any other crew members on duty aboard the aircraft (flight attendants, etc.). Some airlines impose additional restrictions, and many pilots also impose stricter standards upon themselves. Commercial pilots found to be in violation of regulations are typically fired or resign voluntarily, and they may lose their pilot certificates and be subject to criminal prosecution under Federal or State laws, effectively ending their careers.

Similar laws apply to other activities involving transportation; Michigan prohibits intoxicated use of motorized farm implements, or boating, the latter whether a pilot or passenger, with much the same threshold of intoxication. In the case of boating, the laws extend to include kayaks, canoes, sailboats—any flotation device that needs to be steered in water. Different states have different laws and classifications on the level of transgression attached to a citation for boating under the influence. For example, Virginia has very similar penalties for a BUI as it does for a DUI. Those convicted of boating while intoxicated face penalties including, fines of up to $2,500, jail time of up to one year, loss of one's operator's license for up to three years and mandatory enrollment and completion of a Virginia Alcohol Safety Action Program.

Alcohol use was the number one contributing factor in U.S. recreational boating deaths between 2003 and 2012, accounting for 15 percent of the fatalities in 2003, and 17 percent in 2012. A Canadian study published in 2011 examined 18 years of data on recreational boating, and concluded that a "true figure" of alcohol-related deaths in that country "may lie between 46% and 56%".

== International comparisons ==
In countries such as the United Kingdom and Australia drunk driving and deaths caused by drunk driving are considerably lower than in the United States. Drunk driving deaths in the UK (population 61 million, 31 million cars) were 380 in 2010 (21% of all fatal crashes). In California (population 36 million, 32 million cars) there were 950 deaths from traffic crashes involving drivers with a Blood Alcohol Content (BAC) of 0.08 or greater in 2009 (31% of all fatal collisions). Alcohol consumption per capita in the UK and Australia is higher than in the United States and the legal age for drinking lower.

Research in the United Kingdom has shown that the danger group for drunk driving is young men in their early 20s rather than teenagers. It is not uncommon for police forces in Australia to randomly stop motorists, typically at a checkpoint, and submit them to a random breath test. This test involves speaking or blowing into a hand-held breathalyzer to give a reading; if this is over the legal limit, the driver will be arrested, and required to perform a test on another breathalyzer, which can be used for a conviction. Refusing a roadside or evidential test is an offense, and is subject to the same penalty as high-range drunk driving. This detection method is not employed in the UK, and it is not an offence in England, Wales or Australia for a fully licensed driver to drive with a BAC of less than 0.08% (Australia and Scotland have limits of 0.05%), however, in Australia this detection, even if under the legal limit, may still result in a penalty if there is an open container of alcohol in the vehicle. In Australia, it is an offence for any learner or probationary driver to drive with a BAC above 0.00%. In addition, anyone instructing or supervising a learner driver must have a BAC of under 0.05%.

Unlike the United States, these countries do not see restricting access to alcohol as having any useful role to play in reducing drunk driving. Their experience is that random breath tests, severe penalties, including potential imprisonment for a first offense (in the UK) -- combined with blanket public service broadcasting—are a more effective strategy.

Also, Australian and British laws do not recognize the crime of DUI manslaughter, and sentences for causing death by drunk driving are much lower than the United States. In the UK, a judge makes a sentencing decision based on the amount of alcohol present. This can lead to imprisonment for a first offence.

In Germany, the legal limit of 0.05% lowers to 0.03% if a driver is found to be at fault in a traffic crash. A BAC of 0.00% is the standard for those who are under 21 years of age.

== See also ==
- America West Airlines Flight 556: pilots arrested in 2002 for attempting to fly while drunk
- Carrollton bus disaster, about a 1988 bus collision in Kentucky caused by a drunk driver that resulted in 27 deaths
- DUI laws in California
- Every 15 Minutes

== General and cited sources ==
- Rubenzer, S. (January/February 2011). "Judging intoxication", Behavioral Sciences & The Law vol. 29, no. 1: 116–137. doi:10.1002/bsl.935.
