= SR-22 (insurance) =

Vehicle liability insurance document in the United States

In the United States, an SR-22 (sometimes referred to as a certificate of insurance (Note: The term "certificate of insurance" has other meanings outside of vehicle insurance. Some states may use different forms in place of, or in addition to, the SR-22 to provide certificates of vehicle liability insurance or proof of financial responsibility.) or a financial responsibility filing) is a vehicle liability insurance document required by most state departments of motor vehicles (DMV) offices (Note: As of 2011, the only states that did not use SR-22 forms were Delaware, Kentucky, Minnesota, New Mexico, New York, North Carolina, Oklahoma and Pennsylvania.) for "high-risk" insurance policies. An SR-22 is not an insurance policy, but a filing, or an add-on, that is added to a personal automobile liability insurance policy. Not all insurance carriers offer SR-22 filings in all territories. For instance, an insurer may offer traditional base coverage in a particular state but not issue an SR-22 in that state.

A DMV may require an SR-22 from a driver to reinstate their driving privileges following an uninsured car accident or conviction of another traffic-related offense, such as a DUI. An SR-22 may be required for three years for conviction of driving without insurance or driving with a suspended license and up to five years for a DUI. If an SR-22 should expire or be canceled, the insurance company is required to issue an SR-26 form, which certifies the cancellation of the policy.

Some states accept an SR-22 as an alternative to a deposit in cash or security as proof of financial responsibility. In Arizona, for instance, a driver seeking reinstatement under specific circumstances may submit an SR-22 in lieu of depositing $40,000 in cash or certificates of deposit. In Washington state, a driver may submit an SR-22 instead of a liability bond of at least $60,000 from a surety or bonding company that is licensed to operate in Washington.

== See also ==
- Automobile safety
- Drunk driving in the United States
- National Traffic and Motor Vehicle Safety Act
- Uniform Vehicle Code
