= Cannabis and impaired driving =

Two main questions arise in the law surrounding driving after having ingested cannabis: (1) whether cannabis actually impairs driving ability, and (2) whether the common practice of testing for THC (the main psychoactive substance in cannabis) is a reliable means to measure impairment. On the first question, studies are mixed. Several recent, extensive studies–including one conducted by the National Highway Traffic Safety Administration and one conducted by the American Automobile Association (AAA)–show that drivers with detectable THC in their blood are no more likely to cause car crashes than drivers with no amount of THC in their blood. Others show that cannabis can impair certain abilities important to safe driving (such as reaction time, divided attention, and cognitive functions)–but no studies have been able to show that this increases the actual risk of crashing, or that drivers with THC in their blood cause a disproportionate number of crashes. On the second question, the studies that have been conducted so far have consistently found that THC blood levels and degree of impairment are not closely related. No known relationship between blood levels of THC (the main psychoactive substance in cannabis) and increased relative crash risk, or THC blood levels and level of driving impairment, has been shown by single-crash or classic-control studies. Thus, even though it is possible that cannabis impairs driving ability to some extent, there are currently no reliable means to test or measure whether a driver was actually impaired.

Nonetheless, policymakers in the United States have generally dealt with cannabis-and-driving criminalization by importing the alcohol DUI regime into the cannabis context. This has led to complications down the road when cannabis-driving cases land in criminal court because cannabis detection science differs vastly from alcohol detection science. For example, blood alcohol content (BAC) has similar rates of absorption, distribution, and elimination across all humans, and there is also a fairly good correlation between BAC and level of impairment (in other words, impairment increases when BAC increases, and impairment decreases when BAC decreases). This has allowed law enforcement to use tools like breathalyzers and blood tests in criminal court because alcohol concentration is a relatively reliable indicator of how recently and how much alcohol was consumed. In contrast, THC levels can vary widely depending on the means of ingestion, THC is metabolized at an exponentially declining rate (as opposed to the steady metabolization rate for alcohol), and there is very poor correlation of THC blood levels with impairment. As stated in a report to Congress produced by the U.S. Department of Transportation's National Highway Traffic Safety Administration, "[I]n contrast to the situation with alcohol, someone can show little or no impairment at a THC level at which someone else may show a greater degree of impairment." The report also noted that, in some studies, THC was detectable as late as 30 days after ingestion–even though the acute psychoactive effects of cannabis last only for a few hours.

== Effects on driving ==
Studies that are more carefully controlled, and that actually measure marijuana (THC) use by drivers rather than relying on self-report, generally show reduced crash risk estimates or no risk associated with marijuana use.

In the largest and most precisely controlled study of its kind carried out by the U.S. Department of Transportation's National Highway Traffic Safety Administration to research the risks of cannabis and driving, it was found that other "studies that measure the presence of THC in the drivers' blood or oral fluid, rather than relying on self-report tend to have much lower (or no) elevated crash risk estimates. Likewise better controlled studies have found lower (or no) elevated crash risk estimates". The study found that "after adjusting for age, gender, race and alcohol use, drivers who tested positive for marijuana were no more likely to crash than those who had not used any drugs or alcohol prior to driving". The study however cautions that "these results do not indicate that drug use by drivers is risk-free." A 2012 British Medical Journal meta-analysis indicated that "drivers who consume cannabis within three hours of driving are nearly twice as likely to cause a vehicle collision as those who are not under the influence of drugs or alcohol" and found that acute cannabis use increased the risk of an automobile crash.

In Cannabis and driving: a review of the literature and commentary, the United Kingdom's Department for Transport summarized available research on cannabis and driving. It concluded that there is no evidence that impairment resulting from cannabis use causes accidents, and that it is problematic to estimate the percentage of accident involvements associated with cannabis use alone given the lack of valid baseline data and that the presence of cannabis is often confounded by alcohol. The report summarizes current knowledge about the effects of cannabis on driving and accident risk based on a review of available literature published since 1994 and the effects of cannabis on laboratory based tasks. The study identified young males, amongst whom cannabis consumption is frequent and increasing, and in whom alcohol consumption is also common, as a risk group for traffic accidents. The cause, according to the report, is driving inexperience and factors associated with youth relating to risk taking, delinquency and motivation. These demographic and psychosocial variables may relate to both drug use and accident risk, thereby presenting an artificial relationship between use of drugs and accident involvement.

Kelly, Darke and Ross show similar results, with laboratory studies examining the effects of cannabis on skills utilised while driving showing impairments in tracking, attention, reaction time, short-term memory, hand-eye coordination, vigilance, time and distance perception, and decision making and concentration. An EMCDDA review concluded that "the acute effect of moderate or higher doses of cannabis impairs the skills related to safe driving and injury risk", specifically "attention, tracking and psychomotor skills". In their review of driving simulator studies, Kelly et al. conclude that there is evidence of dose-dependent impairments in cannabis-affected drivers' ability to control a vehicle in the areas of steering, headway control, speed variability, car following, reaction time and lane positioning. The researchers note that "even in those who learn to compensate for a drug's impairing effects, substantial impairment in performance can still be observed under conditions of general task performance (i.e. when no contingencies are present to maintain compensated performance)."

An extensive 2013 review of 66 studies regarding crash risk and drug use found that cannabis was associated with minor, but not statistically significant increased odds of injury or fatal accident. The estimated fatal crash odds for cannabis (1.26) were lower than: opiates (1.68), antianxiety medications (2.30), zopiclone (sleep medicine) (2.60), cocaine (2.96), and amphetamines (5.17). The estimated injury odds for cannabis (1.10) were lower than: antihistamines (1.12), penicillin (1.12), antianxiety meds (1.17), antidepressants (1.35), antiasthmatics (1.31), zopiclone (sleep medicine) (1.42), cocaine (1.66), and opiates (1.91). The study concluded: "By and large, the increase in the risk of accident involvement associated with the use of drugs must be regarded as modest...Compared to the huge increase in accident risk associated with alcohol, as well as the high accident rate among young drivers, the increases in risk associated with the use of drugs are surprisingly small."

A report from the University of Colorado, Montana State University, and the University of Oregon found that on average, states that have legalized medical cannabis had a decrease in traffic-related fatalities by 8–11%. The researchers hypothesized "it's just safer to drive under the influence of marijuana than it is drunk....Drunk drivers take more risk, they tend to go faster. They don't realize how impaired they are. People who are under the influence of marijuana drive slower, they don't take as many risks". Another consideration, they added, was the fact that users of marijuana tend not to go out as much.

On the other hand, a recent study of Journal of Transport & Health indicated that the numbers of fatal crashes involving marijuana after the recreational marijuana legalization or decriminalization have significantly increased in Colorado, Washington, and Massachusetts.

== Detection of impairment ==
The former director of the U.S. Office of National Drug Control Policy Gil Kerlikowske said in 2012, "I'll be dead from old age, before we know the impairment levels" for cannabis. A 2017 Canadian government report stated "science is unable to provide general guidance to drivers about how much cannabis can be consumed before it is unsafe to drive".

Some users seem to be able to perform risk compensation by driving slower or other behaviors, and some users appear to develop a physiological tolerance, making determining a standard impairment dose difficult. A 2010 study found "cannabis and alcohol acutely impair several driving-related skills in a dose-related fashion, but the effects of cannabis vary more between individuals because of tolerance, differences in smoking technique, and different absorptions of THC". A 2014 study found "no correlation between degree of impairment and THCA-A blood concentration". Because of these findings, some safety organizations have advocated that police use behavioral impairment tests instead of metabolite testing.

=== False indications of driving impairment ===
Testing for metabolites of THC, versus the actual THC intoxicant, can result in DUID convictions of users who aren't actually impaired. According to National Institute on Drug Abuse, "the role played by marijuana in crashes is often unclear because it can be detected in body fluids for days or even weeks after intoxication".

=== False positives ===
According to a 2017 Report to Congress produced by the U.S. National Highway Traffic Safety Administration, many of the THC immunoassay screening tests used by law enforcement can give a false positive of THC metabolites. This is because these screenings tests "lack high specificity [and] are subject to cross-reactivity." After this initial screening, it is typical for a more accurate, specific test to be conducted.

In some areas, law enforcement uses on-site kits to collect oral fluid. (It is possible that law enforcement may be required to obtain a search warrant prior to taking this sample.) But it has not yet been shown whether these tests are accurate or reliable, and it is possible a false positive could result from environmental exposure.

It is possible that prior users of chronic cannabis users can test positive for THC even months or years after they have stopped using cannabis; there is evidence that cannabis metabolites can become stored in fat tissue and then be released due to stress or weight loss.

=== False negatives ===
Fat solubility of THC also makes detection in body fluids, which are mostly water, problematic, leading to false indication of non-impairment for users.

== Legal standards ==
In May 2016, the American Automobile Association (AAA) Foundation for Traffic Safety conducted an extensive study concluding that, "a quantitative threshold for per se laws for THC following cannabis use cannot be scientifically supported." Another study has stated that “[z]ero-limit DUID laws for cannabis based on analysis of carboxy-THC in blood or urine lack scientific support and cannot be defended." Despite these issues, some jurisdictions have adopted urine or blood metabolite per se or even zero tolerance standards.

=== Europe ===
Germany's blood serum (not whole blood like most standards) THC-A limit is 1 ng/mL.

THC (ng/ml)	Country
1	Belgium, Denmark, Ireland, Luxembourg, Netherlands (if other drugs are present)
2	Czech Republic, United Kingdom
3	Netherlands (if THC only is detected), Norway
9	Norway

Driving under the influence of drugs is a kind of road safety traffic offense information which can be exchanged by member states of the European Union in the scope of directive 2011/82/EU of 25 October 2011.

=== Americas ===
In Uruguay, the first nation to legalize cannabis, "any THC detectable in the body will deem a motorist impaired to drive". Reporting has indicated that blood tests would be utilized. Canadian draft regulations proposed in 2017 (Bill C-46) had summary conviction offences starting at 2 nanograms per milliliter.

==== United States ====
Some legal scholarship has argued that per se cannabis-DUID laws violate the Due Process Clause under the Fourteenth Amendment of the Constitution because they "subject drivers to criminal prosecutions without any real culpability."

===== Federal =====
At the federal level, the United States Department of Transportation regulates public transportation (e.g. pilots, bus drivers, and train operators) and commercial truckers. 49 CFR Part 199 and 49 CFR Part 40 set maximum urine concentration levels of THC-A as the threshold for impairment for regulated transportation occupations. As of January 1, 2018, the THC-A testing cutoffs were 50 ng/mL for an initial immunoassay test and 15 ng/mL for a confirmatory gas chromatography–mass spectrometry test.

===== State =====
All fifty states criminalize driving while under the influence of drugs. These state laws fall into three categories: (1) "zero tolerance" laws, which criminalizes driving with any amount of THC and/or its metabolites in the body; (2) "per se" laws, which criminalize driving with a certain level of THC in the body; (3) laws that focus on whether the driver was actually impaired or affected by THC; and (4) "permissible inference" laws, which allow an inference of impairment if the THC blood level is at least 5 ng/ml.

====== Arizona ======
Arizona Revised Statute § 28-1381(A)(3) makes it illegal to drive or be in actual physical control of a vehicle while there is cannabis or its metabolite in the body. The statute was challenged as violating the equal protection clauses of the federal and Arizona constitutions in State v. Hammonds, but the Court of Appeals of Arizona upheld the statute on the grounds that the "presence of an inactive and nonimpairing metabolite of an illicit drug in a driver's urine does not necessarily mean that there is no active component of that drug present in the driver's blood." In a law review article, attorney Joshua Snow argues that the court's reasoning is flawed because "there is no way of knowing when, how, or where the metabolite entered the body,"; thus, "the state cannot prove that an individual was operating a motor vehicle with the active controlled substance in the body."

Medical marijuana patients are not subject to prosecution under § 28-1381(A)(3) unless actual impairment can be shown. In 2010, Arizona passed the Arizona Medical Marijuana Act, § 36-2802, which provides that a "registered qualifying patient shall not be considered to be under the influence of marijuana solely because of the presence of metabolites of components of marijuana that appear in insufficient concentration to cause impairment."

In State ex rel. Montgomery v. Harris (2013), the Supreme Court of Arizona held that § 28-1381 applies only to metabolites capable of causing impairment. In this case, the defendant's blood tested positive for Carboxy-THC, a non-impairing metabolite of cannabis.

====== California ======
California Vehicle Code §23152(f) makes it unlawful for a person under the influence of any drug to drive a vehicle. For a person to be convicted under this statute, the drug or drugs "must have so far affected the nervous system, the brain, or muscles as to impair to an appreciable degree the ability to operate a vehicle in a manner like that of an ordinarily prudent and cautious person in full possession of his faculties." In People v. Torres, the defendant's urine tested positive for methamphetamine, and there was expert testimony that established that methamphetamine could impair a person's "judgment, focus, and psychomotor skills" so as to make driving unsafe; however, there was no evidence that the defendant's methamphetamine use actually impaired his driving ability the night he was arrested. Thus, the California Court of Appeal held there was insufficient evidence to support the defendant's conviction.

====== Colorado ======
Colorado has a "permissive inference" DUI law; Colorado statute § 42-4-1301(6)(a)(IV) provides that if "the driver's blood contained five nanograms or more of delta 9-tetrahydrocannabinol per milliliter in whole blood, as shown by analysis of defendant's blood, such fact gives rise to a permissible inference that the defendant was under the influence of one or more drugs."

====== Delaware ======
Delaware Statute § 4177(a)(2) makes it a crime to drive under the influence of any drug. §4177(a)(6) makes it a crime to drive when the blood contains, within 4 hours of driving "any amount of an illicit or recreational drug that is the result of the unlawful use or consumption of such illicit or recreational drug or any amount of a substance or compound that is the result of the unlawful use or consumption of an illicit or recreational drug prior to or during driving." Subsection 3(a) of §4177 provides that no person shall be convicted under (a)(6) when they did not ingest the drug prior to or during driving but only after they ceased driving—and only that post-driving ingestion caused their blood to contain the drug. Subsection 3(b) provides that no person shall be convicted under (a)(6) when they "consumed the drug or drugs detected according to the directions and terms of a lawfully obtained prescription for such drug or drugs; however, nothing in 3(a) or 3(b) prevent a driver from being prosecuted under § 4177(a)(2).

====== Georgia ======
Georgia Statute § 40-6-391 makes it to drive while there is "any amount of marijuana . . . present in the person's blood or urine, or both, including the metabolites and derivatives of each or both . . . ." Subsection (b) of the statute provides that being legally entitled to use a drug is not a defense to the statute if the person is still "rendered incapable of driving safely as a result" of using that drug.

====== Illinois ======
Illinois Vehicle Code 625 § 5/11-501 makes it a crime to drive or be in actual physical control of a vehicle while under the influence of any drug "to a degree that renders the person incapable of safely driving," (subsection (a)(3)) or while "there is any amount of a drug, substance, or compound in the person's breath, blood, other bodily substance, or urine resulting from the unlawful use or consumption of a controlled substance listed in the Illinois Controlled Substance Act..." (subsection (a)(6)). 11-501(a)(6) creates a strict liability offense (meaning the State does not need to prove anything regarding mental state)--but it does not create criminal liability for a person who ingests cannabis inadvertently or unknowingly. In People v. Gassman, 622 N.E.2d 845, appeal denied 642 N.E.2d 1291, defendant argued that 11-501(a)(6) violated due process and the equal protection clause, but the Appellate Court of Illinois, Second District, rejected his arguments. In People v. McPeak, a police officer smelled cannabis around defendant, found drug paraphernalia in his car, and defendant admitted to smoking "two hits" of cannabis one hour prior. But the Appellate Court of Illinois, Second District, found that the evidence was insufficient to sustain a conviction because there was no evidence that consuming that amount of cannabis would result in cannabis being left in his breath, blood, or urine one hour later, there was no evidence of odor of cannabis on his breath, and there was no evidence that defendant was impaired.

====== Indiana ======
Indiana Statute 9-30-5-1 makes it a crime to drive with cannabis or its metabolite in the body.

====== Iowa ======
Iowa Code section 321J.2(1)(c) criminalizes the operation of a motor vehicle while "any amount of a controlled substance is present" in the driver's blood or urine. In State v. Comried, the Iowa Supreme Court interpreted this statutory language to mean "any amount greater than zero"—even if that amount is nonimpairing. In State v. Childs, the defendant argued that Comried should be overruled because it relied on an Arizona decision that had since been overruled by State ex rel. Montgomery v. Harris, 322 P.3d 160 (2014), which held that the presence of a non-impairing metabolite of cannabis is not sufficient for a DUI conviction. The Iowa Supreme Court, however, declined to adopt the Harris rule and instead reaffirmed Comried.

====== Michigan ======
Section 257.625 of the Michigan Vehicle Code criminalizes driving a motor vehicle with "any amount of a controlled substance listed in schedule 1 under section 7212 of the public health code." (Cannabis is listed as a controlled substance.) In People v. Koon, 832 N.W.2d 724, the Supreme Court of Michigan held that drivers who possess a valid Michigan Medical Marijuana Act card are not subject to prosecution under § 257.625 unless the state can show they were "under the influence" while driving.

====== Minnesota ======
Minnesota Statute § 169A.20 makes it a crime for any person to drive while "under the influence of a controlled substance." According to the standard jury instructions, "There is no set standard as to the quantity of a controlled substance a person must ingest before [they are] regarded as being 'under the influence.' When a person is so affected by a controlled substance that the person does not possess that clearness of intellect and control of [themselves] that [they] otherwise would have, that person is under the influence of a controlled substance. If, as a result of consuming a controlled substance, the person's ability or capacity to [drive] is impaired, the statute has been violated." These standard jury instructions were cited by the Court of Appeals of Minnesota in an unpublished case, State v. Suber, 2008 WL 942622. In Suber, the Court of Appeals of Minnesota overturned the defendant's conviction, finding lack of sufficient evidence. The defendant admitted he had consumed cannabis about 17 hours before his arrest; police testified that defendant performed poorly on field sobriety tests; police testified that defendant's eyes appeared red and watery; and defendant's urine tested positive for cannabis. But the court still held that this evidence was not sufficient because the state's drug recognition expert testified that cannabis could bed detectable in urinalysis for seven to ten days after ingestion, the state did not have any direct proof that the defendant ingested cannabis in the hours leading up to him driving, and there was evidence to support defendant's story of innocence: that his eyes were red and watery due to lack of sleep, and that his performance on field sobriety tests was affected by the fact that he had Asperger's syndrome.

====== Nevada ======
Nevada Revised Statute § 484C.110(4) makes it unlawful to drive with 2 ng/mL of delta-9-tetrahydrocannabinol (cannabis) or 5 ng/mL of 11-OH-tetrahydrocannabinol (cannabis metabolite) present in their blood or urine.

====== New York ======
New York's Vehicle and Traffic Law § 1192(4) provides that "[n]o person shall operate a motor vehicle while the person's ability to operate such a motor vehicle is impaired by the use of a drug." Courts apply a four-step process in determining whether there is a prima facie case for a violation of § 1192(4): (1) defendant ingested a drug; (2) the drug is one proscribed by Public Health Law § 3306; (3) defendant drove after ingesting the drug; and (4) while driving, defendant's driving ability was impaired by the drug. But there is a qualification to this test where the ingested drug is cannabis: there must be a showing of substantial impairment. In People v. Shakemma, a police officer's observation of defendant's car swerving off of the road and onto the road shoulder by half a car width, of the smell of cannabis on her car, and of her red eyes and pinpoint pupils, did not rise to the level of showing substantial impairment. The District Court of New York dismissed state's case for lack of probable cause.

====== Ohio ======
Ohio Statute § 4511.19 makes it unlawful to drive with a concentration of cannabis of at least 10 ng/ml in their urine or 2 ng/ml in their blood or blood serum or plasma. If the person is the under the influence of alcohol, a drug of abuse, or a combination of them, then it is unlawful to drive with a concentration of cannabis metabolite of at least 15 ng/ml in their urine, or 5 ng/ml in their blood or blood serum or plasma. It is also unlawful to drive with a concentration of cannabis metabolite of 35 ng/ml in their urine or 50 ng/ml in their blood or blood serum or plasma.

====== Oklahoma ======
Oklahoma Statute 47 § 11-902 makes it unlawful to drive or be in actual physical control of a vehicle who has any amount of cannabis or one of its metabolites or analogs in their "blood, saliva, urine or any other bodily fluid at the time of a test . . . within two hours after [their] arrest."

====== Pennsylvania ======
Pennsylvania Statute § 3802(d)(1) makes it a crime to drive if there is any amount of cannabis, or cannabis metabolite, in the blood. The statute was constitutionally challenged as violating equal protection in Com v. Etchison, 916 A.2d 1169, appeal granted in part 935 A.2d 1267, affirmed 943 A.2d 262, but the Superior Court of Pennsylvania upheld the statute as constitutional.

====== Tennessee ======
Tennessee does not have a per se law for drug impaired driving; rather, Tennessee courts take a totality of the circumstances approach, examining factors such as erratic driving, performance on field sobriety tests, presence of drugs or paraphernalia, and observed behavior such as slurred speech and unsteadiness.

====== Utah ======
Utah Code Section 41-6a-502 criminalizes driving "under the influence of alcohol, any drug, or the combined influence of alcohol and any drug to a degree that renders the person incapable of safely operating a vehicle." Where a person is not under the influence of cannabis to the extent sufficient to be convicted under this DUI code section, but still has a detectable level of THC in their system, they can still be convicted under section 41-6a-517, which criminalizes driving with "any measurable controlled substance in the body." (THC is listed as a "controlled substance" under Section 58-37-4's.) In a law review article, attorney Joshua Snow has argued that this statute violates the Eighth Amendment to the U.S. Constitution as well as the Utah Constitution's Uniform Operation of Laws Clause.

====== Washington ======
Revised Code of Washington § 46.61.502 provides that a person is guilty of driving under the influence if, within two hours of driving, they have a THC concentration of 5.00 or higher as shown by analysis of their blood. The state legalized cannabis for recreational use in 2014. The research director of the Washington Traffic Safety Commission has called the 5.00-nanogram threshold "completely arbitrary," saying that it "wasn't backed by scientific theories then, and it's not backed by scientific theories now."

====== Wisconsin ======
Wisconsin Statute § 346.63(1)(am) makes it a crime to drive with "a detectable amount of a restricted controlled substance in his or her blood." (Delta-9-tetahydrocannabinol is a "restricted controlled substance" under Wis. Stat. § 340.01(50m).) § 346.63(1)(d) provides that it is a defense to (1)(am) if defendant proves by a preponderance of the evidence that at the time of the incident they had a valid prescription for delta-9-tetrahydrocannabinol. In State v. Smet, the defendant argued that § 346.63(1)(am) violated due process and the equal protection clause, but the Court of Appeals of Wisconsin rejected his arguments.

== See also ==
- Cannabis drug testing
- Driving under the influence
- Drug–impaired driving
- Drunk driving in the United States
- DUID
