= Juliana Cabral =

Brazilian footballer

- Juliana Cabral celebrating the silver medal at the Athens 2004 Olympic Games

Personal information
- Full name: Juliana Ribeiro Cabral
- Date of birth: 3 October 1981 (age 45)
- Place of birth: São Paulo, Brazil
- Height: 1.69 m (5 ft 6 1/2 in)
- Position: Defender

Youth career
- Pro Sport

Senior career*
Years	Team	Apps	(Gls)
1995–1996	Saad		
1997–2000	São Paulo		
2003	Corinthians		
2004	Kopparbergs/Göteborg FC	4	(0)
2006	Saad		
2007	Jaguariúna		
2008	Corinthians		

International career
1996–2006	Brazil		
Medal record
Representing Brazil
Olympic Games – Women's Football
Silver medal – second place	2004 Athens	Team competition
Pan American Games – Women's Football
Gold medal – first place	2003 Santo Domingo	Team competition
- * Club domestic league appearances and goals

Juliana Ribeiro Cabral (born 3 October 1981), commonly known as Juliana Cabral or simply Juliana, is a Brazilian former footballer who played as a defender for the Brazil women's national football team. At club level she represented several leading teams in Brazil and Kopparbergs/Göteborg FC of the Swedish Damallsvenskan.

After making her senior international debut as a 15-year-old, Juliana played for Brazil in the 1999 and 2003 editions of the FIFA Women's World Cup, and the 2000 and 2004 Olympics. At the 2004 tournament in Athens she captained Brazil's silver medal-winning team.

== Club career ==
As a child Juliana played street football with her brother, sometimes telling their disapproving mother that she was only taking part as the referee. At 10 or 11 years old she joined a team of footballing models run by the Flash Book modeling agency, which already contained Milene Domingues.

She progressed to playing for Saad Esporte Clube at 14 years old, then joined São Paulo FC where she won state and national titles. She was disappointed when São Paulo FC closed their women's section in 2000:

It was very sad, after Sydney the clubs closed their doors; sponsorships disappeared, and therefore the promoters of the championships. Our best players went to the U.S., and female football was almost extinguished here.

In February 2004 ambitious Damallsvenskan club Kopparbergs/Göteborg FC signed Juliana to a professional contract, part of a high-profile triple signing alongside Daniela and Hope Solo. She made four league appearances in Sweden.

She returned to Saad EC in October 2006, following a spell in the United States which had been disrupted by a foot injury.

Juliana also represented Palestra, Corinthians, Vasco, São Bernardo and Jaguariúna at club level. While playing for the latter in a training match against boys in April 2007 she suffered an anterior cruciate ligament injury, which curtailed transfer negotiations she had been undertaking with English and Spanish clubs.

In 2008 Juliana captained Corinthians and was unhappy when the club subsequently disbanded their women's section in March 2009. The disappointment brought about her playing retirement from football.

== International career ==
In 1996 Juliana debuted for the senior Brazil women's national football team as a 15 year old. She played in a 5–0 friendly win over Scotland at Estádio Parque São Jorge in December 1996. Her first competitive cap came in a 12–1 win over Colombia at the 1998 South American Women's Football Championship on 5 March 1998.

At the 1999 FIFA Women's World Cup Juliana was among eight players of Brazil's 20-player squad who were contracted to São Paulo FC. She became a regular starting player as Brazil came third. She was also a member of the Brazil team that participated in the 2000 Sydney Olympics and finished in fourth place.

Juliana retained her place at the 2003 FIFA Women's World Cup, in a much-changed Brazil squad. She was the captain and ever-present as Brazil were eliminated in the quarter-final by Sweden. She was still the national team captain for the 2004 Athens Olympics. She played in the 2–1 overtime final defeat by the United States, as Brazil collected silver medals.

A serious knee injury sustained in April 2007 caused Juliana to miss the 2007 Pan American Games, and ultimately the 2007 FIFA Women's World Cup.

== Style of play ==
Juliana characterised herself as a ball-playing but tough zagueira (transl. central defender), like Mauro Galvão or Carlos Gamarra. She had started out as a midfielder, before being retrained as a defender by her Saad, São Paulo FC and Brazil coach Zé Duarte.

== Personal life ==
Juliana is an activist athlete. After the 2004 Athens Olympics she organised a letter from the silver medal-winning team to the Brazilian Football Confederation (CBF), calling on them to improve the situation of women's football in Brazil. Alongside her outdoor football career she also played futebol de salão for Associação Sabesp.

At the 2007 Pan American Games, injured Juliana instead worked as a sports commentator for BandSports. She was happy to work alongside Silvio Luiz. She continued to work as a commentator and sports journalist for several media outlets including RedeTV!, Rádio Globo and ESPN.

Having returned to fitness, Juliana was disappointed to be left out of Brazil's squad for the 2008 Beijing Olympics. She felt the decision was a reaction to opinions she had voiced during her commentaries.
