= Cannabis and sports =

Legality and use of cannabis in sports

The use of cannabis by athletes has been banned by many sports commissions. However, some have relaxed their policies as societal attitudes towards its use have shifted. The prohibition of cannabis use in sports has been described as "one of the most controversial issues in anti-doping".

There is no scientific consensus regarding the performance-enhancing effects of cannabis, with one 2018 paper reporting "there is no evidence for cannabis use as a performance-enhancing drug". Other reasons cited for banning its use include an increased risk of injury in-competition and the view that users of cannabis are not good role models.

Calls for eliminating cannabis testing have come from the perspective of better pain management and reducing usage of opioids. Athletes such as Eugene Monroe and Derrick Morgan have called for further investigation into its potential for treating and preventing concussions.

== World Anti-Doping Agency ==
Following the 1998 Tour de France doping scandal, the International Olympic Committee (IOC) convened the First World Conference on Doping in Lausanne, Switzerland, in February 1999. From this conference the World Anti-Doping Agency (WADA) was formed in November 1999 to "lead a collaborative worldwide movement for doping-free sport" through activities such as "scientific research, education, and development of anti-doping capacities". In 2004, WADA published the World Anti-Doping Code and included cannabis among the substances prohibited by the code. As of 2021, there are more than 700 sports organization that adhere to the code; these include the International Olympic Committee, International Paralympic Committee, national anti-doping agencies, and various professional sports leagues.

WADA relaxed its policy towards cannabis in 2013, increasing from 15 ng/mL to 150 ng/mL the level of THC metabolite allowed in urine before an athlete is considered to have failed a drug test. Said WADA Director of Communications Julie Masse: "We wanted to focus on the athletes that abuse the substance in competition. This should exclude cases where marijuana is not used in competition." The 150 ng/mL threshold also allows for a 180 ng/mL "Decision Limit" to be used to account for any uncertainties in measurement above a certain level of confidence. According to WADA statistics, the percentage of failed drug tests for cannabis use dropped from 9.0% in 2012 to 2.4% in 2014.

WADA's policy towards cannabis came under scrutiny in 2021 following the banning of U.S. track and field athlete Sha'Carri Richardson from the Tokyo Summer Olympics. The suspension was criticized by U.S. Representatives Barbara Lee, Earl Blumenauer, and 16 other members of Congress who wrote that the policy was "outdated and restrictive" and that the United States Anti-Doping Agency (USADA) and WADA should "re-evaluate its criteria and decision to include cannabis, specifically tetrahydrocannabinol (THC) as a prohibited substance". USADA wrote to Representatives Alexandria Ocasio-Cortez and Jamie Raskin agreeing that "Ms. Richardson's exclusion from the Tokyo Olympic Games is a heartbreaking situation and that the World Anti-Doping Agency's rules concerning marijuana must change". It also noted that as a signatory to the World Anti-Doping Code, USADA has an obligation to enforce the rules regarding cannabis use, and that changing the rules might be problematic as the vast majority of countries still criminalize the drug. The Office of National Drug Control Policy stated that it would meet with WADA to "gather additional information on its cannabis policies".

In September 2021, WADA announced that it would conduct a review to determine whether cannabis should remain on the list of prohibited substances. A press release stated: "Following receipt of requests from a number of stakeholders, the [Executive Committee] endorsed the decision of the List Expert Advisory Group to initiate in 2022 a scientific review of the status of cannabis. Cannabis is currently prohibited in competition and will continue to be in 2022."

In September 2022, WADA announced that cannabis would remain on the list of banned substances, concluding that its usage continues, "at this time, to be against the spirit of sport across a range of areas as listed in the Code." WADA further stated that it "plans to continue research in this area in relation with THC's potential performance enhancing effects, its impact on the health of athletes and also in relation to perceptions of cannabis from athletes, experts and others around the world."

== College and youth sports ==
Testing for cannabis by the National Collegiate Athletic Association (NCAA) began when it instituted a comprehensive drug testing program in 1986. Initially a 15 ng/mL threshold was established and any positive test resulted in a full-season suspension. In 2013 the threshold was lowered to 5 ng/mL while the penalty was relaxed to a half-season suspension. The threshold was then raised to 15 ng/mL in 2017, 35 ng/mL in 2019, and 150 ng/mL in 2022. Also in 2022, the NCAA Committee on Competitive Safeguards and Medical Aspects of Sports (CSMAS) recommended a relaxed penalty structure for divisions to adopt. In September 2023, it recommended that testing for cannabis be eliminated in all three divisions. In June 2024, the Division I Council voted to remove cannabis from the list of banned substances in the division. This meant cannabis would no longer be tested for in Division I postseason, though individual schools can still opt to test for it during the regular season.

A 2015 Associated Press investigation found that 23 of 57 schools analyzed had reduced penalties for cannabis use since 2005. A 2014 medical review found that almost 28% of college athletes in the United States self reported using cannabis in the past year.

A pamphlet produced by the United States Department of Justice in the 1990s for youth sports coaches admonished them to "Explain that marijuana is illegal and that the athlete can be arrested or suspended from school and sports for using it", and listed several deleterious physical and psychological effects of marijuana including "decreased stamina, weight gain, and reduced muscle strength.. . [l]aziness, lack of motivation, loss of control, and poor decisionmaking".

== Individual sports ==
=== American football ===
In March 2020, the National Football League (NFL) changed its policy regarding cannabis after signing a new collective bargaining agreement with the National Football League Players Association (NFLPA). The agreement stipulated that positive tests would no longer result in a suspension and that players would only be suspended for missing multiple tests or refusing treatment. It also shortened the timeframe for which players would be tested from four months to two weeks, and raised the threshold for a positive test from 35 ng/mL of THC metabolite to 150 (prior to 2014 the threshold was set at 15). All-Pro running back Ricky Williams is among the players that have been suspended under the league's old policy, failing multiple tests that led him to miss the entire 2004 and 2006 seasons.

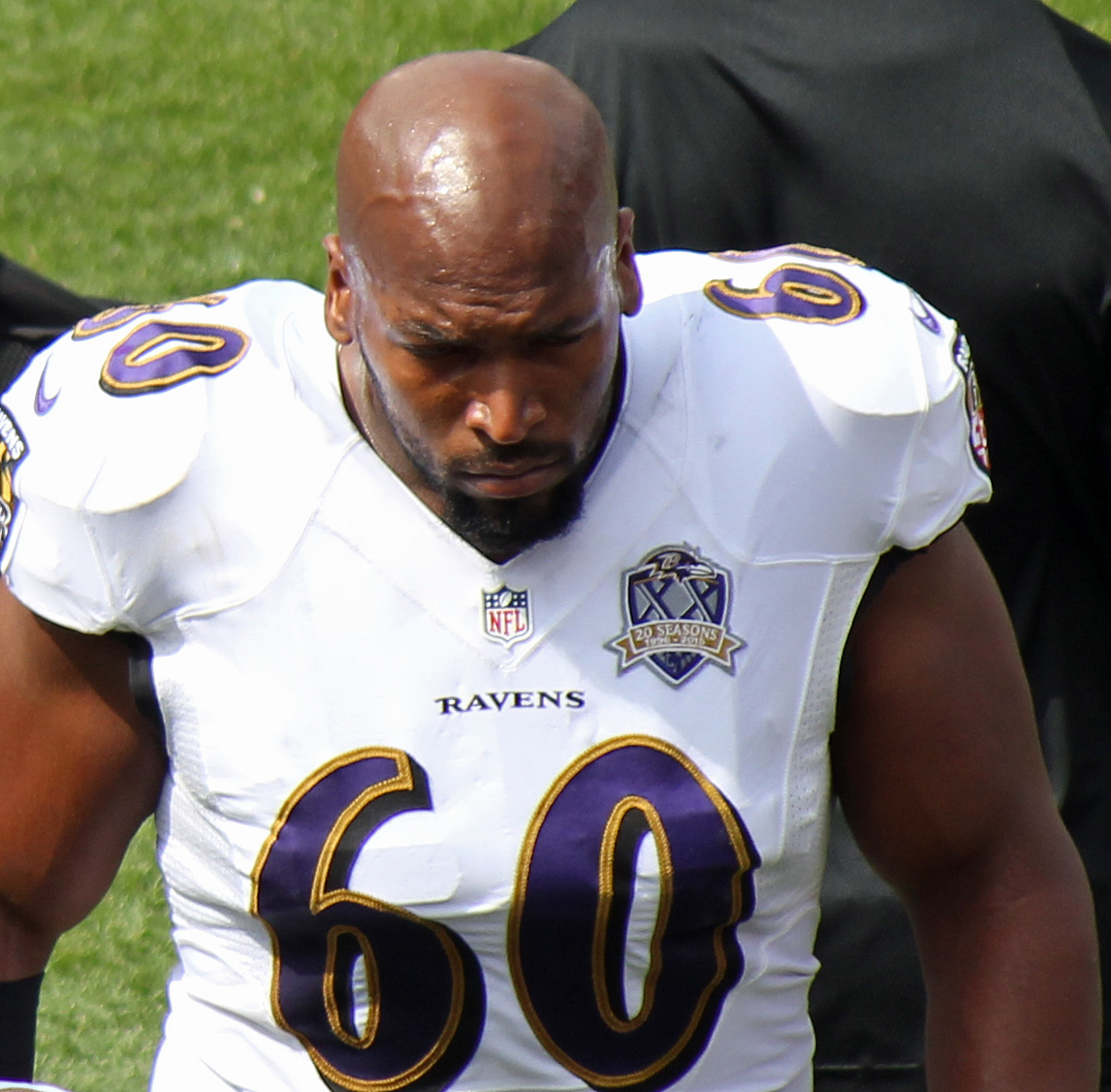
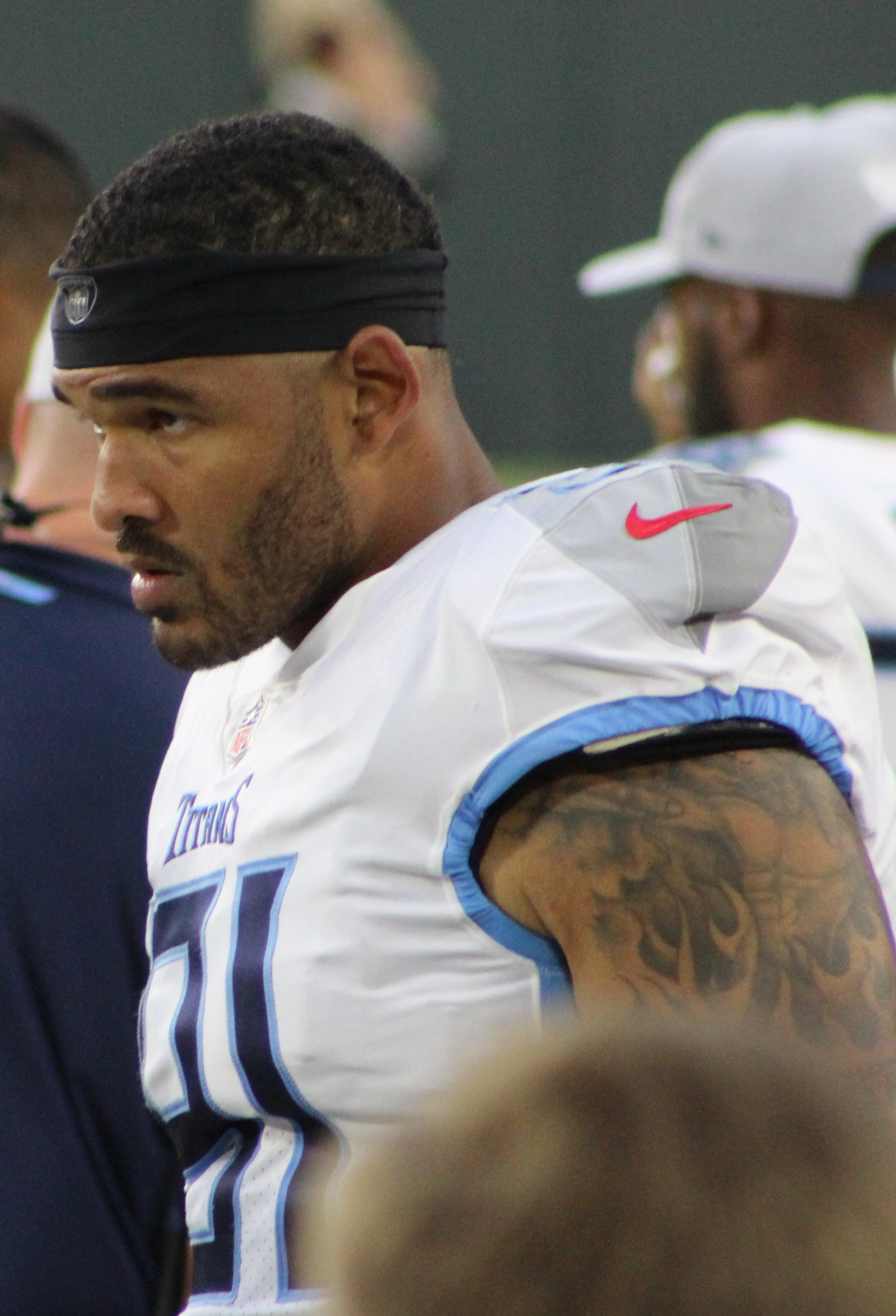
In 2016, Eugene Monroe (left) and Derrick Morgan (right) became the first two active National Football League players to publicly challenge the league's policy towards cannabis.

In 2016, Eugene Monroe and Derrick Morgan became the first active NFL players to publicly challenge the league's policy of suspending players for cannabis use. A number of retired players have also advocated for the change, including Jim McMahon, Jake Plummer, Kyle Turley, Nate Jackson, Eben Britton, Leonard Marshall, Marvin Washington, Todd Herremans, Boo Williams, and Ricky Williams. In 2016, several of these active and retired players signed a letter penned by Doctors for Cannabis Regulation requesting that the NFL change its policy regarding cannabis. Reasons that have been cited in advocating for the change include the potential use of cannabis as a neuroprotectant, its use for pain relief as an opioid alternative, and the hypocrisy of the league promoting the use of alcohol.

In 2018, running back Mike James petitioned the NFL for a therapeutic use exemption (TUE) to the league's ban on cannabis use. James cited a previous addiction to opioid drugs and argued that he should be allowed to use cannabis for pain relief instead. The petition was subsequently denied.

In 2016, the NFL announced the formation of a committee to study issues of pain management among players, including the use of cannabis as medicine. In June 2021, the NFL announced that it would award $1 million in funding for such research. In February 2022 the NFL announced the awarding of two grants for cannabis research, one of which would additionally investigate its benefits in treating concussions.

In 2017, former New York Jets defensive end Marvin Washington was part of a lawsuit filed against Attorney General Jeff Sessions, challenging the classification of cannabis as a Schedule I drug and citing the racist origins of cannabis laws as a reason why its prohibition is unconstitutional. Following the lawsuit's dismissal, the U.S. Supreme Court declined to take up the case in October 2020.

During the early 2000s, All-Pro center Mark Stepnoski served as president of the Texas chapter of the National Organization for the Reform of Marijuana Laws. The Office of National Drug Control Policy criticized his advocacy by saying it could encourage young people to use the drug. His activism also caused his high school alma mater, Cathedral Preparatory School, to cancel his induction into the school's athletic hall of fame.

Other players that have advocated for legalization include Eugene Monroe, chairman of the "Yes on 4" campaign in Maryland that was formed to support the passage of Question 4 in 2022. Jim McMahon appeared in a TV ad supporting the passage of a 2016 Arizona legalization measure.

NFL players who are entrepreneurs in the cannabis industry include Calvin Johnson, Rob Sims, Marshawn Lynch, Tiki Barber, Kyle Turley, Jordan Reed, Marvin Washington, Ricky Williams, and Ryan Shazier. Johnson and Sims, who are business partners, announced a partnership with Harvard University in 2019 to study the effects of cannabis on chronic traumatic encephalopathy (CTE) and its benefits in managing pain. They also announced a six-figure donation to the International Phytomedicines and Medical Cannabis Institute at Harvard.

=== Association football ===
National Women's Soccer League (NWSL) player Megan Rapinoe has served as an "athlete ambassador" for a CBD startup company. Scottish club Hamilton Academical attracted attention in 2018 when they were sponsored by a local company which also involved the renaming of their ground as the Hope CBD Stadium.

=== Baseball ===
Major League Baseball (MLB) began testing players in Minor League Baseball (MiLB) for performance-enhancing substances and drugs of abuse in 2001. Testing for MLB players began in 2003 after MLB and the MLB Players Association agreed to it through collective bargaining. However, MLB players were only tested for cannabis if there was "reasonable cause" to do so, or if it was mandated by a drug treatment program.

Cannabis was on the list of drugs of abuse until the 2019–2020 offseason, when THC and CBD were removed. Players will still be tested for synthetic cannabinoids, and are still subject to disciplinary action if they are caught using cannabis, for possession, or driving under the influence.

In June 2022, MLB began allowing teams to accept sponsorships for CBD products that are certified by NSF International as not having psychoactive levels of THC. The products will be eligible to be advertised during MLB broadcasts as well as on team jerseys. In April 2023, the Chicago Cubs became the first MLB team to be sponsored by a CBD company.

In October 2022, MLB announced a partnership with Charlotte's Web CBD to make it the "Official CBD of Major League Baseball" and feature the MLB logo on a line of Charlotte's Web products that will include topicals, gummies, and oral sprays. The three-year, $30.5 million deal also involved MLB receiving a number of shares in the company.

=== Basketball ===
The National Basketball Association (NBA) removed cannabis from the list of drugs it tests for under a seven-year collective bargaining agreement reached in April 2023. The league initially adopted the policy for the 2020 NBA Bubble during the COVID-19 pandemic, then extended it for the 2020–21, 2021–22, and 2022–23 NBA seasons. Commissioner Adam Silver stated in 2020: "We decided that, given all the things that were happening in society, given all the pressures and stress that players were under, that we didn't need to act as Big Brother right now." Previously Silver had stated that he was "very interested in the science when it comes to medical marijuana" and that he does not see cannabis use as an ethical or moral issue. He also noted in 2018 that multiple players have told him that cannabis helps them deal with their anxiety.

In 2017, NBA player Al Harrington conducted an interview with former commissioner David Stern regarding the topic of cannabis use by players. Stern told Harrington during the interview: "I'm now at the point where personally I think [cannabis] probably should be removed from the banned list. You've persuaded me." NBA head coach Steve Kerr has also expressed support for allowing the use of cannabis in professional sports.

NBA players that have advocated for the legalization of cannabis include Harrington, Cliff Robinson, and Oscar Robertson. Harrington appeared in a video ad to endorse California's Proposition 64 in 2016. Robertson appeared in a TV ad endorsing an Ohio ballot measure to legalize cannabis in 2015.

A seven-year collective bargaining agreement reached in 2023 allows NBA players to invest in and promote CBD companies and products without restriction, but for non-CBD cannabis companies players can have only a "passive, non-controlling interest", while non-CBD cannabis products cannot be promoted by players. Active and retired NBA players that are entrepreneurs in the cannabis industry or that have entered into business partnerships include Kevin Durant, Allen Iverson, Al Harrington, Shawn Kemp, Cliff Robinson, Larry Hughes, Chris Webber, Isiah Thomas, Ben Wallace, Dwyane Wade, Carmelo Anthony, John Wall, John Salley, and Paul Pierce. Iverson announced a partnership with Harrington's company Viola Brands in 2021. In addition to collaborating on various business initiatives, the pair announced they would engage in educational efforts to reduce the stigma surrounding cannabis use. Durant announced a separate partnership in 2021 with the company Weedmaps to "deconstruct the negative stereotypes associated with cannabis while elevating the conversation around the plant's potential for athlete wellness and recovery".

In the Women's National Basketball Association (WNBA), cannabis is reported to be a banned substance that the league tests and penalizes players for. WNBA player Sue Bird has served as an "athlete ambassador" for a cannabidiol (CBD) startup company.

=== Cricket ===
David Murray, who played cricket in the 1970s, said after his career that he used cannabis "before and after the day's play, but never in the breaks – you can't do that". Ian Botham was suspended for 63 days by the England and Wales Cricket Board (ECB) in 1986 after he admitted in an interview that he had smoked cannabis. Wasim Akram, Waqar Younis, Aqib Javed, and Mushtaq Ahmed of the Pakistani national cricket team were arrested in Grenada in April 1993 for possession of cannabis. In 1995, Stephen Fleming was caught and admitted to smoking with teammates Matthew Hart and Dion Nash while on tour at their hotel. They were suspended.

While touring New Zealand in 1996–1997, a restaurant in Christchurch accused Phil Tufnell of smoking cannabis in their bathroom. As the restaurant had a reputation for making up stories about celebrities, the English team's management agreed with Tufnell's denials. Paul Smith retired in 1997 and acknowledged using cannabis; despite his retirement, the ECB suspended him for 22 months. In 2001, five South African players, Roger Telemachus, André Nel, Paul Adams, Justin Kemp, and Herschelle Gibbs, were caught smoking it at a party. They were fined R10,000. Dermot Reeve revealed that he was addicted to cocaine in 2005, and also acknowledged that he had used cannabis during the 1990s while he was an active player, but said that he never used it during the cricket season. In May 2005, Keith Piper of the Warwickshire County Cricket Club was suspended for the remainder of the season for cannabis. Also in 2005, an Australian cricket team from Inverloch provided chocolate cupcakes to a team from Nerrina and did not inform them that they contained cannabis.

=== Diving ===
In 2011, an American national team diver was suspended for a year after testing positive for cannabis.

=== Golf ===
In 2018, Coleman Bentley of Golf Digest investigated the effects of cannabis on golfers and summarized:

Like everything else in life, moderation is key. A little bit of marijuana—in this case, around 18 milligrams—can help to relax muscles and calm nerves, aiding distance and overall tee-to-green performance. Consume in excess of that, however, and focus, energy, hand-eye coordination, and munchies become major impediments. In the most general terms, marijuana use on the golf course reflected our experience with alcohol: A little goes a long way, but a little too much will have you playing from the wrong fairway for the rest of the afternoon.

In 2019, High Times published tips for "toking up and teeing off". Golf Magazine published "5 reasons why a golfer could benefit from using CBD" in 2020.

In 2019, Robert Garrigus became the first professional golfer suspended for testing positive for cannabis. He has openly criticized the PGA Tour's cannabis policy. In October 2019, Matt Every was suspended for the same reason. In 2020, The New York Times said PGA Tour and Champions Tour players "have become more vocal about using CBD to treat their ailments since the compound was removed from banned substances list in 2018".

=== Hockey ===
According to a 2013 article by The Denver Post, the National Hockey League (NHL) was alone among the big four North American professional sports leagues (NFL, NBA, MLB, and NHL) in not punishing players for cannabis use. Though cannabis was still tested for according to the article, a positive test could only result in a referral for treatment by the players union or a possible punishment "in house" by individual teams. The policy was first instituted in 1996 according to NHL deputy commissioner Bill Daly.

NHL players Riley Cote and Darren McCarty have been outspoken regarding their personal experience using cannabis and the medical benefits it has provided them. Cote co-founded an organization called Athletes for Care which advocates for athletes on issues of health and safety including the use of cannabis as medicine.

=== Mixed martial arts ===
In January 2021, the United States Anti-Doping Agency and Ultimate Fighting Championship (UFC) announced a change to the drug testing that USADA conducts for the UFC. Under the new policy, fighters will no longer be punished for cannabis use except in cases where "further evidence demonstrates the substance was taken for performance-enhancing purposes such as alleviating pain or anxiety". Jeff Novitzky, senior vice president of athlete health and performance for the UFC, said clear signs of intoxication would need to be present such as "bloodshot eyes, they smell like marijuana, they're slurring or a far-off gaze". Prior to the change a 180 ng/mL threshold was set in place but it was determined that this could not be definitively said to indicate intoxication. The change had no effect on the fact that the testing policies of state agencies such as the Nevada State Athletic Commission still apply.

In July 2019, UFC announced a partnership with Aurora Cannabis to conduct research on the effectiveness of CBD in areas of wound care, recovery, pain, and inflammation, using UFC fighters as test subjects. In 2020 it was announced that the partnership had been terminated, however.

In January 2020, MMA fighter Elias Theodorou became the first North American athlete to receive a therapeutic use exemption for the use of cannabis, granted by the British Columbia Athletic Commission. In May 2021 he received the first such exemption in the U.S., granted by the Colorado Combative Sports Commission.

In March 2021, UFC announced a five year agreement with Love Hemp to name it the Official Global CBD Partner of UFC.

In May 2021, the Florida State Boxing Commission announced that it would stop testing fighters for cannabis use, based on the recommendation of the Association of Boxing Commissions medical advisory committee and following the lead of the new policy announced by UFC and USADA earlier in the year.

In July 2021, the Nevada State Athletic Commission voted to stop punishing fighters for cannabis use. UFC fighter Nick Diaz received a five year suspension from the commission in 2015 for repeat cannabis violations, though the suspension was later reduced to a year and a half.

=== Motorsport ===
The Fédération Internationale de l'Automobile (FIA), the sanctioning body for global auto racing, including Formula One, has banned drivers for cannabis use. The FIA follows WADA protocol. As of 2021, cannabinoids are listed by WADA as prohibited in-competition, except CBD, which is specifically exempted.

In 2017, NASCAR ordered a team to remove a sponsorship decal for a cannabis company. As of the 2021 season, NASCAR allows sponsorship from CBD companies on the condition that advertised products contain less than 0.3% THC. The first CBD-sponsored NASCAR event was held in 2021, the Pocono Organics CBD 325 at Pocono Raceway.

On January 11, 2022, NASCAR team Richard Childress Racing announced a sponsorship deal with 3CHI. RACER referred to the deal as "the first hemp-based consumer brand sponsorship across all major professional sports." The sponsorship approval followed a lengthy process which involved testing the product at a NASCAR-approved lab to ensure compliance with the 2018 United States farm bill. Also in 2022, NASCAR Xfinity Series driver Natalie Decker was forced to miss the 2022 Wawa 250 because her sponsor, a CBD beverage company, was still awaiting approval from NASCAR.

=== Rugby football ===
In 1999, the England national rugby union team captain Lawrence Dallaglio was investigated by the Rugby Football Union over claims he had smoked cannabis whilst on a rugby tour as well as dealing drugs. He was later stripped of the captaincy as a result.

=== Skateboarding ===
A medical review found that "cannabis consumption was found to be highest among athletes seeking the high risk and excitement of competing in extreme sports", listing skateboarding as a specific example. The first cannabis related suspension for skateboarding occurred in 2019, of a competitor in run-ups to the 2020 Summer Olympics.

When Chad Muska was partnered with éS, he designed a skate shoe with a "weed stash spot", a pocket in the tongue of the shoe. This is something he started doing due to his own cannabis consumption, saying "It was definitely a place to stash weed in...That was kind of the main goal." When he left the brand and partnered with Four Star Distribution to form Circa, he took this design with him, implementing it in various shoes with various methods; some used a zipper pocket, others used Velcro. The design was picked up by other companies such as Osiris, but has since fallen out of fashion.

=== Snowboarding ===
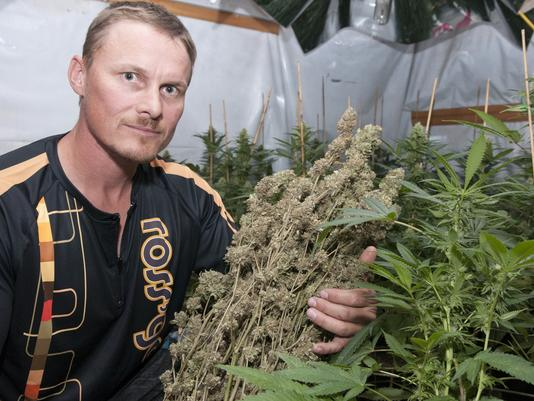
Since his ordeal at the 1998 Olympics, Canadian Ross Rebagliati launched a cannabis business in 2013 that he named Ross' Gold.

A gold medal in men's snowboarding was temporarily rescinded at the 1998 Winter Olympics after Canadian Ross Rebagliati tested positive for cannabis use. A drug test showed that he had 17.8 ng/mL of THC metabolite in his system, slightly higher than the 15 ng/mL threshold used by the International Ski Federation. The IOC executive board voted 3–2 to disqualify him from competition on February 11, 1998, which the Canadian Olympic Association immediately appealed. Rebagliati maintained his innocence and said that he had tested positive due to exposure to secondhand smoke. On February 13 an appeals court ruled in Rebagliati's favor, due to the fact that cannabis had not been officially banned by the IOC yet (it was banned shortly thereafter in April) and therefore the IOC had no authority to strip the medal. No charges were filed against Rebagliati after he was questioned by Japanese police for seven hours regarding the matter. He was put on the No Fly List and banned from entering the United States, however, which prevented him from participating in future competitions such as the X Games.

=== Sumo ===
Beginning in August 2008, a cannabis scandal resulted in four sekitori ranked sumo wrestlers, Wakanohō, Rohō, Hakurozan and Wakakirin, being dismissed from professional sumo, and the chairman of the Japan Sumo Association (JSA), Kitanoumi Toshimitsu, resigned his post. It was the first case in which active wrestlers have been dismissed from sumo. After that, the JSA added rules that any retirement package for dismissed members would be reduced or denied, and that those who use illegal drugs would be dismissed without benefits. According to The Japan Times, it was the largest sports scandal of drugs that Japan had ever seen.

In July 2021, second division wrestler Takagenji was announced to have failed a test for cannabis. An investigation found that Takagenji, who was already on a warning for an unrelated prior matter, had smoked cannabis on at eight occasions, and he was dismissed by the JSA on July 30.

=== Swimming ===
In February 2009, a photograph of Michael Phelps using a bong went viral; this resulted in a three-month suspension by USA Swimming and the loss of his sponsorship with the Kellogg Company. Phelps admitted that the photo, which was taken at a party at the University of South Carolina, was authentic. He publicly apologized, saying his behavior was "inappropriate".

=== Track and field ===
USA Track & Field (USATF) said "the merit of the World Anti-Doping Agency rules related to THC should be reevaluated" after the ban of Sha'Carri Richardson from the 2020 Summer Olympics (held in 2021). The U.S. White House spokesperson, Jen Psaki concurred, saying "maybe we should take another look at" the rules for athletes.

U.S. long jumper Tara Davis-Woodhall was stripped of her national title and suspended after testing positive for cannabis in February 2023. Her suspension was reduced to one month after receiving credit for completing a substance abuse treatment program.

== Effects of cannabis in sports ==
There's been a lot of recent interest in how cannabis and running intersect, especially with the rise of CBD products aimed at athletes. While the direct performance benefits of cannabis aren't clear cut, emerging evidence suggests it might offer some indirect perks for runners, mainly around recovery and motivation. For instance, a study by York Williams found that a majority of physically active cannabis users reported using it alongside exercise to make workouts more enjoyable and help with recovery. Around 70% even said it boosted their motivation to get moving. More recently, Zeiger found that 93% of surveyed participants felt CBD helped with exercise recovery, and 87% said the same about products containing THC.

Beyond recovery, cannabis might also shape the psychological side of running. A 2024 study showed that runners who inhaled CBD dominant cannabis before treadmill sessions reported enjoying the workout more and without any noticeable cognitive slowdown. Other research found similar benefits when people took CBD before moderate intensity endurance exercise; mood and overall affect improved, which could make runs feel less like a grind and more like something to look forward to. This is especially relevant for casual or recreational runners who lean heavily on motivation and enjoyment to keep running. Some users even report that cannabis helps with pre-run anxiety and getting into a mental "flow" state.

There are also downsides. THC-heavy strains can impair coordination and slow reaction time. Research like Kramer's shows that regular cannabis use doesn't improve core performance metrics like VO₂ max.

== See also ==
- Legality of cannabis
- Effects of cannabis
- Politics and sports
- Athlete activism
