= Duquenois–Levine reagent =

Marijuana test

The Duquenois reagent is used in the Rapid Modified Duquenois–Levine test (also known as the simple Rapid Duquenois Test), which is an established screening test for the presence of cannabis. The test was initially developed in the 1930s by the French medical biochemist Pierre Duquénois (1904–1986) and was adopted in the 1950s by the United Nations as the preferred test for cannabis. The test was originally claimed to be specific to cannabis.

After several modifications, it became known as the Duquenois–Levine test. However, in the 1960s and 70s various studies showed that the test was not specific to cannabis. In 1973, the Supreme Court of Wisconsin ruled the D–L test insufficient evidence for demonstrating that a substance was cannabis, specifically noting that the D–L tests used "are not exclusive or specific for marijuana."

The test is one of several forms of modern cannabis drug testing.

== Specificity ==
In the 1960s and 1970s, various studies showed that the D–L test was not specific to cannabis, although some flawed studies claimed to show the opposite. A 1969 UK government scientist reported twenty-five plant substances giving a D–L test result very similar to that of cannabis and warned that the D–L test "should never be relied upon as the only positive evidence." Another 1969 study found false positives from "a variety of vegetable extracts".

A 1972 study found that the D–L test would test positive for many commonly occurring plant substances known as resorcinols, which are found in over-the-counter medicines. For instance, Sucrets lozenges tested positive for marijuana. This study concluded that the D–L test is useful only as a "screen" test and was not sufficiently selective to be relied upon for "identification". Still another study, in 1974, showed that 12 of 40 plant oils and extracts studied gave positive D–L test results. In 1975, Dr. Marc Kurzman at the University of Minnesota, in collaboration with fourteen other scientists, published a study in The Journal of Criminal Defense that concluded: "The microscopic and chemical screening tests presently used in marijuana analysis are not specific even in combination for 'marijuana' defined in any way." In the 35 years since that study was published, no one has ever refuted this finding.

The study most cited in favour of the specificity of the D–L test is Thornton and Nakamura (1972). The authors themselves reported that the D–L test gave false positives, but declared the D–L test confirmatory when combined with the presence of cystolithic hairs, which marijuana plants possess. However, many plant species have such hairs, and the study only confirmed that 82 of them did not give D–L test false positives.

A 2000 study by the US NIST examined 12 chemical spot tests and concluded that all the tests examined "may indicate a specific drug or class of drugs is in the sample, but the tests are not always specific for a single drug or [class]". The study also noted that "mace, nutmeg and tea reacted with the modified Duquenois–Levine [test]".

A 2012 Brazilian study tested 40 vegetal drugs with the Duquenois–Levine test and obtained false positive results from Chilean boldo (Peumus boldus Molina), pot marigold (Calendula officinalis L.), leather hat (Echinodorus grandiflorus (Cham. & Schltdl.) Micheli.), cecropia (Cecropia hololeuca Miq.), lemon balm (Melissa officinalis), anise (Pimpinella anisum L.), guaraná (Paulinia cupana Kunth.), jaborandi (Pilocarpus jaborandi Holmes.) and laurel (Laurus nobilis L.).

== Process ==
The reagent can be prepared by adding 2 grams of vanillin and 2.5 milliliters of acetaldehyde to 100 milliliters of ethanol.

The test is performed by placing approximately 10 to 20 milligrams of a target substance in a glass test tube, then 10 drops of the Duquenois reagent. After shaking, 10 drops of concentrated hydrochloric acid are added, and the tube is again shaken. Any color that results after the hydrochloric acid step is recorded. Twenty drops of chloroform (or similar solvent) are then added, and the tube is vortexed, then allowed to settle and separate into two layers. Any color that transfers into the organic layer is recorded.

Marijuana (as well as a variety of other plant substances) becomes purple with the addition of the Duquenois reagent and hydrochloric acid. Upon addition of the organic solvent, the purple color transfers to the organic layer, indicating that cannabinoids may be present.

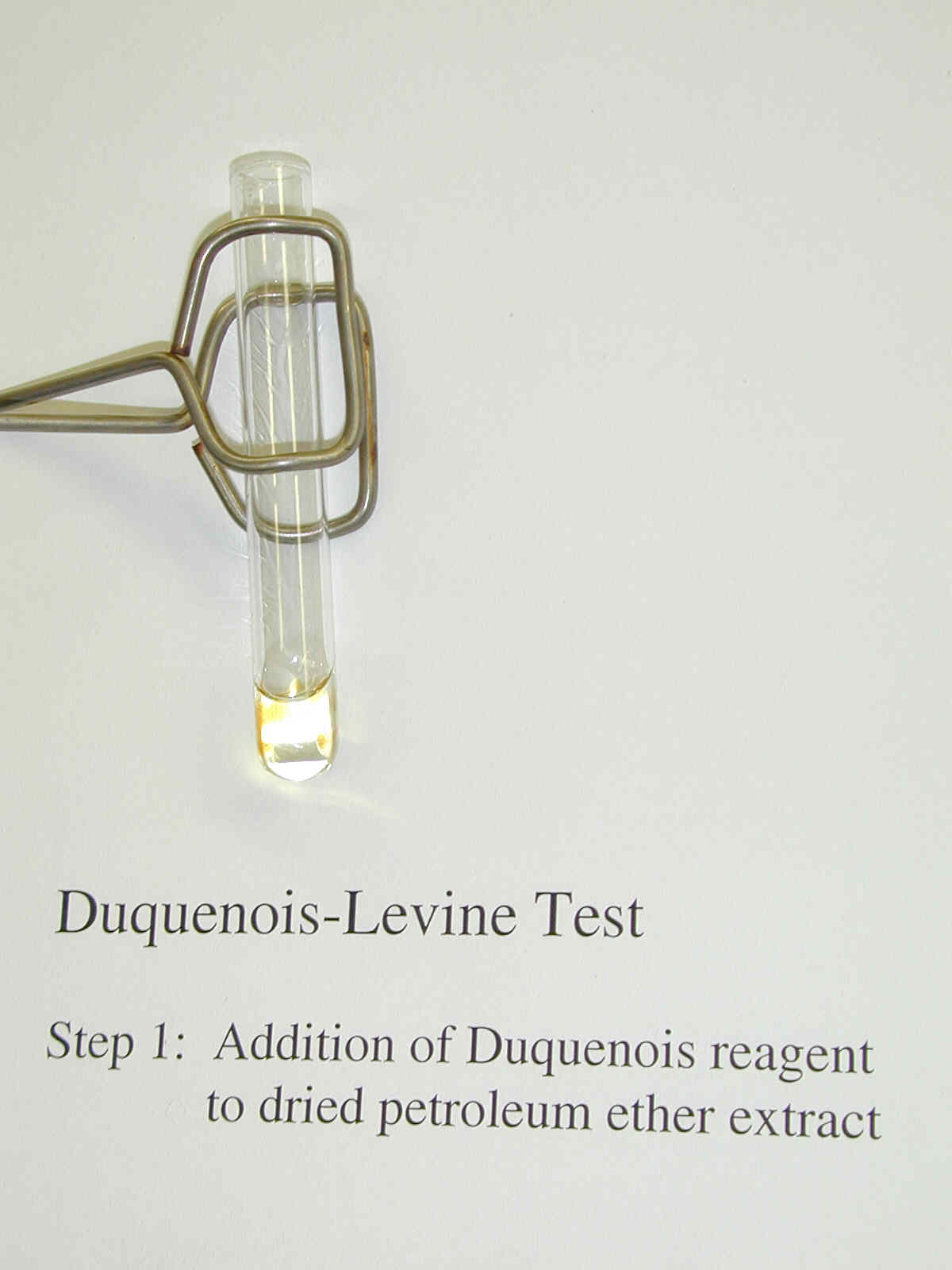
Step 1 – addition of Duquenois reagent to dried petroleum ether extract

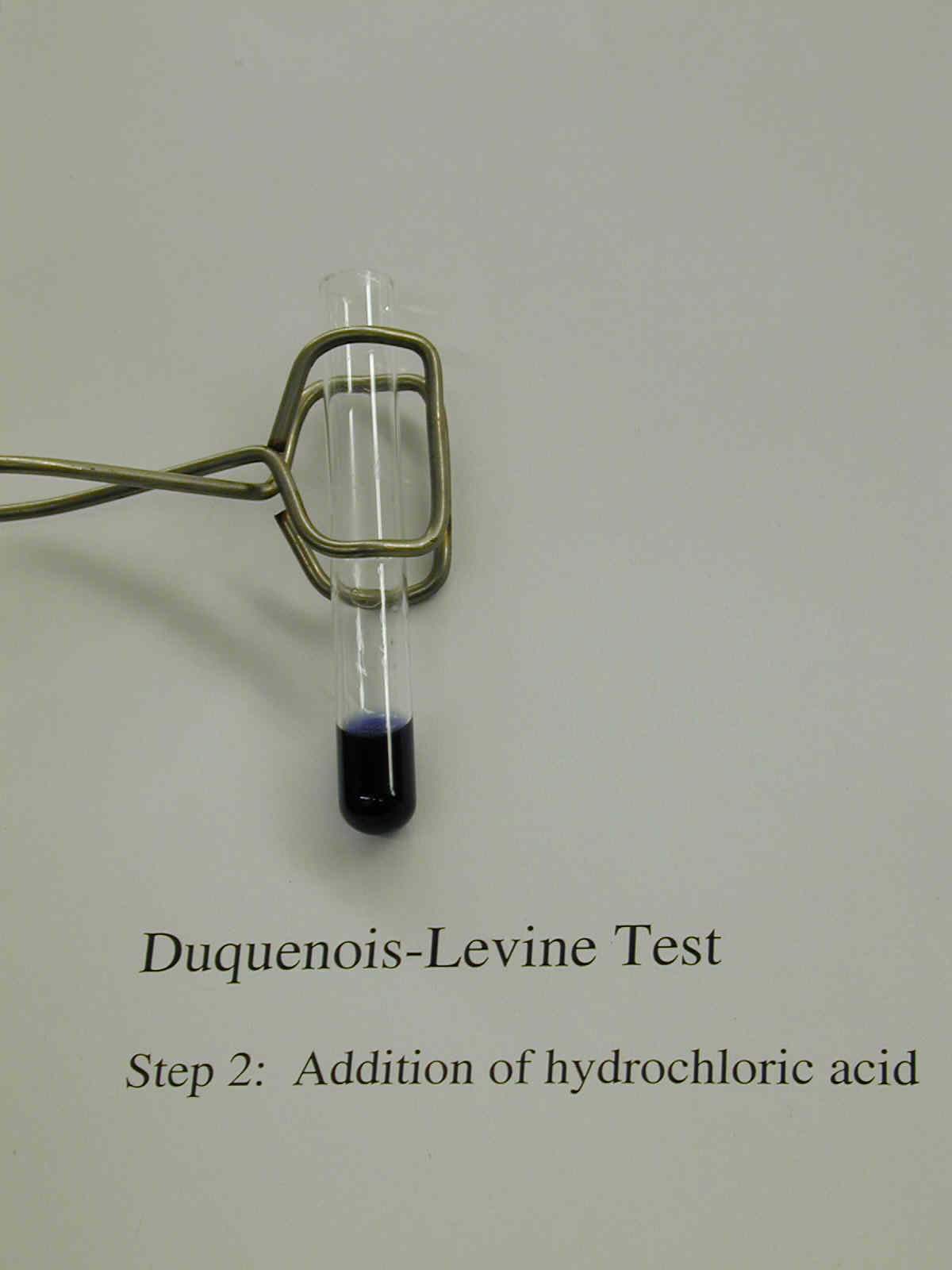
Step 2 – addition of hydrochloric acid

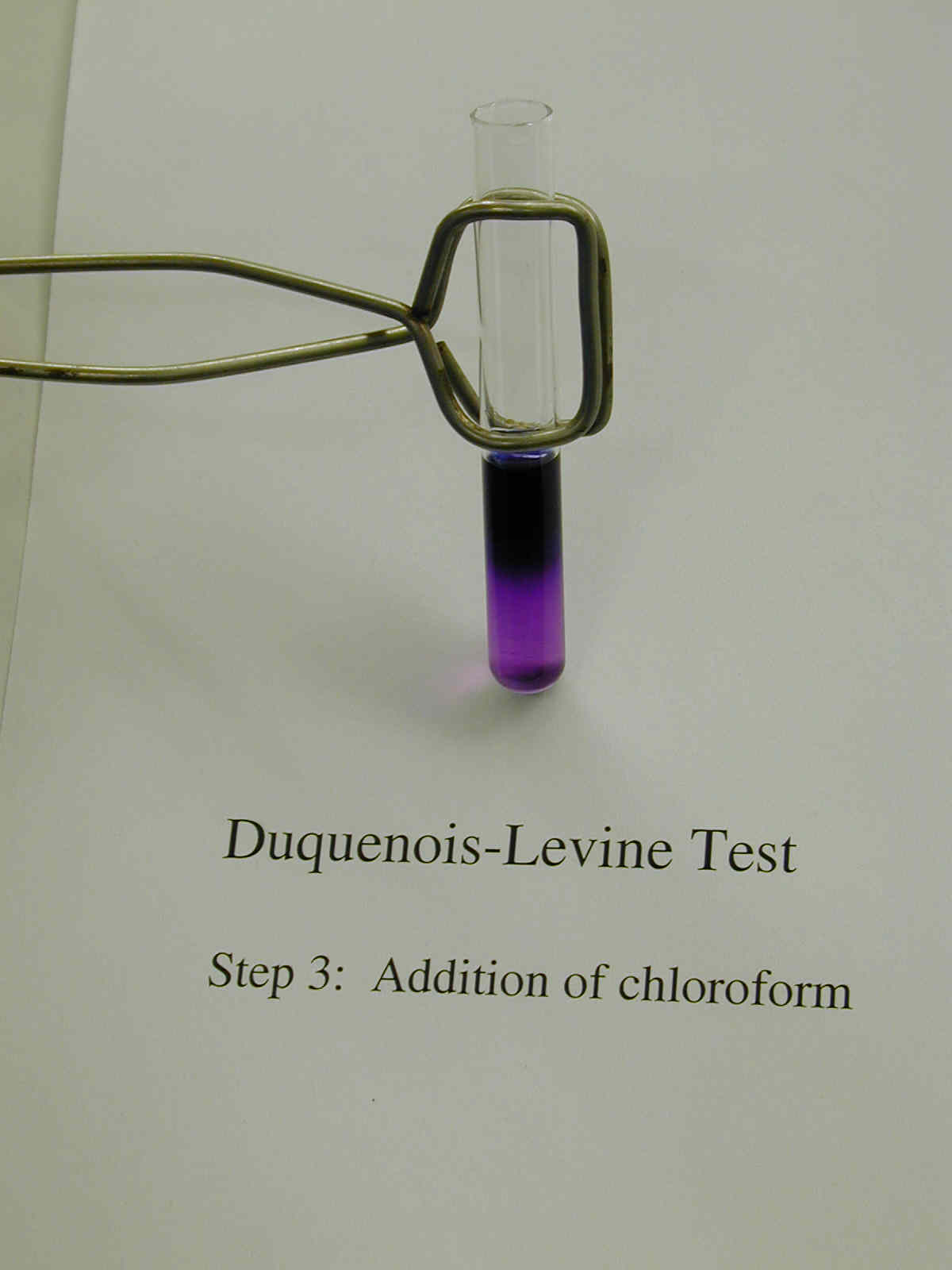
Step 3 – addition of chloroform
