= Cannabis drug testing =

Drug test methodologies for the use of cannabis

Cannabis drug testing describes various drug test methodologies for the use of cannabis in medicine, sport, and law. Cannabis use is highly detectable and can be detected by urinalysis, hair analysis, as well as saliva tests for days or weeks.

Unlike alcohol, for which impairment can be reasonably measured using a breathalyser (and confirmed with a blood alcohol content measurement), valid detection for cannabis is time-consuming, and tests cannot determine an approximate degree of impairment. The lack of suitable tests and agreed-upon intoxication levels is an issue in the legality of cannabis, especially regarding intoxicated driving.

The concentrations obtained from such analyses can often be helpful in distinguishing active use from passive exposure, elapsed time since use, and extent or duration of use.

The Duquenois-Levine test is commonly used as a screening test in the field, but it cannot definitively confirm the presence of cannabis, as a large range of substances have been shown to give false positives.

At-home cannabis testing kits are also available, allowing individuals to check THC levels before employment or compliance screenings. Some brands, such as Exploro, provide THC home tests and confirmatory testing options that measure exact THC metabolite concentrations, helping users understand their status before formal testing.

== Biological timeline ==
Most cannabinoids are lipophilic (fat soluble) compounds that easily store in fat, thus yielding a long elimination half-life relative to other recreational drugs. Metabolites of cannabis are usually detectable in urine drug tests from 3 days up to 10 days according to Redwood Laboratories; heavy users can produce positive tests for 30 days or longer after ceasing cannabis use. The length of time may vary to some degree according to metabolism, quantity, and frequency of use.

== Testing methods ==
=== Urine testing ===
Marijuana use can be detected up to 3–5 days after exposure for infrequent users, 1–15 days for heavy users, and 1–30 days for chronic users and/or users with high body fat.

Under the typical 50 ng/mL cutoff used for cannabis testing in the United States, an occasional or on-off user would be very unlikely to test positive beyond 3–4 days since the last use, and a chronic user would be likely to test positive much beyond 7 days all the way up to 90 days in a urine or hair sample. Cited Health line article medically reviewed by Eloise Theisen RN, MSN, AGPCNOP-BC dated April 23 2024. Using a more sensitive cutoff of 20 ng/mL (less common but still used by some labs), the most likely maximum times are 7 days and 21 days, respectively. In extraordinary circumstances of extended marijuana use, detection times of more than 30 days are possible in some individuals at the 20 ng/mL cutoff.

However, every individual is different, and detection times can vary due to metabolism or other factors. It also depends on whether tetrahydrocannabinol (THC) or its metabolites are being tested for, the latter having a much longer detection time than the former. THC, the main psychoactive component of cannabis, may only be detectable in saliva and oral fluid for 2–24 hours in most cases.

The main metabolite excreted in the urine is 11-Nor-9-carboxy-THC, also known as THC-COOH. Most cannabis drug tests yield a positive result when the concentration of THC-COOH in urine exceeds 50 ng/mL. Urine testing is an immunoassay based test on the principle of competitive binding. Drugs which may be present in the urine specimen compete against their respective drug conjugate for binding sites on their specific antibody. During testing, a urine specimen migrates upward by capillary action. A drug, if present in the urine specimen below its cut-off concentration, will not saturate the binding sites of its specific antibody. The antibody will then react with the drug-protein conjugate and a visible colored line will show up in the test line region of the specific drug strip.

Cannabis use is included in the "10-panel urine screen", as well as the "SAMHSA-5", the five drugs tested for in standard NIDA approved drug tests.

False positives have been known to be triggered by consuming hemp-seed bars, low THC cannabis and CBD supplements, although the more detailed, more expensive gas chromatography-mass spectrometer (GCMS) test can tell the difference.

In 2011, researchers at John Jay College of Criminal Justice reported that dietary zinc supplements can mask the presence of THC and other drugs in urine. Similar claims have been made in web forums on that topic. However, a 2013 study conducted by researchers at the University of Utah School of Medicine refute the possibility of self-administered zinc producing false-negative urine drug tests.

Common known pharmaceutical drugs which cause false positives in instant THC dip tests include:

- Proton pump inhibitors

=== Duquenois–Levine reagent ===
The Duquenois–Levine test is a simple chemical color reaction test initially developed in the 1930s by Pierre Duquénois.

To administer the test, a user simply has to mix the chemicals with a particle of the suspected substance; if the chemicals turn purple, this indicates the possibility of marijuana. But the color variations can be subtle, and readings can vary by examiner.

It was adopted in the 1950s by the United Nations as the preferred test for cannabis. Such tests are often distributed in snap-to-open glass vials.

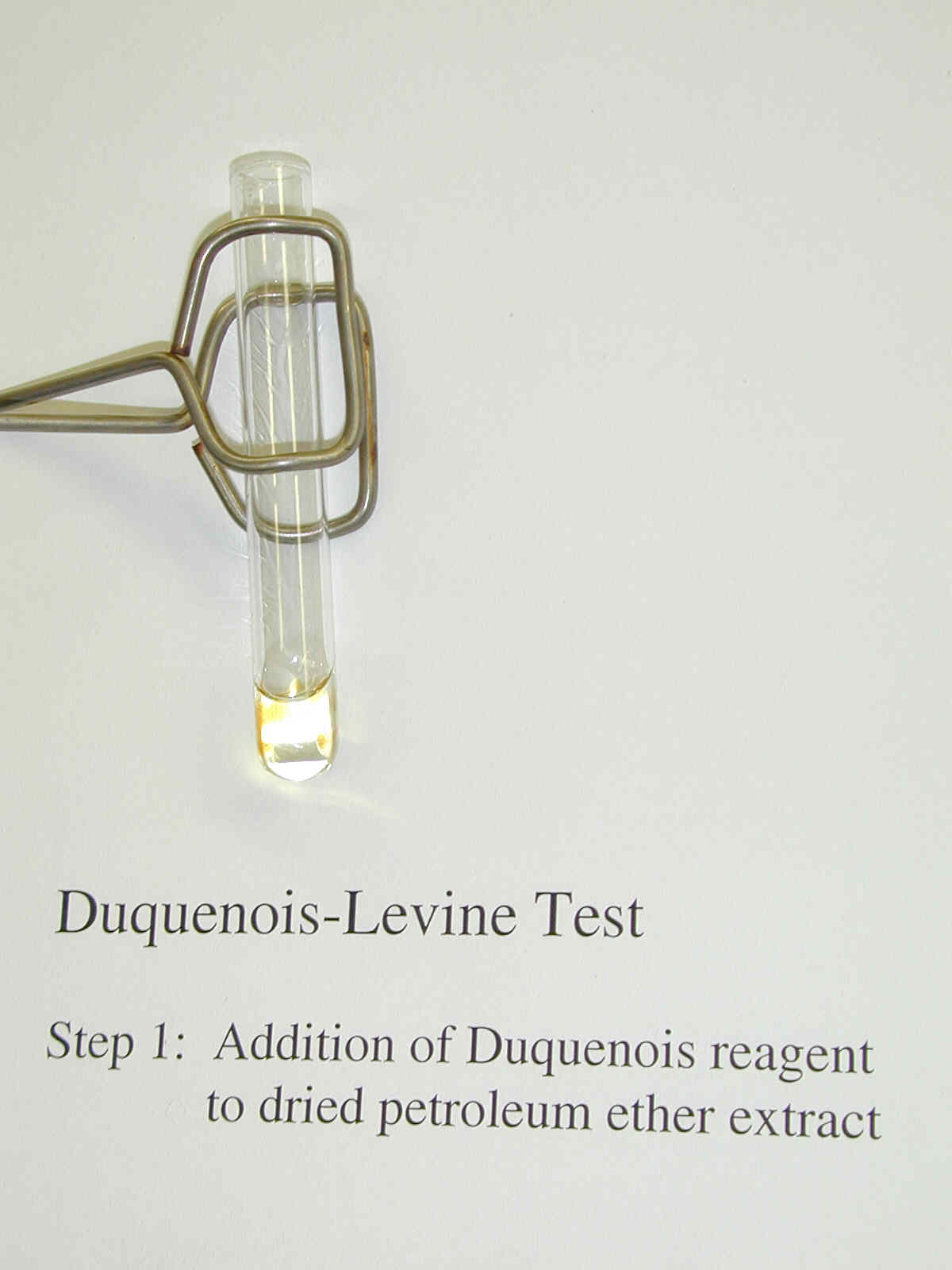
Step 1 – addition of Duquenois reagent to dried petroleum ether extract

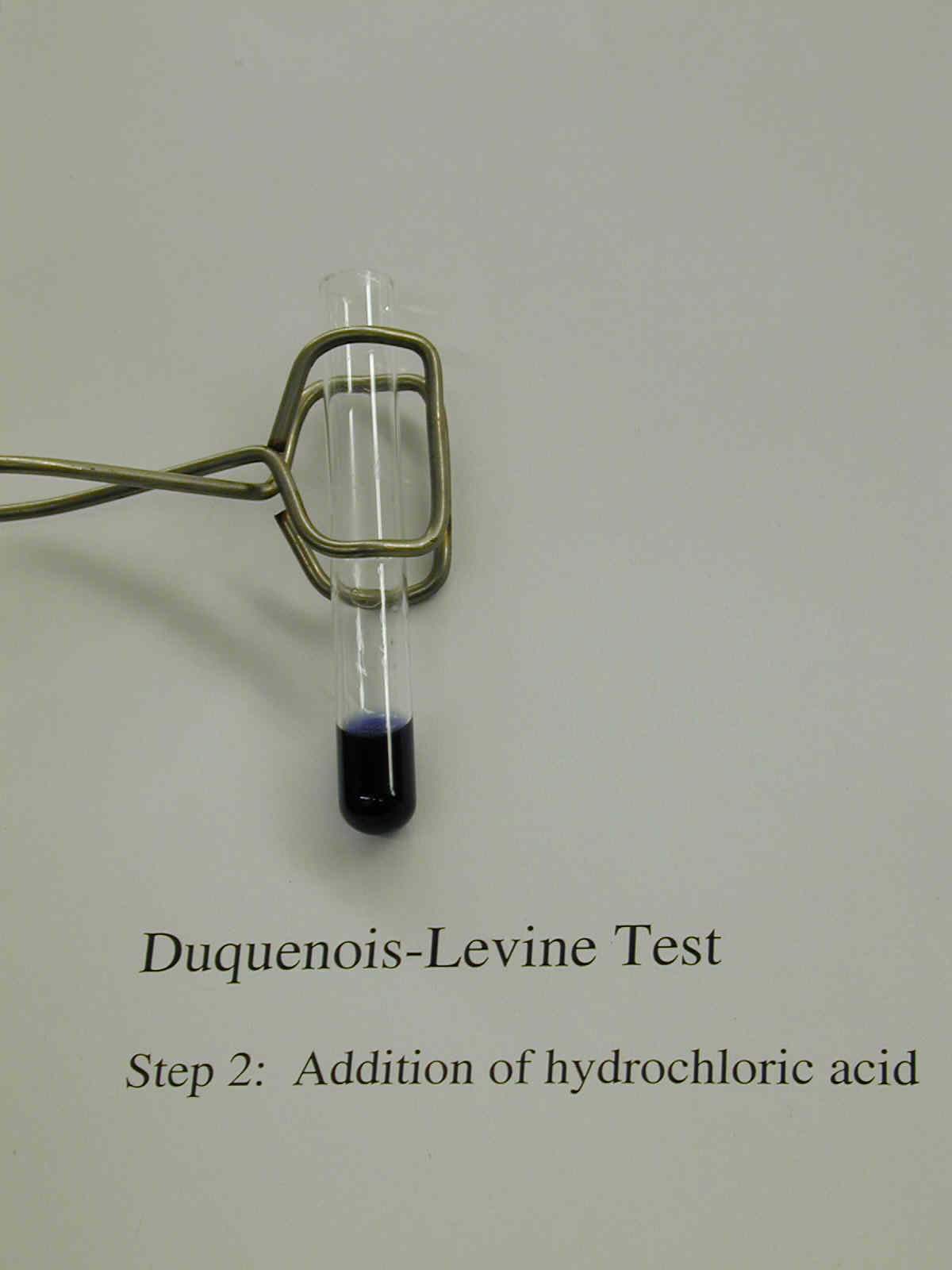
Step 2 – addition of hydrochloric acid

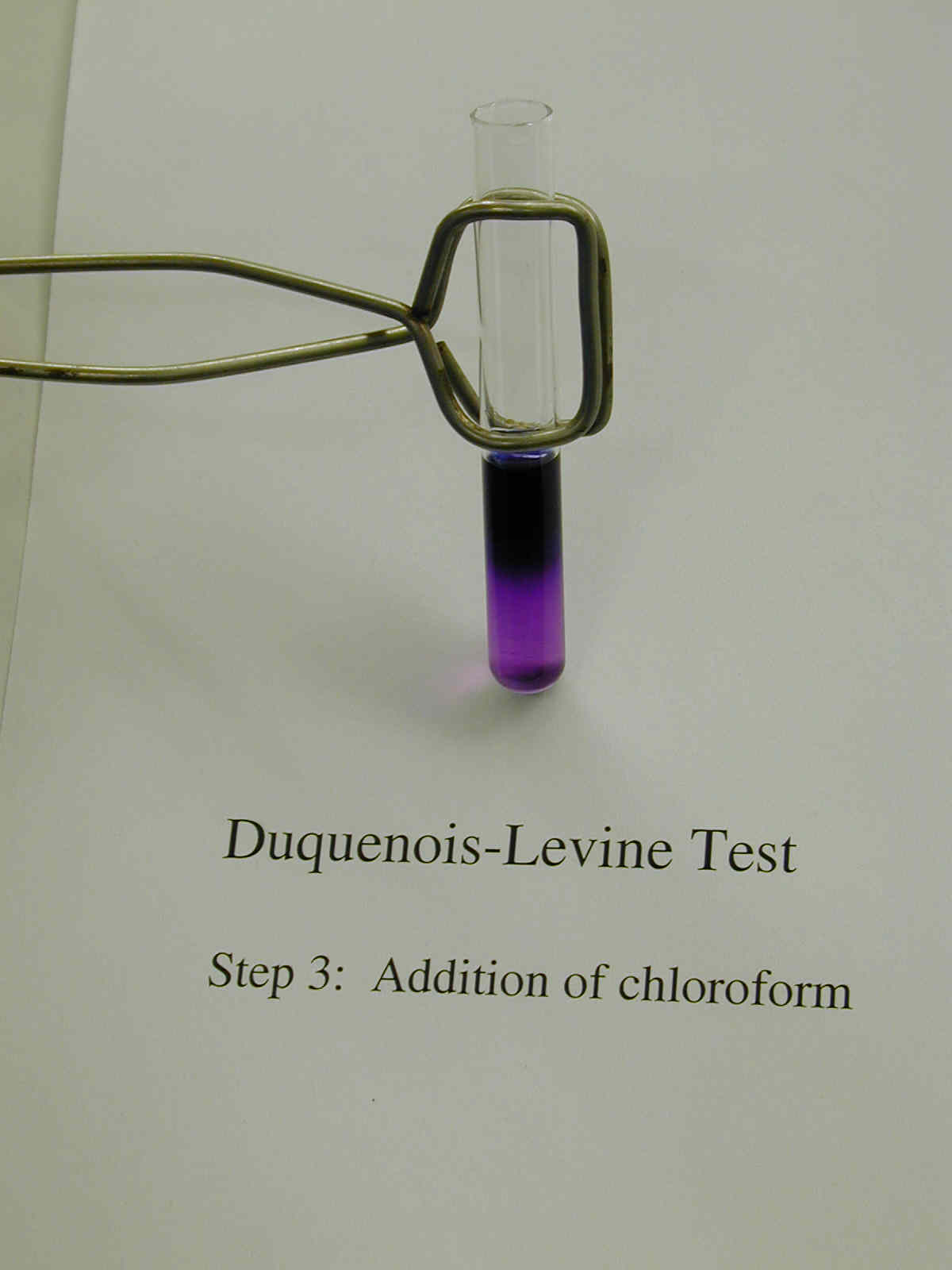
Step 3 – addition of chloroform

=== Azo dyes (Fast Blue B/BB) ===
The United Nations Office on Drugs and Crime (UNODC) found the azo dyes Fast Blue B (3,3'-dimethoxybiphenyl-4,4'-bisdiazonium chloride) and Fast Blue BB (4-benzoylamino-2,5-diethoxybenzenediazonium chloride) superior to Duquenois–Levine, and are currently the most recommended reagents used for cannabinoid testing. The dyes, as water-soluble salts, are typically applied during thin layer chromatography. They are extremely sensitive to a variety of cannabinoids, and very specific in reaction. Fast Blue BB is slightly slower than Fast Blue B, but the resulting colors are more vivid and intense. Due to concerns about Fast Blue B being carcinogenic Fast Blue BB is often used instead, although it too is a suspected carcinogen. Other Azo dyes which are suitable for cannabinoid detection, albeit inferior to Fast Blue B/BB, include Corinth V, Blue LGC, Garnet GC (GR), Red AV, Garnet GBO, Bordeaux GP, and Red P.

=== Beam's CBD Test ===
In 1911, Dr. W. Beam discovered that the tissue of hemp, which is typically low in THC but high in CBD, gives a purple color when treated with bases. The test is relatively simple and inexpensive, and typically involves placing the test sample in a solution of 5% potassium hydroxide and 95% ethanol. After approximately ten minutes, samples with CBD exhibit a violet/purple/pink color. The test is specific to CBD and does not react to THC.

=== Hair testing ===
Cannabis use is detectable with hair tests and is generally included in the standard hair test. Hair tests generally take the most recent 1.5 inches of growth and use those for testing. That provides a detection period of approximately 90 days. If an individual's hair is shorter than 1.5 inches, this detection period will be shorter. The detection window for body hair cannabis testing will be longer, because body hair grows slower than head hair and distorts the detection timeframe. Hair drug testing measures the marijuana parent metabolite embedded inside the hairshaft and eliminates external contamination as a source of a positive result. The detection window of hair drug testing for cannabis can be as low as 1 pg/mg.

=== Saliva testing ===
Cannabis is detectable by saliva testing. Just like blood testing, saliva testing detects the presence of parent drugs and not their inactive metabolites. This results in a shorter window of detection for cannabis by saliva testing. Delta 9 THC is the parent compound. If a saliva sample is tested in a lab, the detection level can be as low as 0.5 ng/mL (up to 72 hours after intake). Per National Institute on Drug Abuse saliva drug testing provides a reasonable alternative to other drug testing methods.

=== Blood testing ===
Cannabis is detectable in the blood for approximately 12–24 hours, Because they are invasive and difficult to administer, blood tests are used less frequently. They are typically used in investigations of accidents, injuries and DUIs.

Urine contains predominantly THC-COOH, while hair, oral fluid, and sweat contain primarily THC. Blood may contain both substances, with the relative amounts dependent on the recency and extent of usage.

=== Neurological testing ===
Although unlikely to be used in court, electroencephalography (EEG) results show somewhat more persistent alpha waves of slightly lower frequency than the norm. Cannabinoids produce a "marked depression of motor activity" via activation of neuronal cannabinoid receptors belonging to the CB1 subtype.
