= Drug-impaired driving =

Driving a motor vehicle while under the influence of an impairing substance

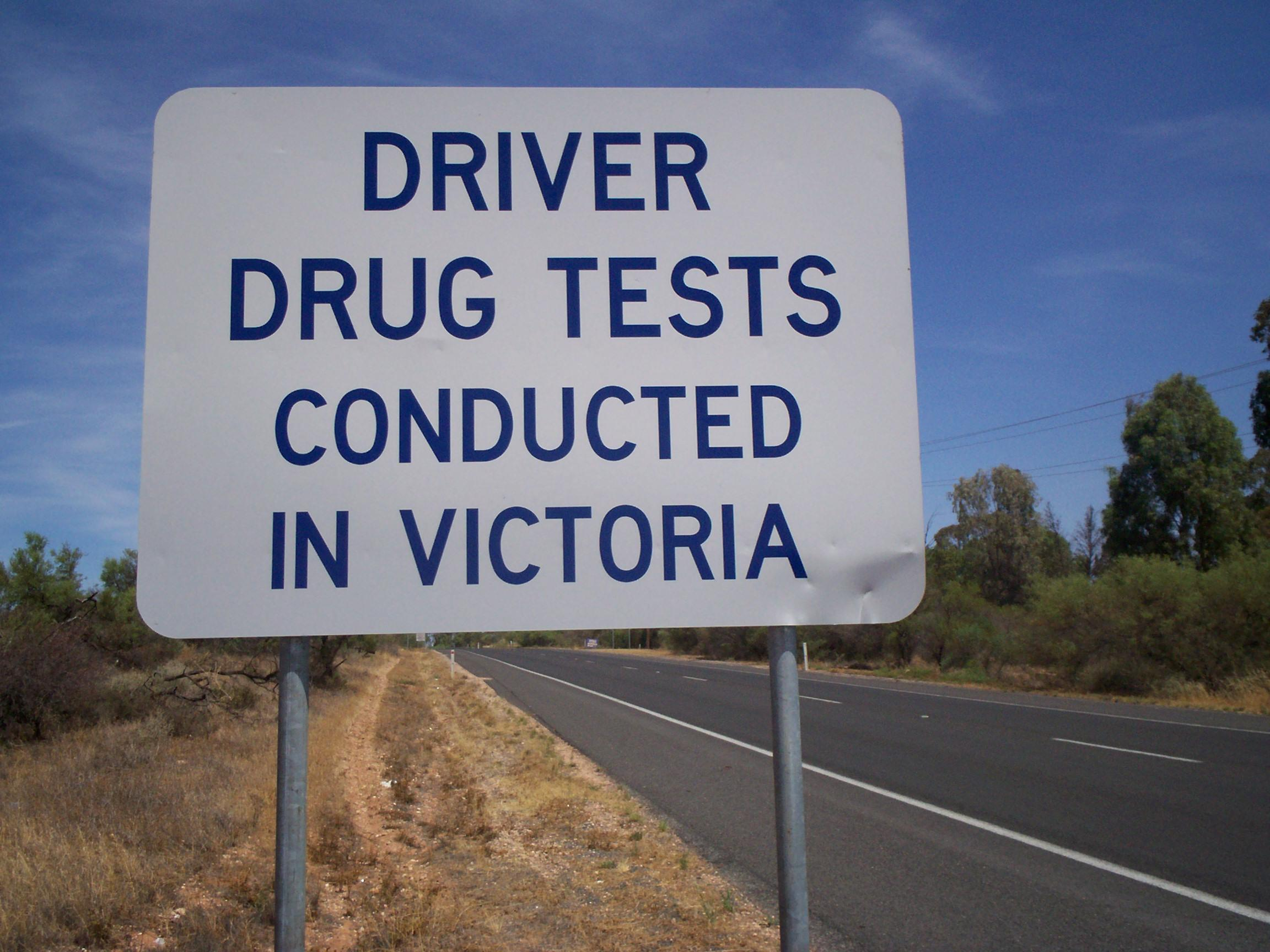
A road sign in Victoria, Australia, warning drivers about drug testing

Drug-impaired driving, commonly known as Driving Under the Influence of Drugs (DUID) or drug driving in the context of its legal definition, is the act of driving a motor vehicle while under the influence of an impairing substance. DUID is prohibited in many countries.

Several European countries and states in the US have "per se" DUID laws that presume a driver is impaired if they are found to have any detectable quantity of controlled substances in their body while operating an automobile and that the driver has no doctor's prescription for the substance. This is similar to the "per se" DUI/DWI laws that presume a driver is impaired when their blood alcohol content is above a certain level (currently 0.08% in most of the United States and 0.05% in Utah). There is some controversy with "per se" DUID laws in that a driver with any detectable quantity of controlled substances may not in fact be impaired and the detectable quantity in blood or sweat may be only the remnants of drug use in days or weeks past.

Drug-impaired driving is against road traffic safety. Research on factors associated with engaging in DUID is receiving increasing attention to develop more effective countermeasures.

== Laws by country ==
=== United States ===
According to the US National Highway Traffic Safety Administration's Drug Evaluation and Classification program (DEC), a drug is "any substance that, when taken into the human body, can impair the ability of the person to operate a vehicle safely." Under this definition, alcohol would be classified as a drug. For the purposes of this article, drug impaired driving is the use of drugs other than alcohol and the effect on driving.

==== Detection ====
Testing for alcohol concentration is performed using three methods – blood, breath, or urine. For law enforcement purposes, breath is the preferred method, since results are available almost instantaneously. Drug testing screens are typically performed in scientific laboratories so that the results will be admissible in evidence at trial.

Due to the overwhelming number of impairing substances that are not alcohol, drugs are classified into different categories for detection purposes. Drug impaired drivers still show impairment during the battery of standardized field sobriety tests, but there are additional tests to help detect drug impaired driving.

The Drug Evaluation and Classification program is designed to detect a drug impaired driver and classify the categories of drugs present in their system.

The DEC program breaks down detection into a 12-step process that a government-certified Drug Recognition Expert (DRE) can use to determine the category or categories of drugs that a suspect is impaired by. The 12 steps are:

1. Breath Alcohol Test
2. Interview with Arresting Officer
3. Preliminary Evaluation
4. Evaluation of the Eyes
5. Psychomotor Tests
6. Vital Signs
7. Dark Room Examinations
8. Muscle Tone
9. Injection Sites
10. Interrogation of Suspect
11. Opinion of the Evaluator
12. Toxicological Examination

DREs are qualified to offer expert testimony in court that pertains to impaired driving on drugs. The use of the 12-step process is scientifically validated by numerous field studies.

==== Drug categories ====
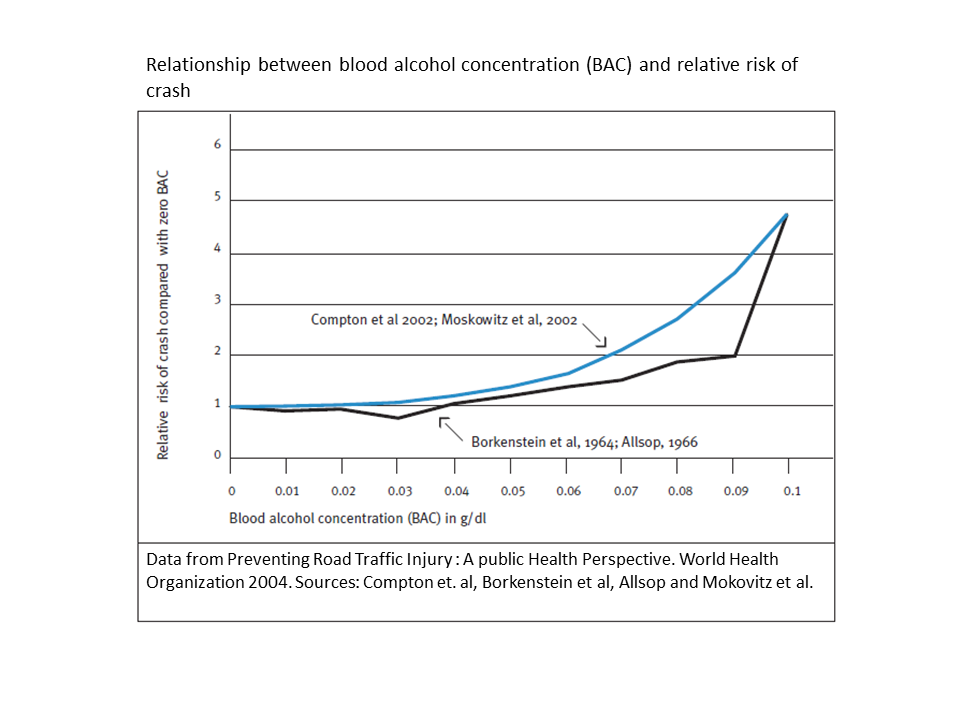
Relative risk of a crash based on blood alcohol levels

The DEC program recognizes seven separate categories of impairing drugs:

- CNS depressants – Drugs such as alcohol, barbiturates, and benzodiazepines fit in this category
- CNS stimulants – Drugs such as cocaine and amphetamines fit in this category
- Hallucinogens – Drugs such as LSD, peyote, and MDMA fit in this category
- Dissociative anesthetics – drugs such as PCP and Ketamine fit in this category
- Narcotic analgesics – synthetic and derivative opioids fit in this category
- Inhalants – volatile solvents, anesthetic gases and aerosol sprays fit in this category
- Cannabis – marijuana fits in this category, as does its active component THC

==== Laws ====
In the United States, 19 states have laws in effect that punish drug impaired driving. All states excluding West Virginia have a Drug Recognition Expert program. The following states have drug statutes enacted:

Alaska – Statute 28.35.030 – "(a) A person commits the crime of driving while under the influence of an alcoholic beverage, inhalant, or controlled substance if the person operates or drives a motor vehicle or operates an aircraft or a watercraft while under the influence of an alcoholic beverage, intoxicating liquor, inhalant, or any controlled substance, singly or in combination"

Arizona – "A. It is unlawful for a person to drive or be in actual physical control of a vehicle in this state under any of the following circumstances: 1. While under the influence of intoxicating liquor, any drug, a vapor releasing substance containing a toxic substance or any combination of liquor, drugs or vapor releasing substances if the person is impaired to the slightest degree."

Colorado – Statute 42-4-1301 – Colorado law prohibits a person from driving a vehicle while under the influence of alcohol or drugs or while the person's ability to drive is impaired by alcohol or drugs. Section IV states "If at such time the driver's blood contained five nanograms or more of delta 9-tetrahydrocannabinol per milliliter in whole blood, as shown by analysis of the defendant's blood, such fact gives rise to a permissible inference that the defendant was under the influence of one or more drugs." DUI-D cases often involve these two police tools: (1) a voluntary Drug Recognition Evaluation (DRE) which is similar to a field sobriety test and allows police officers to draw conclusions about a drivers impairment, and (2) a blood test to screen and confirm traces of drug use in a defendant's system.

Delaware – "In Delaware, you may be arrested for Driving Under the Influence (DUI) if you are driving, operating, or in actual physical control of a vehicle, an off-highway vehicle, or a moped while under the influence of alcohol or other drugs.

A chemical test indicating .08% blood alcohol concentration (BAC) or greater, or the presence of any drug, prescription or illegal, substance is sufficient for a DUI conviction. You may be arrested for DUI with a chemical test greater than .05%"

Georgia - (a) A person shall not drive or be in actual physical control of any moving vehicle while:

- Under the influence of alcohol to the extent that it is less safe for the person to drive;
- Under the influence of any drug to the extent that it is less safe for the person to drive;
- Under the intentional influence of any glue, aerosol, or other toxic vapor to the extent that it is less safe for the person to drive;
- Under the combined influence of any two or more of the substances specified in paragraphs 1 through 3 of this subsection to the extent that it is less safe for the person to drive"

Illinois – "A person shall not drive or be in actual physical control of any vehicle within this State while:

- the alcohol concentration in the person's blood or breath is 0.08 or more based on the definition of blood and breath units in Section 11 501.2;
- under the influence of alcohol;
- under the influence of any intoxicating compound or combination of intoxicating compounds to a degree that renders the person incapable of driving safely;
- under the influence of any other drug or combination of drugs to a degree that renders the person incapable of safely driving;
- under the combined influence of alcohol, other drug or drugs, or intoxicating compound or compounds to a degree that renders the person incapable of safely driving"

Indiana – An operator of a motor vehicle whose alcohol concentration is greater than or equal to .08 grams and less than .15 grams of alcohol per 100 milliliters of blood or 210 liters of breath commits a Class C Misdemeanor. Driving with any schedule I or II substance as defined by IC 25-48-2 (such as marijuana, methamphetamine or cocaine) or its metabolite in his/her body commits a Class C Misdemeanor, punishable by up to 60 days in prison and up to a $500 fine. (IC 9-30-5-1)"

Iowa – "Iowa's OWI law states that it is unlawful to operate a motor vehicle in Iowa:

- While under the influence of an alcoholic beverage or other drug or a combination of such substances.
- While having an alcohol concentration of .08 or more.
- While having any amount of a controlled substance in one's body."

Michigan - Under Michigan law, it is illegal to drive:

- While intoxicated, or impaired, by alcohol, illegal drugs, and some prescribed medications.
- With a bodily alcohol content of 0.08 or more. (This crime is one of the driving while intoxicated offenses.)
- With a bodily alcohol content of 0.17 or more. (This "High BAC" crime is one of the driving while intoxicated offenses.)
- With any amount of cocaine or a Schedule 1 controlled substance in your body. (For more information about Schedule 1 drugs, see section 7212 of the Michigan Public Health Code; MCL 333.7212.)"

Minnesota – "1) to drive, operate, or be in control of any motor vehicle anywhere in the state while:

- under the influence of alcohol, a controlled substance, or (knowingly) a hazardous substance, or any combination of these;
- having an alcohol concentration (AC) of .08 (.08 means .08 percent alcohol concentration, which is 8/10,000ths by volume) or more at the time or within two hours of doing so;
- having any amount or the metabolites of a schedule I or II controlled substance, other than marijuana, in the body"

Mississippi – "(1) It is unlawful for any person to drive or otherwise operate a vehicle within this state who (a) is under the influence of intoxicating liquor; (b) is under the influence of any other substance which has impaired such person's ability to operate a motor vehicle; (c) has an alcohol concentration of eight one-hundredths percent (.08%) or more for persons who are above the legal age to purchase alcoholic beverages under state law, or two one-hundredths percent (.02%) or more for persons who are below the legal age to purchase alcoholic beverages under state law, in the person's blood based upon grams of alcohol per one hundred (100) milliliters of blood or grams of alcohol per two hundred ten (210) liters of breath as shown by a chemical analysis of such person's breath, blood or urine administered as authorized by this chapter; (d) is under the influence of any drug or controlled substance, the possession of which is unlawful under the Mississippi Controlled Substances Law; or (e) has an alcohol concentration of four one-hundredths percent (.04%) or more in the person's blood, based upon grams of alcohol per one hundred (100) milliliters of blood or grams of alcohol per two hundred ten (210) liters of breath as shown by a chemical analysis of such person's blood, breath or urine, administered as authorized by this chapter for persons operating a commercial motor vehicle."

Nevada – "1. It is unlawful for any person who:

- Is under the influence of intoxicating liquor;
- Has a concentration of alcohol of 0.08 or more in their blood or breath; or
- Is found by measurement within 2 hours after driving or being in actual physical control of a vehicle to have a concentration of alcohol of 0.08 or more in their blood or breath, to drive or be in actual physical control of a vehicle on a highway or on premises to which the public has access.

2. It is unlawful for any person who:

- Is under the influence of a controlled substance;
- Is under the combined influence of intoxicating liquor and a controlled substance; or
- Inhales, ingests, applies or otherwise uses any chemical, poison or organic solvent, or any compound or combination of any of these, to a degree which renders the person incapable of safely driving or exercising actual physical control of a vehicle, to drive or be in actual physical control of a vehicle on a highway or on premises to which the public has access. The fact that any person charged with a violation of this subsection is or has been entitled to use that drug under the laws of this State is not a defense against any charge of violating this subsection.

3. It is unlawful for any person to drive or be in actual physical control of a vehicle on a highway or on premises to which the public has access with an amount of a prohibited substance in their blood or urine that is equal to or greater than:

Prohibited substance	Urine (ng/ml)	Blood (ng/ml)
(a) Amphetamine	500	100
(b) Cocaine	150	50
(c) Cocaine metabolite	150	50
(d) Heroin	2000	50
(e) Heroin metabolite (1) Morphine (2) 6-monoacetyl morphine	2000	50
(e) Heroin metabolite (1) Morphine (2) 6-monoacetyl morphine	10	10
(f) Lysergic acid diethylamide	25	2
(g) Marijuana	10	2
(h) Marijuana metabolite	15	5
(i) Methamphetamine	500	100
(j) Phencyclidine	25	10

- 4. If consumption is proven by a preponderance of the evidence, it is an affirmative defense under paragraph c of subsection 1 that the defendant consumed a sufficient quantity of alcohol after driving or being in actual physical control of the vehicle, and before their blood or breath was tested, to cause the defendant to have a concentration of alcohol of 0.08 or more in their blood or breath. A defendant who intends to offer this defense at a trial or preliminary hearing must, not less than 14 days before the trial or hearing or at such other time as the court may direct, file and serve on the prosecuting attorney a written notice of that intent."

North Carolina – "(a) Offense. – A person commits the offense of impaired driving if he drives any vehicle upon any highway, any street, or any public vehicular area within this State:

- While under the influence of an impairing substance; or
1. After having consumed sufficient alcohol that he has, at any relevant time after the driving, an alcohol concentration of 0.08 or more. The results of a chemical analysis shall be deemed sufficient evidence to prove a person's alcohol concentration; or
- With any amount of a Schedule I controlled substance, as listed in G.S. 90 89, or its metabolites in his blood or urine."

Ohio – "(A)(1) No person shall operate any vehicle, streetcar, or trackless trolley within this state, if, at the time of the operation, any of the following apply:

- The person is under the influence of alcohol, a drug of abuse, or a combination of them.
- The person has a concentration of eight-hundredths of one per cent or more but less than seventeen-hundredths of one per cent by weight per unit volume of alcohol in the person's whole blood.
- The person has a concentration of ninety-six-thousandths of one per cent or more but less than two hundred four-thousandths of one per cent by weight per unit volume of alcohol in the person's blood serum or plasma.
- The person has a concentration of eight-hundredths of one gram or more but less than seventeen-hundredths of one gram by weight of alcohol per two hundred ten liters of the person's breath.
- The person has a concentration of eleven-hundredths of one gram or more but less than two hundred thirty-eight-thousandths of one gram by weight of alcohol per one hundred milliliters of the person's urine.
- The person has a concentration of seventeen-hundredths of one per cent or more by weight per unit volume of alcohol in the person's whole blood.
- The person has a concentration of two hundred four-thousandths of one per cent or more by weight per unit volume of alcohol in the person's blood serum or plasma.
- The person has a concentration of seventeen-hundredths of one gram or more by weight of alcohol per two hundred ten liters of the person's breath.
- The person has a concentration of two hundred thirty-eight-thousandths of one gram or more by weight of alcohol per one hundred milliliters of the person's urine.
- Except as provided in division (K) of this section, the person has a concentration of any of the following controlled substances or metabolites of a controlled substance in the person's whole blood, blood serum or plasma, or urine that equals or exceeds any of the following:
  - The person has a concentration of amphetamine in the person's urine of at least five hundred nanograms of amphetamine per milliliter of the person's urine or has a concentration of amphetamine in the person's whole blood or blood serum or plasma of at least one hundred nanograms of amphetamine per milliliter of the person's whole blood or blood serum or plasma.
  - The person has a concentration of cocaine in the person's urine of at least one hundred fifty nanograms of cocaine per milliliter of the person's urine or has a concentration of cocaine in the person's whole blood or blood serum or plasma of at least fifty nanograms of cocaine per milliliter of the person's whole blood or blood serum or plasma.
  - The person has a concentration of cocaine metabolite in the person's urine of at least one hundred fifty nanograms of cocaine metabolite per milliliter of the person's urine or has a concentration of cocaine metabolite in the person's whole blood or blood serum or plasma of at least fifty nanograms of cocaine metabolite per milliliter of the person's whole blood or blood serum or plasma.
  - The person has a concentration of heroin in the person's urine of at least two thousand nanograms of heroin per milliliter of the person's urine or has a concentration of heroin in the person's whole blood or blood serum or plasma of at least fifty nanograms of heroin per milliliter of the person's whole blood or blood serum or plasma.
  - The person has a concentration of heroin metabolite (6-monoacetyl morphine) in the person's urine of at least ten nanograms of heroin metabolite (6-monoacetyl morphine) per milliliter of the person's urine or has a concentration of heroin metabolite (6-monoacetyl morphine) in the person's whole blood or blood serum or plasma of at least ten nanograms of heroin metabolite (6-monoacetyl morphine) per milliliter of the person's whole blood or blood serum or plasma.

(vi) The person has a concentration of L.S.D. in the person's urine of at least twenty-five nanograms of L.S.D. per milliliter of the person's urine or a concentration of L.S.D. in the person's whole blood or blood serum or plasma of at least ten nanograms of L.S.D. per milliliter of the person's whole blood or blood serum or plasma. (vii) The person has a concentration of marihuana in the person's urine of at least ten nanograms of marihuana per milliliter of the person's urine or has a concentration of marihuana in the person's whole blood or blood serum or plasma of at least two nanograms of marihuana per milliliter of the person's whole blood or blood serum or plasma."

Pennsylvania – "(d) Controlled substances.--An individual may not drive, operate or be in actual physical control of the movement of a vehicle under any of the following circumstances:

- There is in the individual's blood any amount of a:
  - Schedule I controlled substance, as defined in the act of April 14, 1972 (P.L.233, No.64), known as The Controlled Substance, Drug, Device and Cosmetic Act;
  - Schedule II or Schedule III controlled substance, as defined in The Controlled Substance, Drug, Device and Cosmetic Act, which has not been medically prescribed for the individual; or
  - metabolite of a substance under subparagraph (i) or (ii).
- The individual is under the influence of a drug or combination of drugs to a degree which impairs the individual's ability to safely drive, operate or be in actual physical control of the movement of the vehicle.
- The individual is under the combined influence of alcohol and a drug or combination of drugs to a degree which impairs the individual's ability to safely drive, operate or be in actual physical control of the movement of the vehicle.
- The individual is under the influence of a solvent or noxious substance in violation of 18 Pa.C.S. § 7303 (relating to sale or illegal use of certain solvents and noxious substances)."

Rhode Island – "§ 31-27-2 Driving under influence of liquor or drugs. – (a) Whoever drives or otherwise operates any vehicle in the state while under the influence of any intoxicating liquor, drugs, toluene, or any controlled substance as defined in chapter 28 of title 21, or any combination of these, shall be guilty of a misdemeanor except as provided in subdivision (d)(3) and shall be punished as provided in subsection (d) of this section.

B. Any person charged under subsection (a) of this section whose blood alcohol concentration is eight one-hundredths of one percent (.08%) or more by weight as shown by a chemical analysis of a blood, breath, or urine sample shall be guilty of violating subsection (a) of this section. This provision shall not preclude a conviction based on other admissible evidence. Proof of guilt under this section may also be based on evidence that the person charged was under the influence of intoxicating liquor, drugs, toluene, or any controlled substance defined in chapter 28 of title 21, or any combination of these, to a degree which rendered the person incapable of safely operating a vehicle. The fact that any person charged with violating this section is or has been legally entitled to use alcohol or a drug shall not constitute a defense against any charge of violating this section."

Some Rhode Island police agencies utilize Drug Recognition Experts (DREs) who have received specialized training to accurately identify drug impairment, pursuant to a standardized procedure. A study showed DRE officers to accurately identify a substance used by a driver 86.5 percent of the time. Their testimony remains subject to court challenge, including impeachment through the results of toxicological testing.

South Carolina – "(A) It is unlawful for a person to drive a motor vehicle within this State while under the influence of alcohol to the extent that the person's faculties to drive a motor vehicle are materially and appreciably impaired, under the influence of any other drug or a combination of other drugs or substances which cause impairment to the extent that the person's faculties to drive a motor vehicle are materially and appreciably impaired, or under the combined influence of alcohol and any other drug or drugs or substances which cause impairment to the extent that the person's faculties to drive a motor vehicle are materially and appreciably impaired. A person who violates the provisions of this section is guilty of the offense of driving under the influence and, upon conviction, entry of a plea of guilty or of nolo contendere, or forfeiture of bail must be punished as follows:"

Utah – "1. A person may not operate or be in actual physical control of a vehicle within this state if the person:

- has sufficient alcohol in the person's body that a subsequent chemical test shows that the person has a blood or breath alcohol concentration of .05 grams or greater at the time of the test;
- is under the influence of alcohol, any drug, or the combined influence of alcohol and any drug to a degree that renders the person incapable of safely operating a vehicle; or
- has a blood or breath alcohol concentration of .08 grams or greater at the time of operation or actual physical control.
- 2. Alcohol concentration in the blood shall be based upon grams of alcohol per 100 milliliters of blood, and alcohol concentration in the breath shall be based upon grams of alcohol per 210 liters of breath."

Virginia – "It shall be unlawful for any person to drive or operate any motor vehicle, engine or train (i) while such person has a blood alcohol concentration of 0.08 percent or more by weight by volume or 0.08 grams or more per 210 liters of breath as indicated by a chemical test administered as provided in this article, (ii) while such person is under the influence of alcohol, (iii) while such person is under the influence of any narcotic drug or any other self-administered intoxicant or drug of whatsoever nature, or any combination of such drugs, to a degree which impairs his ability to drive or operate any motor vehicle, engine or train safely, (iv) while such person is under the combined influence of alcohol and any drug or drugs to a degree which impairs his ability to drive or operate any motor vehicle, engine or train safely, or (v) while such person has a blood concentration of any of the following substances at a level that is equal to or greater than: (a) 0.02 milligrams of cocaine per liter of blood, (b) 0.1 milligrams of methamphetamine per liter of blood, (c) 0.01 milligrams of phencyclidine per liter of blood, or (d) 0.1 milligrams of 3,4-methylenedioxymethamphetamine per liter of blood. A charge alleging a violation of this section shall support a conviction under clauses (i), (ii), (iii), (iv), or (v)."

Washington - Driving with a blood level of THC in excess of 5 nanograms can result in a DUI conviction.

Wisconsin – "It is illegal in Wisconsin for a driver over the age of 21 to operate a motor vehicle:

- With a Blood/Breath Alcohol Concentration (BAC) of 0.08 or greater;
- While under the influence of an intoxicant;
- With a detectable amount of a restricted controlled substance in their blood; or
- While under the influence of a controlled substance or any other drug."

=== Canada ===
==== Criminal Code Offences ====
In Canada, it is an offence under the federal Criminal Code to drive a motor vehicle if one's ability to drive is impaired by a drug. This is the same offence as driving while impaired by alcohol and carries the same penalties as alcohol-impaired driving.

A charge of impaired driving can be tried either summarily or by indictment. The Crown prosecutor can elect which method to proceed under, based on the seriousness of the offence, but if harm has occurred to another person, the charge must proceed by indictment.

==== Summary Proceedings ====
If a charge is tried summarily, the accused faces the following sentences if convicted:

- for a first offence, a minimum fine of $1,000, with the possibility of a term of imprisonment up to a maximum of 18 months;
- for a second offence, a fine of up to $5,000, and a minimum term of imprisonment of 30 days, up to a maximum of 18 months;
- for a third offence, a fine of up to $5,000 and a minimum term of imprisonment of 120 days, up to a maximum of 18 months.

==== Indictable Proceedings ====
If a charge is tried by indictment, the penalties upon conviction are more severe:

- if no harm has occurred to another person, potential imprisonment up to a maximum of 5 years;
- if bodily harm to another person has been caused the impaired driving, potential imprisonment up to a maximum of 10 years;
- if a death has been caused by the impaired driving, potential life imprisonment, with the possibility of parole after 7 years.

==== Samples of bodily fluids ====
If the police have reasonable grounds to believe that a motorist's ability to drive is impaired by a drug, they can make a demand for samples of oral fluids, urine or blood for analysis. If the motorist refuses to provide the sample, it is an offence, and carries exactly the same potential penalties as the offence of impaired driving.

==== Driving prohibitions and licence suspensions ====
Upon a conviction for drug-impaired driving, there is in all cases a mandatory driving prohibition as part of the sentence under the Criminal Code:

- for a first offence, a minimum prohibition of 1 year, up to a maximum of 3 years;
- for a second offence, a minimum prohibition of 2 years, up to a maximum of 5 years;
- for a subsequent offence, a minimum prohibition of at least 3 years.

In all cases, these periods of prohibition are in addition to the time for which the accused is sentenced to imprisonment.

In addition to the driving prohibitions as part of the sentence for the criminal offence, the provinces can impose licence suspensions under provincial law.

=== European Union ===
Drug impaired driving is today suspected by the European Road Safety Observatory of being the reason that drink driving crash rates no longer reduce in direct proportion to reducing or plateaued numbers of drunk drivers found on roads. It is believed that the remaining ones are carrying more risk than their blood alcohol levels should strictly impart - due to the frequent addition of other drugs. If the historic assumptions about formulae to setting alcohol limits at particular levels to reduce harm (by anticipated degrees) in the target demographic are defunct, the implications for impaired driving reduction policy are major.

=== Ireland ===
In Ireland, it is illegal to drive a motor vehicle if one's ability to drive is impaired by a drug. This is the same offence as driving while impaired by alcohol and carries less penalties than alcohol-impaired driving despite being just as dangerous.

As of 2014, the Road Safety Authority conducts roadside impairment testing of those who are believed to be under the influence of drugs such as cannabis, cocaine and many others.

=== United Kingdom ===
UK legislation effective 2 March 2015 has introduced a series of new offences into the realm of road traffic law.

=== Hong Kong ===
Deterring drug-driving is one of the work priorities of the Police. The Court may disqualify the driver for life.

Driving under the influence of drugs "to an extent as to be incapable of having proper control" is illegal. The Police may require suspects to undergo an objective (at the police station) Impairment Test. Suspects who fail the test shall surrender their driving licence for 24 hours.

Regarding common drugs, the Road Safety Council reminds drivers to check the side effects before driving. The law prohibits driving with any concentration of illicit drugs: heroin, cocaine, ketamine, methamphetamine, cannabis and MDMA.

=== New Zealand ===
The Land Transport Act 1998 makes it illegal for New Zealanders to drive or attempt to drive "while impaired and their blood contains evidence of use of qualifying drug". The definition of impaired is defined as being under the influence "to such an extent as to be incapable of having proper control of the vehicle".

'Qualifying drugs' include Class A drugs such as heroin, LSD and methamphetamine; Class B drugs such as amphetamines (speed), morphine and opium; and some Class C drugs, such as cannabis and BZP (the psychoactive ingredient in most illegal "party pills"); prescription medicines.

== Criticism ==
This controversy is reduced by reducing the potential for wrongful convictions in two ways; firstly, if blood tests are used to obtain convictions, most legal frameworks outside the United States require corroborating evidence of impairment to support that the blood test result represents impairment. This ranges from suspects being required to undertake physical co-ordination tests, to computerised pupil reaction tests, to use of witness accounts of general behaviour and erratic driving, and may include expert testimony as to expected impacts on performance.

Secondly, when saliva tests are used (Australia), a cut off threshold is calibrated in fitting with U.S. Substance Abuse and Mental Health Services Administration standards, at such a level that countries other than the United States have erroneously assumed that the average person would be impaired by the drug detected to a degree that crash risk is significantly raised. The original levels stated by SAMHSA were determined and established simply to detect any drug use; these data were promulgated for testing for individuals in sensitive employment positions regarding public safety and/or national security. Studies have shown that this use can be as long as weeks in the past.

In Germany where more economical sweat tests are used, it is not possible to calibrate detection to a level linked to impairment, and all users may be identified. So unless there has been injury caused there is no criminal charge, but only an administrative one of driving with drugs present, which does not infer impairment or lack of it. This is similar to a speeding ticket as a disincentive for potentially risky behaviour. However if injury was caused, a process of further evidence gathering of driver impairment may be triggered, which can lead to a criminal violation.

== Enforcement ==
Varying DUID laws have been passed in response to both increasing roles of drug driving in road tolls, and the fact prosecutors have found it difficult to prove that a driver was impaired from using a controlled substance. Practical difficulties included the transient effects of some drugs wearing off before either police or doctors had a chance to assess many suspects for impairment, and also the expense of having to call expert forensic witnesses before courts to interpret results on a case by case basis. These laws can make their cases easier to win if they only have to prove the presence of a controlled substance in the blood or urine, without a prescription. The logic in zero tolerance jurisdictions is that the trade off of more efficient prosecutions of potentially impaired individuals is well worth the possible erroneous convictions of a lesser number of drivers who may not in fact be impaired, because the driver was already violating the law by using a controlled substance without a prescription.

There is a tension with such an approach and enhanced road safety. Promoting zero drug use, as with alcohol prohibition, is not a realistic goal and Policing and Court resources are best targeted at hazardous use. The most successful laws for reducing drink driving have sought to modify cultural norms and the target group's behaviour, separating impairment and driving. An approach that appears to be working most successfully to reduce drug driving, based on the Australian experience of matching public health guidelines, such as no driving for approximately 3 hours after cannabis use, with targeted legal intervention (the saliva test drug detection threshold).
