= Athlete activism =

Activism performed by sportspeople

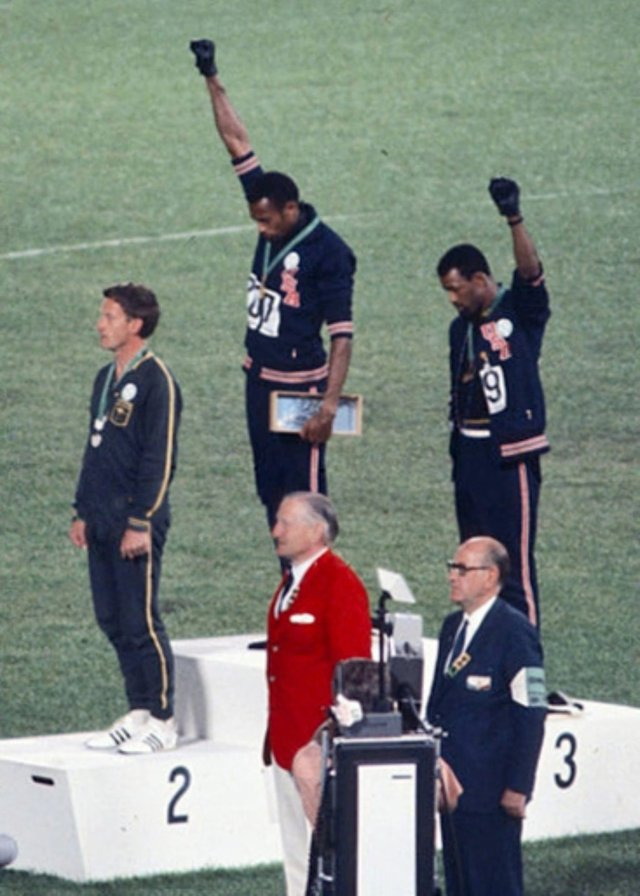
Tommie Smith and John Carlos perform the Black Power salute during the 1968 Summer Olympics.

Athlete activism is activism performed by athletes, both during sports events and outside them.

== History ==
Early examples of top-tier athletes using their status and position to advocate for social justice date to the beginning of the 20th century, increasing in prominence during the 1960s and 1970s, and significantly growing in the 21st century. The participation of Black athletes in professional sports in countries with racial segregation, and the prominence of top-tier Black players, has made sports a constant site of contention regarding societies' understanding of race and racism.

Athletes have also engaged in activism around women's rights issues, particularly inequality of pay and funding between men's and women's sport and gendered standards of attire for uniforms. Parasports are also a site of activist engagement around disability. During the COVID-19 pandemic, athletes engaged in more activism on racial justice, after the George Floyd killing, and on many other issues, such as mental health, which were addressed widely in activist causes.

== Forms ==
Activism has taken the form of both symbolic protests, such as the 1968 Olympics Black Power salute, as well as athletes engaging in existing political movements. Athletes have engaged in activism at both the professional and amateur level, often at the risk of significant repercussions to their career and financial prospects both from official sporting bodies and private sponsors. In some cases, such as Jesse Owens's participation in the 1936 Summer Olympics, an athlete's decisions to attend or represent a given country at an event may be analyzed through the lens of activism, even if the athlete did not consider themself to be an activist.

== See also ==
- Athlete activism in the United States
- Politics and sports
