= The Rocky Horror Picture Show: Let's Do the Time Warp Again (soundtrack) =

Soundtrack album by various artists
- Released: October 21, 2016
- Recorded: 2015–16
- Genres: Glam rock, musical theatre, soundtrack
- Length: 48:52
- Label: Ode Sounds & Visuals
- Producer: Cisco Adler

The Rocky Horror Picture Show: Let's Do the Time Warp Again is the original soundtrack album to the 2016 remake of the 1975 cult classic film The Rocky Horror Picture Show. The soundtrack was released by Columbia Records (as Ode Sounds & Visuals), and produced by Grammy Award-nominated songsmith Cisco Adler. In addition to playing Columbia, Annaleigh Ashford also provided backup vocals for "Science Fiction / Double Feature", and its reprise.

"The Time Warp", performed by Reeve Carney, Christina Milian, Tim Curry, and Annaleigh Ashford, was released on August 16, 2016, when the album became available for pre-order on iTunes. Victoria Justice's "Toucha, Toucha, Toucha, Touch Me" came out on September 15. "Over at the Frankenstein Place" sung by Justice, Ryan McCartan, and Carney was released on October 6. "Sweet Transvestite", by Laverne Cox and McCartan, and "Science Fiction/Double Feature", by Ivy Levan, were also among the total of five songs available for download before the full soundtrack release.

== Track listing ==
All tracks are written by Richard O'Brien.

No.	Title	Performer(s)	Length
1.	"Science Fiction/Double Feature"	Ivy Levan	4:30
2.	"Dammit Janet"	Ryan McCartan; Victoria Justice	2:36
3.	"Over at the Frankenstein Place"	Justice; McCartan; Reeve Carney	2:21
4.	"The Time Warp"	Carney; Christina Milian; Tim Curry; Annaleigh Ashford	4:08
5.	"Sweet Transvestite"	Laverne Cox; McCartan	3:41
6.	"Sword of Damocles"	Staz Nair	2:21
7.	"I Can Make You a Man"	Cox	2:09
8.	"Hot Patootie (Bless My Soul) What Ever Happened to Saturday Night"	Adam Lambert	3:06
9.	"I Can Make You a Man" (reprise)	Cox	1:40
10.	"Toucha, Toucha, Toucha, Touch Me"	Justice	2:42
11.	"Once in a While"	McCartan	2:35
12.	"Eddie"	Ben Vereen	2:44
13.	"Planet Schmanet Janet"	Cox	1:45
14.	"Planet Hot Dog"	Cox; McCartan; Vereen; Justice	0:43
15.	"Rose Tint My World"	Ashford; Nair; McCartan; Justice	2:42
16.	"Don't Dream It"	Cox; Curry; Vereen; McCartan; Justice	3:01
17.	"Wild and Untamed Thing"	Cox; Carney	2:02
18.	"I'm Going Home"	Cox	2:29
19.	"Super Heroes"	McCartan; Justice; Curry	2:04
20.	"Science Fiction/Double Feature" (reprise)	Lambert; Levan	2:53
Total length:			48:52

== Charts ==
Chart performance for The Rocky Horror Picture Show: Let's Do the Time Warp Again
Chart (2016)	Peak position
UK Soundtrack Albums (Official Charts)	13
US Billboard 200	107
US Independent Albums (Billboard)	9
US Top Rock Albums (Billboard)	22
US Soundtrack Albums (Billboard)	2
