= The Rocky Horror Glee Show =

- Glee episode
- Episode no.: Season 2 Episode 5
- Directed by: Adam Shankman
- Story by: Ryan Murphy; Tim Wollaston
- Teleplay by: Ryan Murphy
- Production code: 2ARC05
- Original air date: October 26, 2010

Guest appearances
- John Stamos as Dr. Carl Howell; Meat Loaf Aday as Barry Jeffries; Barry Bostwick as Tim Stanwick; Iqbal Theba as Principal Figgins; Harry Shum, Jr. as Mike Chang; Chord Overstreet as Sam Evans; Max Adler as Dave Karofsky; James Earl as Azimio; Bill A. Jones as Rod Remington; Earlene Davis as Andrea Carmichael; Lauren Potter as Becky Jackson

Episode chronology
← Previous "Duets"	Next → "Never Been Kissed"
- Glee season 2

"The Rocky Horror Glee Show" is the fifth episode of the second season of the American television series Glee, and the twenty-seventh episode overall. It was written by series creator Ryan Murphy, from a story by Murphy and Tim Wollaston, directed by Adam Shankman, and premiered on Fox on October 26, 2010. The episode features the glee club paying tribute to the 1973 musical The Rocky Horror Show, with elements of its 1975 film adaptation The Rocky Horror Picture Show, by staging it as a school musical. While cheerleading coach Sue Sylvester (Jane Lynch) attempts to sabotage the production, glee club director Will Schuester (Matthew Morrison) dwells on his feelings for guidance counselor Emma Pillsbury (Jayma Mays), and club members Finn (Cory Monteith) and Sam (Chord Overstreet) deal with body image issues. Barry Bostwick and Meat Loaf, who star in the original film, appear in cameo roles in this episode.

Elements of Rocky Horror were sanitized for the episode, including the costumes and lyrics. Creator Richard O'Brien expressed disappointment in the dilution of the musical's themes, and a spokesperson for the Gay & Lesbian Alliance Against Defamation criticized the episode for its use of the term "tranny". Watched by 11.76 million US viewers, "The Rocky Horror Glee Show" was the fifth consecutive episode of Glee to become the top-rated program on the night of broadcast in the 18–49 demographic. It received a mixed response from critics, was alternatively deemed the series' best ever themed-episode by Rolling Stone's Erica Futterman, and was described as the worst hour in the show's history by Emily St. James of The A.V. Club.

The episode featured cover versions of seven Rocky Horror songs, which were released on an extended play album. Glee: The Music, The Rocky Horror Glee Show reached number six on the Billboard 200. It marked the lowest debut and sales for the Glee cast in the US, but the highest position ever reached for a Rocky Horror album. The songs attracted mixed commentary, particularly the performance of "Time Warp", which was given a grade of "A+" by Entertainment Weekly's Tim Stack, but derided by Matt Zoller Seitz of Slant Magazine as "very possibly the weakest, most uninspired rendition" he had ever heard.

== Plot ==
The episode opens with the red lips of glee club member Santana Lopez (Naya Rivera) against a black background as she sings "Science Fiction/Double Feature". In the school auditorium, the glee club members rehearse The Rocky Horror Show, performing "Over at the Frankenstein Place". They are interrupted by Dr. Carl Howell (John Stamos), who accuses club director Will Schuester of trying to steal his girlfriend, school guidance counselor Emma Pillsbury. The episode continues in flashback format, with Will recalling the events leading up to Carl's accusation.

Will learns that Emma and Carl attended a midnight screening of The Rocky Horror Picture Show, which helped to lessen some of her obsessive–compulsive behaviors. As Emma is a fan, Will decides to direct the glee club in a production of the musical, casting co-captains Finn Hudson and Rachel Berry (Lea Michele) in the lead roles of Brad and Janet, Mike Chang (Harry Shum, Jr.) as Dr. Frank-N-Furter, and Sam Evans as Rocky. While Sam is proud of his physique and secure in his own body-image, Finn feels self-conscious at the prospect of appearing in his underwear, as the role necessitates.

Cheerleading coach Sue Sylvester is approached by news station managers Tim Stanwick (Barry Bostwick) and Barry Jeffries (Meat Loaf) about producing an undercover exposé of the play, and convinces Will to involve her in the production. When Mike's parents refuse to let him play Dr. Frank-N-Furter, a transvestite, Sue manipulates Carl into saving the musical. He auditions with the song "Hot Patootie", but feels that it would be more appropriate for him to play Eddie. The role of Frank, traditionally played by a male, is instead claimed by Mercedes Jones (Amber Riley).

Will grows increasingly jealous of Carl as he joins the production. When Sam becomes hesitant to wear his skimpy costume, Will decides that he will play Rocky instead, and asks Emma to rehearse the suggestive "Touch-a, Touch-a, Touch-a, Touch Me" with him. Will is later called into Principal Figgins' (Iqbal Theba) office, where he learns that Finn has been suspended for walking through the hallway in his underwear, attempting to become comfortable with his costume. He convinces Figgins to reduce Finn's punishment, and the episode returns to the opening scene as Carl confronts Will over his private rehearsal with Emma. Alerted to Sue's planned exposé, Will concedes that his motivations in putting on the production were questionable. He tells Emma that he will cease interfering with her relationship. Though he cancels the play, he has the glee club perform it for themselves, and the episode ends with a group rendition of "Time Warp".

== Production ==
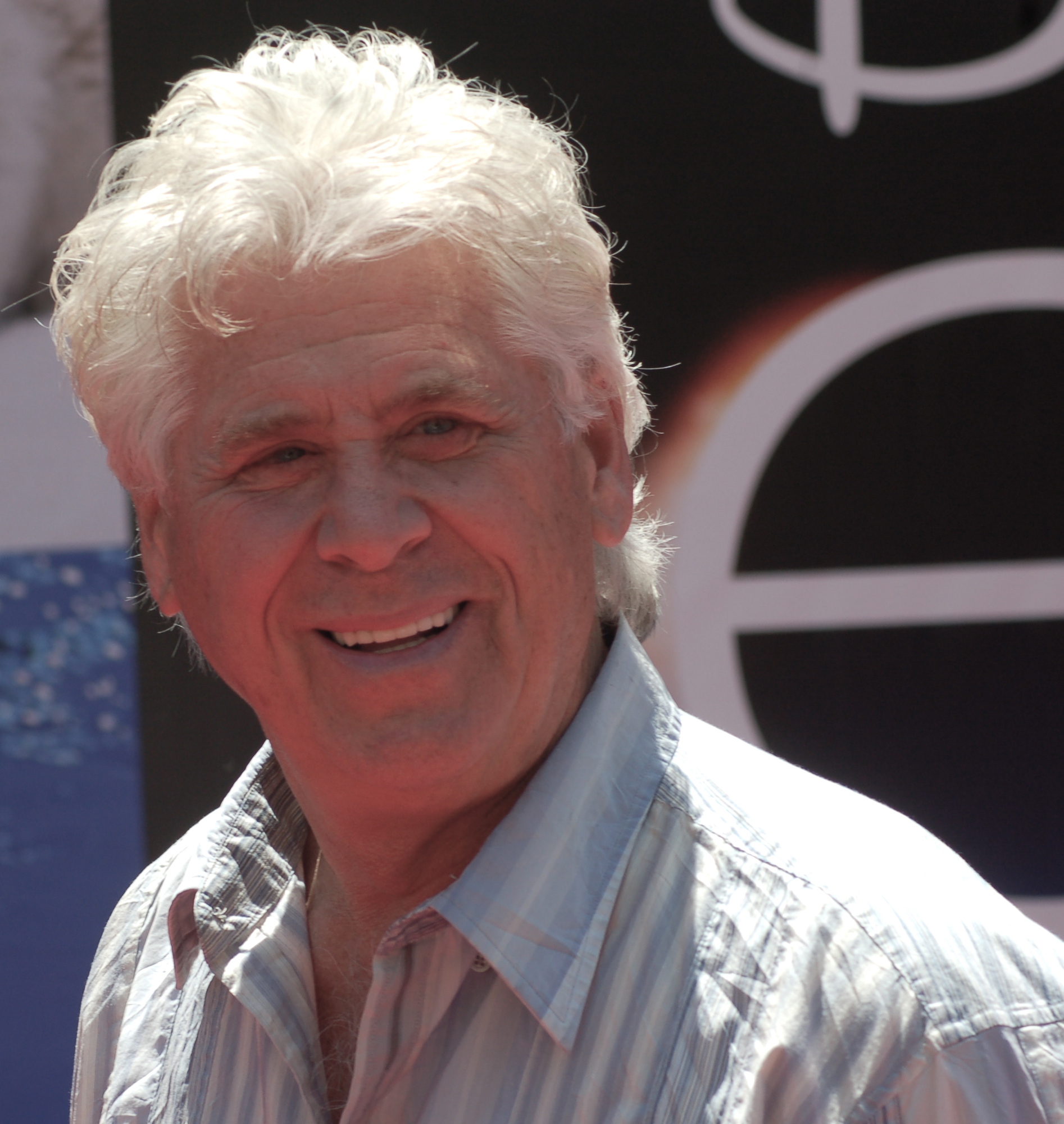
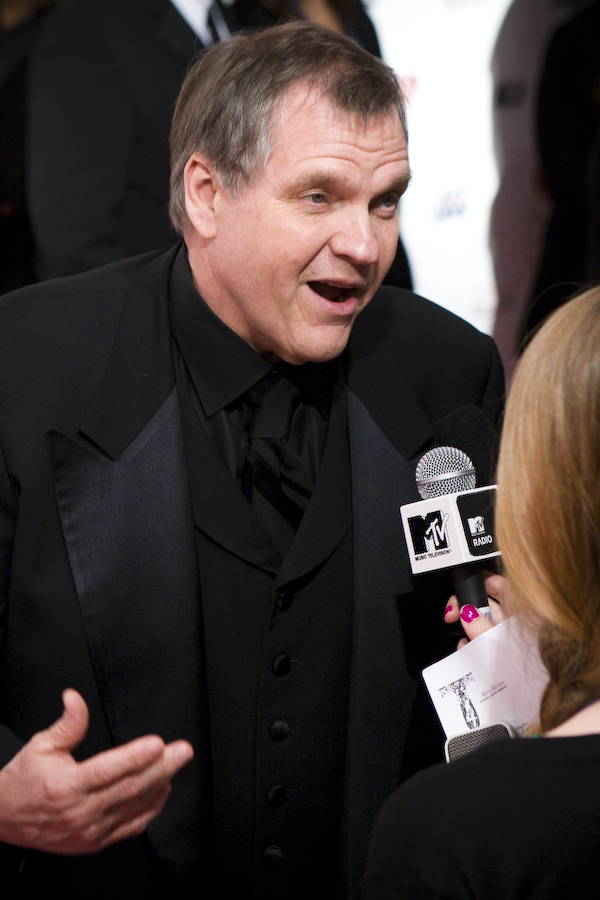
Original Rocky Horror Picture Show cast members Barry Bostwick (left) and Meat Loaf (right) make cameo appearances in this episode.

When casting Glee, series creator Ryan Murphy required that auditioning actors without theatrical experience demonstrate their ability to sing and dance as well as act. Mays, who was cast as guidance counselor Emma Pillsbury, auditioned with the song "Touch-a, Touch-a, Touch-a, Touch Me" from The Rocky Horror Picture Show. In April 2009, Murphy told the Los Angeles Times that he would like to have Mays perform the song on Glee. In October 2009, cast member Chris Colfer deemed "Time Warp" the song he would most like to perform on the show, and suggested a Rocky Horror-themed Halloween episode. Colfer re-iterated his desire to perform "Time Warp" at the 2010 San Diego Comic-Con, which prompted Murphy to reveal that a Glee episode devoted to Rocky Horror was planned for the show's second season. At the 2010 Television Critics Association Summer Press Tour, Murphy stated he would be directing the episode, and also revealed that Adam Shankman would guest-direct one of the first ten episodes of the season. Shankman later revealed via the social networking website Twitter that he would in fact be directing the Rocky Horror episode, and commented, "Rocky Horror, while really risqué, is perfect for Glee because they all, in theory, feel like misfits."

Elements of Rocky Horror were sanitized for the episode, and Shankman believes that he was sought out in order to make the production more audience appropriate. Stamos was initially set to play Dr. Frank N. Furter, but the role was recast due to network resistance. Costumes used in the episode were inspired by the Rocky Horror musical and film, but were adapted for the Glee cast and cost over $30,000. The tight gold lamé underwear worn by Peter Hinwood in the 1975 film were replaced by board shorts for Overstreet. In dressing Riley as Frank, series costume designer Lou Eyrich found it challenging to select outfits which would be acceptable for a primetime series, yet would still appeal to all audiences. To appeal to younger viewers, Eyrich updated the costume worn by Colfer as Riff Raff, pairing a tailcoat with jeans and a J.Crew henley shirt. Michele's costuming as Janet was similar to her regular wardrobe as Rachel, with Eyrich commenting, "That's why she was the perfect Janet." Prior to broadcast, cast member Mark Salling claimed that he would play Rocky Horror's talking lips. In the event, however, Salling did not appear in the episode. He was temporarily absent from the series, reportedly for creative reasons, and returned in November 2010. The lips were instead played by Rivera.

Original Rocky Horror cast members Barry Bostwick and Meat Loaf guest-starred in the episode. Bostwick deemed their roles "stunt casting", but suggested his character may return to the show in future and become involved with Sue. Susan Sarandon told People she was open to appearing in the episode depending on the role, and stated that she was flattered by the planned Glee tribute, but was not approached about appearing. An advance midnight screening of the episode was previewed on October 21, 2010 at the Angelika Film Center in New York City.

== Reception ==
=== Ratings ===
In its original broadcast, "The Rocky Horror Glee Show" was watched by 11.76 million US viewers and attained a 4.9/13 Nielsen rating/share in the 18–49 demographic. For the fifth consecutive episode, Glee was the top-rated program of the night among adults aged 18–49. Both viewership and ratings rose from the previous episode, "Duets", which was watched by 11.36 million viewers and attained a 4.7/13 rating/share among adults aged 18–49. In the weekly program rankings, Glee was the fifth most-viewed show among adults 18–49, and the second scripted show behind only Modern Family. In overall viewers, it placed twentieth for the week.

In Canada, the episode was watched by 2.48 million viewers, ranking as the fourth most-watched program for the week of broadcast. Viewership was again up on "Duets", which attained 2.25 million viewers and ranked seventh. The episode's Australian broadcast drew 1.34 million viewers, making Glee the fifth most-watched show of the night and the most-watched with viewers aged under 50. It placed eleventh in the weekly program rankings. There also, "The Rocky Horror Glee Show" registered a rise on the previous episode, which was watched by 1.04 million viewers, placed ninth on the night and twenty-eighth for the week. In the UK, the episode was watched by 2.50 million viewers—2.121 million on E4, and 385,000 on E4+1—becoming the most-watched show on cable for the week. Viewership remained static from "Duets", which also attained an audience of 2.50 million.

=== Critical response ===
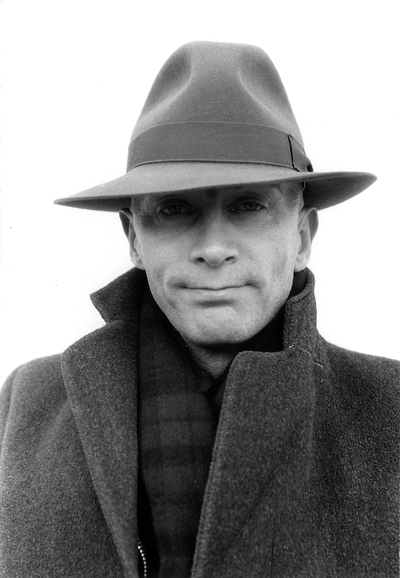
Rocky Horror creator Richard O'Brien (pictured) expressed disappointment with the episode's sanitization.

Rocky Horror creator Richard O'Brien was disappointed that the episode diluted the themes of the musical, and was puzzled that the word "transsexual" was censored. Matt Kane, entertainment media manager for the Gay & Lesbian Alliance Against Defamation, criticized the use of the pejorative term "tranny" in its place, and found it "particularly alarming" given that the season one episode "Theatricality" presented a negative reaction to the use of a homophobic slur. Critics had a mixed reaction to the episode. Emily St. James of The A.V. Club graded it an "F" and said it was "the worst hour this show has ever produced". She felt that it was overly ambitious, and that in attempting to skirt humorously around the issue of transsexuals, the end result was "more offensive than if the show had simply ignored the whole thing to begin with." Matt Zoller Seitz of Slant Magazine called it a "travesty" and criticized "the arms-length treatment of the Frank N. Furter character", and Amy Reiter of the Los Angeles Times deemed the episode flawed through its sanitization, despite initially having found the two shows "a particularly promising match".

"The Rocky Horror Glee Show" received several favorable comparisons to previous themed episodes; Erica Futterman of Rolling Stone deemed it the best yet. Both Entertainment Weekly's Tim Stack and Jarett Wieselman of the New York Post preferred it to the Britney Spears tribute episode "Britney/Brittany"; Wieselman hailed it as a "run-away success" that would satisfy Rocky Horror fans without being a "homage for homage's sake" like the Spears episode, and Stack felt that Rocky Horror was a "perfect fit" for Glee, due to thematic similarities between the two. While previous Glee tributes attracted criticism for their focus on musical numbers to the detriment of plot, Jenna Mullins of E! Online and CBS News' Jessica Derschowitz appreciated that "The Rocky Horror Glee Show" was more story-driven.

Critics generally disliked the focus the episode placed on the adult characters, with many objecting to Will's characterisation. St. James wrote that his storyline with Emma "misplac[ed] what made either of the characters enjoyable in the first place", and IGN's Robert Canning—who otherwise enjoyed the episode, and rated it 8.5/10—observed that Will was presented as being selfish and a "terrible educator", in contrast to his former role as the moral centre of the show. Lisa de Moraes of The Washington Post initially found the focus on the adults a welcome change, but felt their storyline rapidly became convoluted. Anthony Benigno of the Daily News liked Will less as the episode progressed, and deemed it overall, "Creepy, vaguely uncomfortable, in slightly poor taste but well-intentioned, and ultimately, thoroughly entertaining to watch for reasons I can't quite put into words." CNN's Lisa Respers France actually enjoyed the episode for the additional depth it brought to Will and his feelings for Emma, as well as Finn and his body image issues. While Stack commended the male body image storyline, and found it refreshing for a program to examine the objectification of men, de Moraes derided it, and likened Finn and Sam's discussion about eating healthily and working out to an "after school special".

The episode's conclusion—in which Will declares that the original Rocky Horror fans and New Directions members are united by their outcast status—was widely criticized, with St. James deeming it a "series lowpoint", and "a muddled, terrible message, particularly in an episode that seems to have an uneasy relationship with actual outcasts, transsexuals." Both Reiter and Aly Semigran of MTV questioned the resolution, with Reiter stating that it was unclear what message the creators were attempting to convey, and Semigran finding it disjointed, suggesting "The Rocky Horror Glee Show" to be a "rare Glee misstep".

== Music ==
=== Performances ===
Seven Rocky Horror songs were covered in the episode. The opening number of "Science Fiction/Double Feature", performed by Rivera and represented by a disembodied pair of red lips, mirrored the opening to The Rocky Horror Picture Show. The song segued into a rehearsal of "Over at the Frankenstein Place", which was followed by a rehearsal of "Dammit Janet"—the former with Michele on lead vocals, and the latter featuring Michele, Monteith, Colfer, Agron and Riley. Stamos' first vocal performance for the series followed, as he gave a rendition of "Hot Patootie". Stamos reportedly feigned illness in order to work with a private vocal coach and dance instructor on the number, and hired his own studio in which to rehearse. The performance entailed a shot-by-shot recreation of the original choreography. "Sweet Transvestite" featured Riley on lead vocals, and "Touch-a, Touch-a, Touch-a, Touch Me" showcased Mays, in her first lead performance since "I Could Have Danced All Night" in season one. The episode then closed with a group rendition of "Time Warp".

=== Commentary ===
Musical performances in the episode attracted mixed commentary, particularly "Time Warp". Stack rated all of the songs a "B" grade or higher, and gave "Time Warp" the highest grade of an "A+". He called it his favorite moment of the episode, and praised its energy; he wrote that Quinn made a "surprisingly good" Magenta. Semigran also praised the number, and commended the performances by Morris, Monteith, Agron and particularly Colfer, who, she wrote, "looked and sounded the part so well, you'd swear you were watching the original Rocky Horror Picture Show". In a generally negative review of the episode, Reiter commented that despite her dissatisfaction, she found herself singing along to "Time Warp" with "disconcerting enthusiasm", and was "nostalgically transported against [her] better judgment". In contrast, VanDerWerff stated that she would have increased her review of the episode from an "F" to a "D" had "Time Warp" been better, as she had "never seen a more lifeless version". Zoller Seitz similarly called it "very possibly the weakest, most uninspired rendition" he had ever seen, and criticized the side-lining of Colfer in favor of Monteith.

Semigran said the song "Dammit Janet" was "spirited and spot-on", and Benigno graded it an "A", though observed that it was "painfully obvious" Michele and Monteith were lip-syncing. Futterman described the performance as "fully engaged, campy to the max and totally on point". "Hot Patootie" resulted in praise for Stamos, with Stack grading it an "A" and comparing it favorably to the actor's singing on Full House, and Semigran recommending that he be cast in a Broadway revival of The Rocky Horror Show. Benigno wrote that his voice lacked Meat Loaf's "rock n' roll howl", but praised his charisma and dancing, and graded the performance an "A−".

Critics disagreed over the casting of Mercedes as Frank. Semigran felt that, as sung by a female, "Sweet Transvestite" lost its shock value. Raymund Flandez of The Wall Street Journal would have preferred Salling's Puck in the role, but praised Riley's vocals, writing that her solo "woke us all up from the timid pacing". Benigno also enjoyed the number, and found that while Mercedes lacked the stage presence of Tim Curry, Riley did something "completely remarkable" as Frank, giving a largely flawless performance. He named "Touch-a, Touch-a, Touch-a, Touch Me" the best song of the episode, and graded it "A+". Despite finding the episode "abrupt, uneven [and] sanitized", Flandez felt that it was saved by this performance. Futterman remarked that having Emma in the role of Janet was "ideal", but preferred the song visually to vocally. Zoller Seitz disliked the change in Emma's characterization which brought about the number, and while he wrote that "Mays was so charming that she almost, almost saved it", he ultimately found the "motivational contortions" insulting to the audience.

=== Chart history ===
Glee: The Music, The Rocky Horror Glee Show, an extended play accompanying the episode, was released on October 19, 2010. Its track list includes each of the seven songs covered. The soundtrack debuted at number six on the Billboard 200, with 48,000 copies sold. It marked the lowest debut and sales for the Glee cast in the US, but the highest position ever reached for a Rocky Horror album. The EP attained lower chart positions internationally, peaking at number eight in Australia, ten in Canada, fifteen in Ireland, and twenty-three in the UK. "Time Warp" was the only song from the EP to chart on the Billboard Hot 100, attaining a position of eighty-nine. Internationally, its highest peak was in Ireland, where it reached number forty-two. "Touch-a, Touch-a, Touch-a, Touch Me" was the only other track from the EP to place on the singles charts, peaking at number seventy-two in the UK.
