= The Rocky Horror Picture Show: Let's Do the Time Warp Again =

2016 American film directed by Kenny Ortega

- One of pre-release posters
- Based on: The Rocky Horror Picture Show by Jim Sharman; Richard O'Brien The Rocky Horror Show and The Rocky Horror Show Live by Richard O'Brien
- Directed by: Kenny Ortega
- Starring: Laverne Cox; Victoria Justice; Ryan McCartan; Annaleigh Ashford; Adam Lambert; Reeve Carney; Christina Milian; Staz Nair; Ivy Levan; Ben Vereen; Tim Curry
- Narrated by: Tim Curry
- Music by: Richard Hartley; Richard O'Brien
- Country of origin: United States
- Original language: English

Production
- Executive producers: Lou Adler; Gail Berman; Kenny Ortega
- Producer: John Ryan
- Cinematography: Luc Montpellier
- Editor: Don Brochu
- Running time: 88 minutes (TV cut); 93 minutes (Extended cut)
- Production companies: Fox 21 Television Studios; Ode Sounds & Visuals; The Jackal Group
- Budget: $20 million

Original release
- Network: Fox
- Release: October 20, 2016

The Rocky Horror Picture Show: Let's Do the Time Warp Again (also known as The Rocky Horror Picture Show Event and The Rocky Horror Picture Show) is a 2016 American musical comedy television film. It is a tribute to and remake of the cult classic 1975 film of the same name and directed by Kenny Ortega, using the original script written by Richard O'Brien and Jim Sharman.

Starring an ensemble cast led by Laverne Cox, the film premiered on the Fox network on October 20, 2016.

== Plot ==
The plot of the tribute is fundamentally identical to the original film, with some additional scenes wrapped around the film. These scenes show several people attending a theatrical showing of The Rocky Horror Picture Show, and subsequently are used to introduce some of the audience participation elements from the original film (such as throwing toilet paper on the line "Great Scott!").

== Cast ==
- Laverne Cox as Dr. Frank-N-Furter, the Mad Scientist
- Victoria Justice as Janet Weiss, the Heroine
- Ryan McCartan as Brad Majors, the Hero
- Annaleigh Ashford as Columbia, the Groupie
- Adam Lambert as Eddie, the Ex-Delivery Boy
- Reeve Carney as Riff-Raff, the Handyman
- Christina Milian as Magenta, the Domestic Servant
- Staz Nair as Rocky Horror, Frank's Creation
- Ivy Levan as Trixie, the Usherette
- Ben Vereen as Dr. Everett von Scott, the Rival Scientist
- Tim Curry as the Narrator/Criminologist. This film marked Curry’s final television acting appearance prior to his death in 2026.
- Jayne Eastwood as The Butler
- Jeff Lillico as Ralph Hapschatt
- Kelly Van der Burg as Betty Hapschatt-Munroe
- Sal Piro as The Photographer

== Musical numbers ==
1. "Science Fiction/Double Feature" - Trixie
2. "Dammit Janet" - Brad, Janet, and Chorus
3. "There's a Light (Over at the Frankenstein Place)" - Janet, Brad, Phantoms, and Riff Raff
4. "The Time Warp" - Riff Raff, Magenta, The Criminologist, Columbia, and Transylvanians
5. "Sweet Transvestite" - Frank
6. "The Sword of Damocles" - Rocky
7. "I Can Make You a Man" - Frank
8. "Hot Patootie – Bless My Soul" - Eddie
9. "I Can Make You a Man" (reprise) - Frank, Janet, and Transylvanians
10. "Touch-a, Touch-a, Touch-a, Touch Me" - Janet with Magenta, Columbia, and Rocky
11. "Once in a While"† - Brad
12. "Eddie" - Dr. Scott, The Criminologist, Janet, Frank, and Columbia
13. "Planet Schmanet Janet (Wise Up Janet Weiss)" - Frank, Janet, Brad, and Dr. Scott
14. "Rose Tint My World" - Columbia, Rocky, Janet, and Brad
15. "Fanfare/Don't Dream It, Be It" - Frank
16. "Wild and Untamed Thing" - Frank and Riff Raff
17. "I'm Going Home" - Frank
18. "The Time Warp" (reprise) - Riff Raff and Magenta
19. "Super Heroes" - Brad, Janet, and Chorus
20. "Science Fiction/Double Feature" (reprise) - Trixie and Eddie

† denotes songs only present in the extended cut.

== Production ==
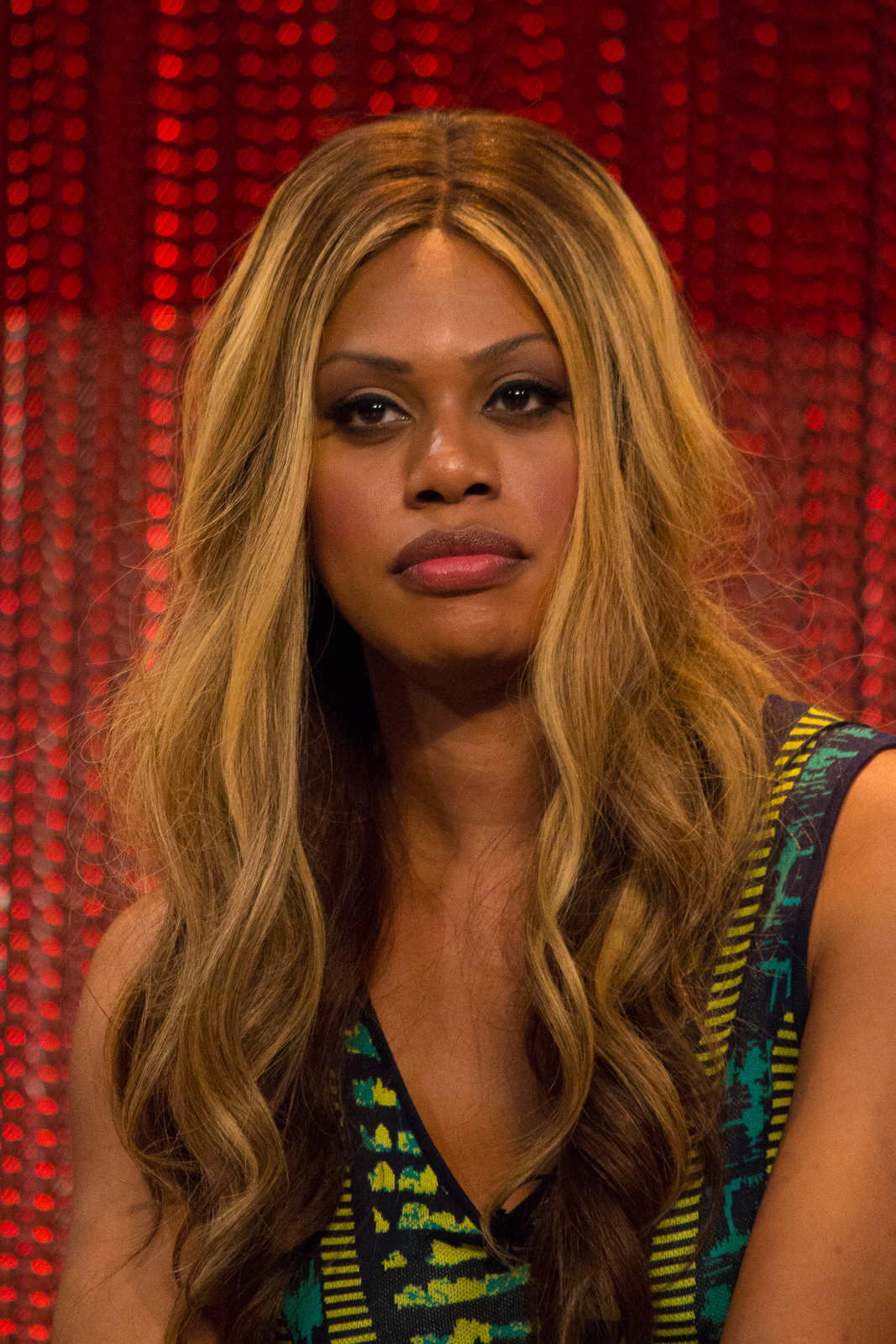
Laverne Cox portrayed Dr. Frank-N-Furter

Plans for a remake at Fox date back to 2002, when a 2003 release date was under consideration to mark the 30-year anniversary of the musical which spawned the film, a remake for which former Broadway producer Gail Berman would have been involved as co-producer. MTV had planned a remake, set for 2008 and for which Berman was again tapped to produce, but both plans fell through.

On April 10, 2015, it was announced that Kenny Ortega, best known for directing the film Hocus Pocus, the High School Musical trilogy, and Michael Jackson's This Is It, would direct the remake. On October 21, 2015, Emmy Award nominee Laverne Cox, best known for her role as prisoner Sophia Burset on Netflix's prison comedy-drama Orange Is the New Black, joined the cast to play Dr. Frank-N-Furter, the mad-scientist role originated by Tim Curry in the 1970s. Curry, in turn, was cast as the Criminologist, which had been played by Charles Gray in the original. Lou Adler, who produced the original film, also co-produced the remake, along with Gail Berman and Kenny Ortega; Ortega also directed and choreographed the film. The creative team planned "to stick faithfully to the text and the score of the original but greatly re-imagine the story visually".

Much of the film was shot at Toronto's Casa Loma, being used for both Frank N. Furter's castle and the "Castle" movie theatre where the audience participation scenes and Ivy Levan's performance of "Science Fiction/Double Feature" were filmed. A theatre marquee was temporarily erected at the front entrance for these scenes.

An unreleased virtual reality experience was in development at the time. A 360-degree video camera rig can be seen in a behind-the-scenes video released by Fox during a marketing promotion.

== Release ==
The world premiere of the film was on October 18, 2016 at MIPCOM. The film premiered on Fox on October 20, 2016. The first 25 minutes of the film were screened at San Diego Comic-Con, as well as RKO Con 2, a Rocky Horror convention in Providence, Rhode Island.

The Rocky Horror Picture Show: Let's Do the Time Warp Again was released on DVD on December 6, 2016. An extended cut of the film was included featuring deleted scenes and the frequently excised song "Once in a While", as sung by Brad.

== Reception ==
=== Viewership ===
The movie drew 4.95 million viewers, with a 1.7 rating and a 6 share in the 18-49 demographic.

=== Critical reception ===
The special received mixed to negative reviews. Many critics agreed that the production would have been better if it were live, raising questions why Fox decided not to do it live, given the success the network had with Grease: Live. On Rotten Tomatoes, it has a 29% score based on 42 reviews; the critical consensus states, "Laverne Cox's fabulous portrayal of Frank N. Furter leads a strong ensemble effort, but the stars can't infuse this reimagining with enough energy, creativity, and quirk to make TRHPS: Let's Do the Time Warp Again a worthwhile endeavor." On Metacritic, the film has a 55 out of 100 rating, based on 23 critics, indicating "mixed or average reviews".

Esther Zuckerman of The A.V. Club felt that the remake focused too much on the weirdness in the original film without acknowledging the campiness it had been filmed with. Viewers who had never seen the original film would be confused by the movie-within-a-movie approach used in the remake. Matt Tamanini of Broadwayworld.com said that the remake "was a strikingly disappointing missed opportunity" that "felt far more like a production on Glee than the actual production of Rocky Horror on Glee did", although he did praise the casting of Cox, saying "In the long history of The Rocky Horror Show, the musical has broken down doors and helped pave the way for an era of LGBT acceptance. So for Cox to step into Tim Curry's iconic fishnets is a victory in its own right."

=== Awards ===
The program was nominated for the GLAAD Media Award for Outstanding TV Movie or Limited Series.

== International broadcasts ==
The film was scheduled to be broadcast in New Zealand on TV3 on October 24, 2016, three days after its original broadcast. In UK, the film was first broadcast on October 28, 2016 on Sky Cinema Premiere.
