= The Rocky Horror Picture Show (soundtrack) =

Soundtrack album by various artists
- Released: 1975
- Genres: Glam rock; pop rock; rock and roll
- Length: 45:04
- Label: Ode
- Producer: Richard Hartley

The Rocky Horror Picture Show is the original soundtrack album to the 1975 film The Rocky Horror Picture Show, an adaptation of the 1973 musical The Rocky Horror Show. The 1975 soundtrack album was released by Ode Records and produced by Richard Hartley.

It should not be confused with The Rocky Horror Show album, a recording of the theatrical music by Tim Curry and the original cast from The Roxy Theatre. The latter album was released in 1974, also by Ode Records.

== Release and reception ==
Professional ratings
Review scores
Source	Rating
AllMusic	5/5 stars

The album peaked at No. 49 on the Billboard 200 in 1978. It reached No. 12 on the Australian albums chart and No. 11 on the New Zealand albums chart. In 2010, William Ruhlmann of AllMusic gave the album a retrospective star rating of five stars out of five and described it as the "definitive version of the [Rocky Horror] score". This version of the soundtrack was certified Gold by the RIAA on 23 February 1981.

Following its initial release, the album was not successful, and was deleted everywhere but in Canada and South Africa. In South Africa, "Time Warp" was popular at nightclubs with its dance sequence. The track also had substantial indie radio play, as did "Science Fiction/Double Feature." "Over at the Frankenstein Place" was played on radio programs by request. Musica, a chain store of music shops in the Western Cape, sold out the album quickly and had to import. Marty Scott, co-founder of Jem Records, obtained a licensing agreement from Ode Records owner Lou Adler, which enabled the album to be imported to the United States. Scott also obtained a production and distribution license from Adler, which resulted in renewed interest in the album.

== Omitted songs ==
The original soundtrack release omits two songs sung in the film: Rocky (Trevor White)'s "The Sword of Damocles" and the Frank-N-Furter (Tim Curry)–led "Planet, Schmanet, Janet" (often referred to as "Wise Up, Janet Weiss"). Also omitted was "Once in a While", which was filmed but later cut.

All three songs were restored for the 25th anniversary release of the album (25 Years of Absolute Pleasure), though "Planet, Schmanet, Janet" lacks the final verse ("don't get hot and flustered") and they are in mono and ported directly from the film itself and so include all the sound effects and dialogue that would normally be omitted from a soundtrack album.

In 2011, these three songs were released, as MP3 format only, in their stereo, studio mixes on the download-only release The Rocky Horror Picture Show Complete Soundtrack: Absolute Treasures 2011 Special Edition. The 2011 album was later issued on double red vinyl for the film's 40th anniversary. However, incidental music and cues are not included and "The Sword of Damocles" features Brian Engel in place of Trevor White. The latter is included with Trevor White's vocals as a bonus track for the iTunes edition; this is the same version found on the 25 Years of Absolute Pleasure release, albeit in stereo and contains the dialogue and sound effects from the film.

== Track listing ==
=== Original 1975 release ===
All tracks are written by Richard O'Brien.

Side one
No.	Title	Performer	Length
1.	"Science Fiction/Double Feature"	Richard O'Brien	4:30
2.	"Dammit Janet"	Barry Bostwick, Susan Sarandon	2:51
3.	"Over at the Frankenstein Place"	Barry Bostwick, Susan Sarandon, Richard O'Brien	2:37
4.	"The Time Warp"	Richard O'Brien, Patricia Quinn, Little Nell	3:15
5.	"Sweet Transvestite"	Tim Curry	3:21
6.	"I Can Make You a Man"	Tim Curry	2:07
7.	"Hot Patootie – Bless My Soul"	Meat Loaf	3:00
8.	"I Can Make You a Man (Reprise)"	Tim Curry	1:44

Side two
No.	Title	Performer	Length
1.	"Touch-a, Touch-a, Touch-a, Touch Me"	Susan Sarandon, Little Nell, Patricia Quinn, Tim Curry, Barry Bostwick, Richard O'Brien, Brian Engel	2:27
2.	"Eddie"	Jonathan Adams, Little Nell, Susan Sarandon, Tim Curry	2:44
3.	"Rose Tint My World": a. "Floor Show" b. "Fanfare/Don't Dream It" c. "Wild and Untamed Thing"	Little Nell, Brian Engel, Barry Bostwick, Susan Sarandon, Tim Curry, Jonathan Adams	8:13
4.	"I'm Going Home"	Tim Curry	2:48
5.	"Super Heroes"	Barry Bostwick, Susan Sarandon, Charles Gray	2:45
6.	"Science Fiction/Double Feature (Reprise)"	Richard O'Brien	1:26
Total length:			45:04

=== Bonus tracks (1989 CD release) ===
1. "The Time Warp (Remix 1989 Extended Version)"
2. "The Time Warp (Music − 1 = Background Track + U Mix)"

=== 25 Years of Absolute Pleasure (2000) ===
No.	Title	Length
1.	"Science Fiction/Double Feature"	4:27
2.	"Dammit Janet"	3:22
3.	"Over at the Frankenstein Place"	3:59
4.	"Time Warp"	4:29
5.	"Sweet Transvestite"	4:06
6.	"Sword of Damocles"	3:38
7.	"I Can Make You a Man"	3:15
8.	"Hot Patootie - Bless My Soul"	3:21
9.	"I Can Make You a Man (Reprise)"	1:59
10.	"Once in a While"	3:45
11.	"Touch-a, Touch-a, Touch Me"	2:59
12.	"Eddie's Teddy"	2:47
13.	"Planet, Schmanet, Janet"	2:36
14.	"Rose Tint My World"	2:51
15.	"Don't Dream It, Be It"	3:36
16.	"Wild and Untamed Thing"	1:51
17.	"I'm Going Home"	2:57
18.	"Super Heroes"	5:20
19.	"Science Fiction/Double Feature (Reprise)"	1:30

=== Absolute Treasures: 40th Anniversary Re-Mastered Edition (2015) ===
No.	Title	Length
1.	"Science Fiction/Double Feature"	4:27
2.	"Dammit Janet"	3:23
3.	"Over at the Frankenstein Place"	3:59
4.	"Time Warp"	4:29
5.	"Sweet Transvestite"	4:06
6.	"Sword of Damocles"	3:38
7.	"I Can Make You a Man"	3:15
8.	"Hot Patootie - Bless My Soul"	3:21
9.	"I Can Make You a Man (Reprise)"	1:59
10.	"Touch-a, Touch-a, Touch Me"	2:59
11.	"Once in a While"	3:45
12.	"Eddie"	2:47
13.	"Planet, Schmanet, Janet"	2:36
14.	"Planet Hot Dog"	0:40
15.	"Rose Tint My World"	2:51
16.	"Fanfare/ Don't Dream It, Be It"	3:36
17.	"Wild and Untamed Thing"	1:51
18.	"I'm Going Home"	2:57
19.	"Super Heroes"	5:20
20.	"Science Fiction/Double Feature (Reprise)"	1:30

== Personnel ==
=== Cast ===
- Tim Curry – lead vocals (5, 7, 9, 13, 16, 18), co-lead vocals (12), spoken word (11)
- Richard O'Brien – lead vocals (1, 4,) co-lead vocals (3), backing vocals (2, 5, 12), spoken word (11)
- Patricia Quinn – co-lead vocals (4, 11), backing vocals (2, 5, 11), spoken word (11)
- Barry Bostwick – vocals (2, 3, 10, 14, 15), spoken word (5, 10, 13), backing vocals (11, 16)
- Susan Sarandon – vocals (2, 3, 9, 11, 15) backing vocals (12, 16), screaming (13)
- Little Nell – co-lead vocals (4, 10, 12, 15), backing vocals (5)
- Trevor White – dubbed vocals (6), dubbed co-lead vocals (15), backing vocals (12), spoken word (11)
- Charles Gray – spoken word (4, 12, 13)
- Meat Loaf – lead vocals (8), spoken word (11)
- Peter Hinwood – lip-synced lead vocals (6), lip-synced co-lead vocals (15), lip-synced spoken word (11) (film version)
- Jonathan Adams – spoken words (12, 13, 16), vocals (12, 14)

=== Musicians ===
- Count Ian Blair – electric and acoustic guitars
- Mick Grabham – electric guitar
- Dave Wintour – bass guitar
- B. J. Wilson – drums
- Phil Kenzie – saxophone
- John "Rabbit" Bundrick – keyboards
- Martin Briley, Helen Chappelle, Brian Engel, Barry St. John, Liza Strike, Clare Torry – backing vocals
- Richard Hartley – composer, arrangements (1–3, 10, 16)

== In popular culture ==
As announced by video game developer/publisher Activision in a press release on 12 October 2010, "Time Warp", "Sweet Transvestite", and "Hot Patootie – Bless My Soul" were released for the game Guitar Hero: Warriors of Rock as downloadable content on 26 October.

== Charts ==
The album initially charted in the US in 1978; however, in 2010, following the "Rocky Horror Glee Show" episode of Glee season 2, the album re-entered the Billboard 200 at number 55.

Chart (1976–1986)	Peak position
Australian Albums (Kent Music Report)	12
Austrian Albums (Ö3 Austria)	8
Canada Top Albums/CDs (RPM)	46
New Zealand Albums (RMNZ)	11
US Billboard 200	49
Chart (2010)	Peak position
US Billboard 200	55
US Billboard Top Soundtracks	4

== Certifications ==
Region	Certification	Certified units/sales
Australia (ARIA)	Gold	35,000^{^}
^{^} Shipments figures based on certification alone.
