= Dr. Frank-N-Furter =

Antagonist of the Rocky Horror Show and queer icon

- Rocky Horror character
- Tim Curry as Dr. Frank-N-Furter in the 1975 The Rocky Horror Picture Show
- First appearance: The Rocky Horror Show; 1973
- Last appearance: The Rocky Horror Picture Show: Let's Do the Time Warp Again; 2016
- Created by: Richard O'Brien
- Based on: Victor Frankenstein
- Portrayed by: Tim Curry; Laverne Cox

In-universe information
- Species: Transsexual Transylvanian
- Gender: Genderqueer
- Title: Dr.
- Occupation: Mad scientist
- Affiliation: Transsexual, Transylvania
- Significant others: Columbia, Eddie, Rocky, Janet Weiss, Brad Majors
- Origin: Planet Transsexual, Transylvania Galaxy

Dr. Frank-N-Furter is a character in The Rocky Horror Show (1973–1975) and its 1975 film adaptation The Rocky Horror Picture Show. Frank-N-Furter is a pansexual, cross-dressing, hedonist mad scientist alien from the planet Transsexual in an unidentified star system located in the fictional galaxy of Transylvania. He creates life in the form of the titular Rocky in an attempt to create the perfect man to fulfill their sizeable sexual desires while working with a crew of fellow Transsexualites on a mission to planet Earth, where their spaceship—which resembles a medieval castle—is docked. He serves as the main antagonist of the story and is regarded as the breakthrough character of Tim Curry.

English writer Richard O'Brien created Dr. Frank-N-Furter as a tribute to the science fiction and horror B movies of the 1930s through to the early 1960s. English actor Tim Curry originated and influenced the depiction of Furter, who remains his most memorable character and legacy. Furter is a queer icon with a widespread cult following who influenced countercultural and sexual liberation movements that followed on from the 1960s as one of the first popular characters to depict fluid sexuality during a time of division between generations and a lack of sexual difference acceptance. The character's name, along with those of the Transsexualites' homeland, are puns: "Frank-N-Furter" borrows both from the seminal mad scientist Victor Frankenstein and from the frankfurter (a type of sausage, with all of its phallic implications), while their home galaxy of Transylvania shares its name with the homeland of Count Dracula and his home planet of Transsexual shares a name aligning with his gender-nonconformity.

While Furter is most associated with Curry, the character has been played by many different actors in local Rocky Horror productions. Laverne Cox portrayed Furter in the 2016 remake The Rocky Horror Picture Show: Let's Do the Time Warp Again.

== Creation and conception ==
English writer and actor Richard O'Brien wrote The Rocky Horror Show between acting jobs in the early 1970s. Since his youth, he had a passion for science fiction and B horror movies; he wanted to combine elements of the unintentional humour of B horror movies, the portentous dialogue of schlock-horror, and aspects of Steve Reeves muscle films, transvestism, and 1950s rock and roll into The Rocky Horror Show. He conceived and wrote the play during the glam rock fad in British popular culture and has said: "glam rock allowed me to be myself more".

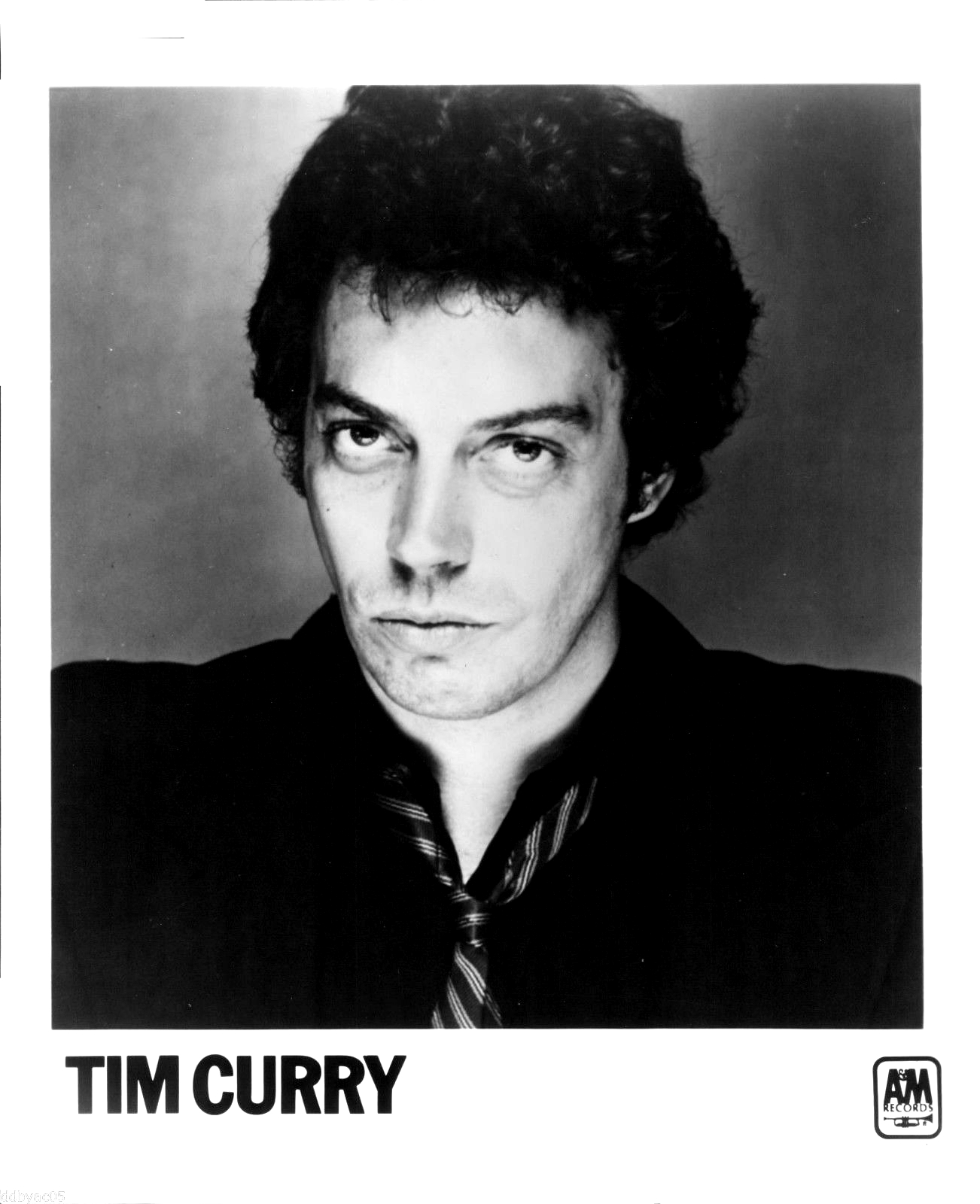
Tim Curry in the 1970s.

O'Brien took a small portion of his unfinished draft of the show to Australian director Jim Sharman, who decided he wanted to direct it at the small experimental space Upstairs at the Royal Court Theatre in Sloane Square, Chelsea, London. Sharman had met O'Brien in London when he directed the first British stage production of Jesus Christ Superstar and had selected O'Brien from the chorus to play King Herod for one stand-in performance. Tim Curry ran into O'Brien in London, who told Curry to talk to Sharman and gave him the script; Curry recalls thinking: "Boy, if this works, it's going to be a smash." The original creative team included costume designer Sue Blane and musical director Pete Moss. Michael White was brought in to produce the show. In rehearsal, the working title was They Came from Denton High, but it was changed just before previews at the suggestion of Sharman to The Rocky Horror Show.

After two previews, the show premiered without an interval at the Royal Court's 63-seat Theatre Upstairs on 19 June and ran until 20 July 1973. Curry, as Dr Frank-N-Furter, decided that the character should not be merely a drag queen but should speak in the extravagantly posh accent of Britain's Queen. In early rehearsals, Curry's original portrayal of the character was that of a blond-haired German, and then an American, before deciding on using the Queen's English on a whim after hearing an Englishwoman on the street.

== Appearances ==
=== The Rocky Horror Show ===
Brad Majors and Janet Weiss come across a castle and seek to use the telephone to call for help to fix the flat tyre of their car. As they arrive rainsoaked, Riff Raff, the hunchbacked handyman and live-in butler, greets them with his sister Magenta, the maid. Riff Raff, Magenta and Columbia (a groupie) mention a delivery boy, Eddie, who fell victim to unfortunate circumstances after he botched a delivery; they then perform a vigorous dance number ("Time Warp").

Alarmed, Brad and Janet attempt to leave but are stopped when Dr. Frank-N-Furter arrives and introduces themself as "a sweet transvestite from Transsexual, Transylvania" as they invite Brad and Janet up to his laboratory ("Sweet Transvestite"). Brad and Janet are stripped to their underwear to dry off.

In the laboratory, Frank-N-Furter gives Brad and Janet lab coats to wear. Frank announces they have discovered the secret to creating life itself. They unveil their creation, a blond muscle man, Rocky, who they bring to life. As his bandages are removed, Rocky appears anxious ("The Sword of Damocles"). Frank admires Rocky's physique in a tribute to bodybuilders ("Charles Atlas Song"/"I Can Make You a Man"). A Coca-Cola freezer in the laboratory opens to reveal Frank and Columbia's former lover, Eddie, a biker covered in surgical scars, who has been rendered a brain-damaged zombie. Intent on rescuing Columbia, Eddie rides crazily out of the freezer and causes extensive damage to Frank's laboratory ("Hot Patootie – Bless My Soul"). Furter panics, forces Eddie back into the freezer and hacks him to death. Furter tells Rocky, the recipient of half of Eddie's brain, they prefer his physique to Eddie's, and so Eddie had to go ("Charles Atlas Song" (reprise)/"I Can Make You a Man" (reprise)). Brad and Janet, flustered after witnessing Eddie's brutal murder, are ushered to separate bedrooms at the end of Act I.

At the start of Act II, the Narrator muses that Brad and Janet may be unsafe. Janet welcomes Brad's advances in her darkened bedroom before realising that it is Furter in disguise. He persuades Janet that pleasure is no crime; she asks him to promise not to tell Brad, and they resume making love. In Brad's darkened bedroom, Janet arrives to make love to Brad, who discovers that his lover is Furter in disguise. Furter promises not to tell Janet, and they resume, but Riff Raff interrupts on the television monitor with the message that Rocky has escaped. Janet searches for Brad in the laboratory and discovers Rocky hiding there. Checking the television monitor, Janet sees Brad in bed with Frank and seduces Rocky ("Touch-a, Touch-a, Touch-a, Touch Me"). The rest of the group discovers on the television monitor that Janet has slept with Rocky; Brad is hurt and angry ("Once in a While"). Riff Raff notifies Furter that there is another visitor entering the castle: Dr. Scott, the paraplegic science tutor whom Brad and Janet intended to visit.

Dr. Scott in a wheelchair is brought into the laboratory by Columbia, where Furter accuses him and Brad of spying on his castle, knowing that Dr. Scott has connections with the FBI. Dr Scott assures him that he has come in search of his nephew, Eddie ("Eddie's Teddy"). Furter displays Eddie's corpse to the group and then uses a device to electronically anchor the three visitors and a rebellious Rocky to the floor ("Planet Schmanet Janet"); the inhabitants of the castle are revealed to be space aliens led by Furter, who abandoned their original mission to engage in kinky sex with Earthlings and work on Rocky. Magenta insists that they return to their home planet now that they have been found out; Furter refuses and declares that it is time for a "floor show".

Under Furter's influence, Columbia, Rocky, Brad, and Janet perform song and dance routines while clad in lingerie ("Rose Tint My World (Floor Show)"). Furter entices them to lose all inhibition and give in to their natural carnal instincts, and an orgy ensues ("Don't Dream It – Be It"). Furter leads them into the rousing finale of the floor show ("Wild and Untamed Thing"). Riff Raff and Magenta arrive abruptly, wearing spacesuits and carrying ray guns. Riff Raff declares that he is usurping Frank's authority and taking them all back to their home planet ("Transit Beam"). Furter makes a plea for sympathy from Riff Raff, explaining his desire to spend his life having sex with Earthlings ("I'm Going Home"). Riff Raff is unmoved and shoots and kills Columbia, Furter, and Rocky before ordering Brad, Janet, and Dr. Scott to leave.

As the trio evacuates the castle, Riff Raff and Magenta express their excitement to return to their world and do the "Time Warp" again with their fellow Transylvanians ("Spaceship"). Brad and Janet watch as the castle blasts off into outer space, confused about the implications of their sexual escapades, as the Narrator sums up ("Super Heroes"). The Usherette recounts the night's events ("Science Fiction/Double Feature" (reprise), saying “Frank has built and lost his creature”.

=== The Rocky Horror Picture Show ===
Following the wedding of their friends, a naïve young couple, Brad Majors and Janet Weiss, get engaged and decide to celebrate with their high-school science teacher Dr. Scott, who taught the class where they first met. En route to Scott's house on a dark and rainy night, they get lost and suffer a flat tyre. Seeking a telephone to call for help, the couple walks to a nearby castle ("Over at the Frankenstein Place") where a party is being held. They are accepted in by the strangely dressed inhabitants, led by the butler Riff Raff, the maid Magenta, and a groupie named Columbia, who dance to "The Time Warp". Dr. Frank-N-Furter, a transvestite mad scientist, introduces themself and invites the two to stay for the night ("Sweet Transvestite").

With the help of Riff Raff, Furter brings to life a tall, muscular, handsome blond man named Rocky ("The Sword of Damocles"). As Furter vows they can improve Rocky into an ideal man in a week ("I Can Make You a Man"), Eddie, a motorcyclist with a bandaged head, breaks out of a deep freeze ("Hot Patootie – Bless My Soul"). Furter kills Eddie with an ice axe, justifying it as a "mercy killing". Rocky and Furter depart for the bridal suite ("I Can Make You a Man (Reprise)").

Janet and Brad are shown to separate bedrooms, where Furter visits and seduces each one disguised as the other. Meanwhile, Riff Raff torments Rocky, who flees the suite. Janet, having learned of Brad's dalliance with Furter, discovers Rocky cowering in his birth tank. While tending to his wounds, Janet seduces Rocky as Magenta and Columbia watch from their bedroom monitor ("Touch-a, Touch-a, Touch-a, Touch Me").

Dr. Scott, now a government investigator of UFOs, comes to the castle in search of his nephew Eddie, who sent him a letter implying part of his brain was removed by aliens. Furter is enraged after everyone discovers Janet and Rocky together. Magenta summons everyone to an uncomfortable dinner, which Furter reveals was prepared from Eddie's mutilated remains ("Eddie"). In the chaos, Janet runs screaming into Rocky's arms, provoking a jealous Furter to chase her through the halls to the lab, where they uses their Medusa Transducer to turn Dr. Scott, Brad, Janet, Rocky, and Columbia into nude statues ("Planet Schmanet Janet/Wise Up Janet Weiss"/"Planet Hotdog").

After dressing the statues in cabaret costumes, Furter "unfreezes" them and leads them in a live cabaret floor show, complete with an RKO tower and a swimming pool ("Rose Tint My World"/"Don't Dream It, Be It"/"Wild and Untamed Thing"). Riff Raff and Magenta interrupt and announce that due to Furter's extravagance, they are declaring mutiny and returning to their home planet of Transsexual, Transylvania. Furter makes a desperate plea for mercy ("I'm Going Home"), but is ignored as Riff Raff kills him and Columbia with a laser. An enraged Rocky climbs the tower with his creator's body as Riff Raff shoots him several times with the laser, but it does not work on him. When they climb too high, the tower collapses and Rocky plunges to his death in the pool. The castle lifts off into space, and Brad, Janet, and Dr. Scott are left crawling in the smog and dirt, confused and disorientated, as the criminologist concludes that the human race is equivalent to insects crawling on the planet's surface: "lost in time, and lost in space ... and meaning" ("Super Heroes"). The credits recount the night's events ("Science Fiction/Double Feature" (reprise), with the final singer saying “Frank has built and lost his creature”.

=== The Rocky Horror Picture Show: Let's Do the Time Warp Again ===
The plot of the tribute is fundamentally identical to the original film, with some additional scenes wrapped around the film. These scenes show several people attending a theatrical showing of The Rocky Horror Picture Show, and subsequently are used to introduce some of the audience participation elements from the original film (such as throwing toilet paper on the line "Great Scott!").

== Cultural influence and legacy ==
=== Initial critical and commercial reception ===
Furter's character was a creative, critical and commercial success. At the premiere a reviewer for The Guardian wrote: "it achieves the rare feat of being witty and erotic at the same time", and Curry gives a "garishly Bowiesque performance as the ambisextrous doctor."

=== Queer culture ===
Queer people comprised a large part of the Rocky Horror cult following; they identified with Furter's embrace of sexual liberation and androgyny, and attended show after show, slowly forming a community. Judith A. Peraino compares Brad and Janet's initiation into Frank N. Furter's world to the self-discovery of "queer identity", and to the traditional initiation of "virgins" in the shadow screenings. June Thomas describes the midnight screenings in Newark, Delaware as a "very queer scene", which increased visibility for the LGBTQ community: "The folks standing in line outside the State in fishnets and makeup every Saturday night undoubtedly widened the sphere of possibilities for gender expression on Main Street."

The Rocky Horror Picture Show remains a cultural phenomenon in both the US and UK. Cult film participants are often people on the fringe of society who find connection and community at the screenings, although the film attracts fans of differing backgrounds all over the world.

"Bisexuality, The Rocky Horror Picture Show, and Me", by Elizabeth Reba Weise, is part of the publication, Bi Any Other Name: Bisexual People Speak Out (1991), an anthology edited by Loraine Hutchins and Lani Kaʻahumanu about the history of the modern bisexual rights movement that is one of the first publications of bisexual literature.

=== Straight culture ===
Furter and The Rocky Horror Picture Show has been featured in a number of other feature films and television series over the years. Episodes of The Simpsons, The Venture Bros., Cold Case, Tuca & Bertie, The Boondocks, Glee, The Drew Carey Show, That '70s Show, Deutschland 86, Mickey Mouse Clubhouse, and American Dad! spotlight Rocky Horror, as do films such as Vice Squad (1982), Halloween II (2009), and The Perks of Being a Wallflower (2012).

The 1980 film Fame featured the audience reciting their callback lines to the screen and dancing the Time Warp, the dance from the stage show and film, which has become a novelty dance at parties.

Dr. Frank-N-Furter influenced the appearance of Emporio Ivankov, a bigender character from Eiichiro Oda's manga and anime series One Piece. Director Rob Zombie cited Rocky Horror as a major influence on his film House of 1000 Corpses (2003), while the film's fan culture of cosplaying and audience participation during screenings laid the groundwork for the similarly influential cult following surrounding Tommy Wiseau's The Room (2003). Rocky Horror also inspired John McPhail's zombie musical Anna and the Apocalypse (2018). Sabrina Carpenter's "Tears" music video takes inspiration from the film, with her portraying a character similar to Janet Weiss and actor Colman Domingo featured playing a drag tribute to Dr. Frank-N-Furter.

=== Cult following ===
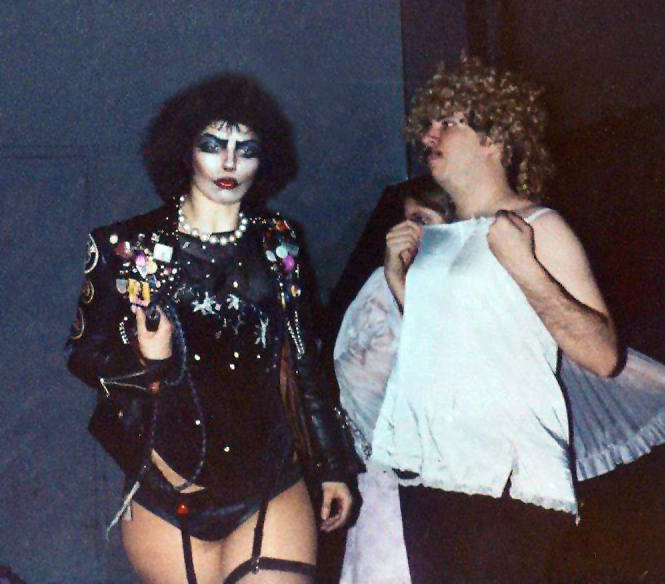
Dori Hartley cosplaying as Frank, with Sal Piro as Janet, at a 1977 showing of the film.

The Rocky Horror Picture Show helped shape conditions of cult film's transition from art-house to exploitation style. The film developed a cult following in 1976 at the Waverly Theatre in New York, which developed into a standardised ritual. According to J. Hoberman, author of Midnight Movies, it was after five months into the film's midnight run when lines began to be shouted by the audience. Louis Farese Jr., a normally quiet teacher, upon seeing the character Janet place a newspaper over her head to protect herself from rain, yelled, "Buy an umbrella, you cheap bitch." Originally, Louis and other Rocky Horror pioneers, including Amy Lazarus, Theresa Krakauskas, and Bill O'Brian, did this to entertain each other, each week trying to come up with something new to make each other laugh. This quickly caught on with other theatre-goers and thus began this self-proclaimed "counter point dialogue", which became standard practice and was repeated nearly verbatim at each screening. Performance groups became a staple at Rocky Horror screenings due in part to the prominent New York City fan cast. The New York City cast was originally run by former schoolteacher and stand-up comic Sal Piro and his friend Dori Hartley, the latter of whom portrayed Dr. Frank N. Furter and was one of several performers, including Will Kohler as Brad Majors, Nora Poses as Janet, and Lilias Piro as Magenta, in a flexible rotating cast. The performances of the audience were scripted and actively discouraged improvising, being conformist in a similar way to the repressed characters.

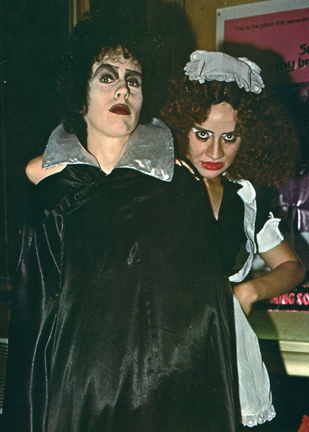
D. Garrett Gafford as Frank alongside Terri Hardin as Magenta at a 1978 film screening.

On Halloween in 1976, people attended in costume and talked back to the screen, and by mid-1978, Rocky Horror was playing in over 50 locations on Fridays and Saturdays at midnight. Newsletters were published by local performance groups, and fans gathered for Rocky Horror conventions. By the end of 1979, there were twice-weekly showings at over 230 theatres. The National Fan Club was established in 1977 and later merged with the International Fan Club. The fan publication The Transylvanian printed a number of issues, and a semi-regular poster magazine was published as well as an official magazine.

Performance groups in the Los Angeles area originated at the Fox Theatre in 1977, where Michael Wolfson won a look-alike contest as Frank N. Furter, and won another at the Tiffany Theater on Sunset Boulevard. Wolfson's group eventually performed in all of the L.A. area theatres screening Rocky Horror, including the Balboa Theater in Balboa, The Cove at Hermosa Beach, and The Sands in Glendale. He was invited to perform at the Sombrero Playhouse in Phoenix, Arizona. At the Tiffany Theatre, the audience performance cast had the theatre's full cooperation; the local performers entered early and without charge. The fan playing Frank for this theatre was a transgender performer, D. Garret Gafford, who was out of work in 1978 and trying to raise the funds for a gender reassignment while spending the weekends performing at the Tiffany.

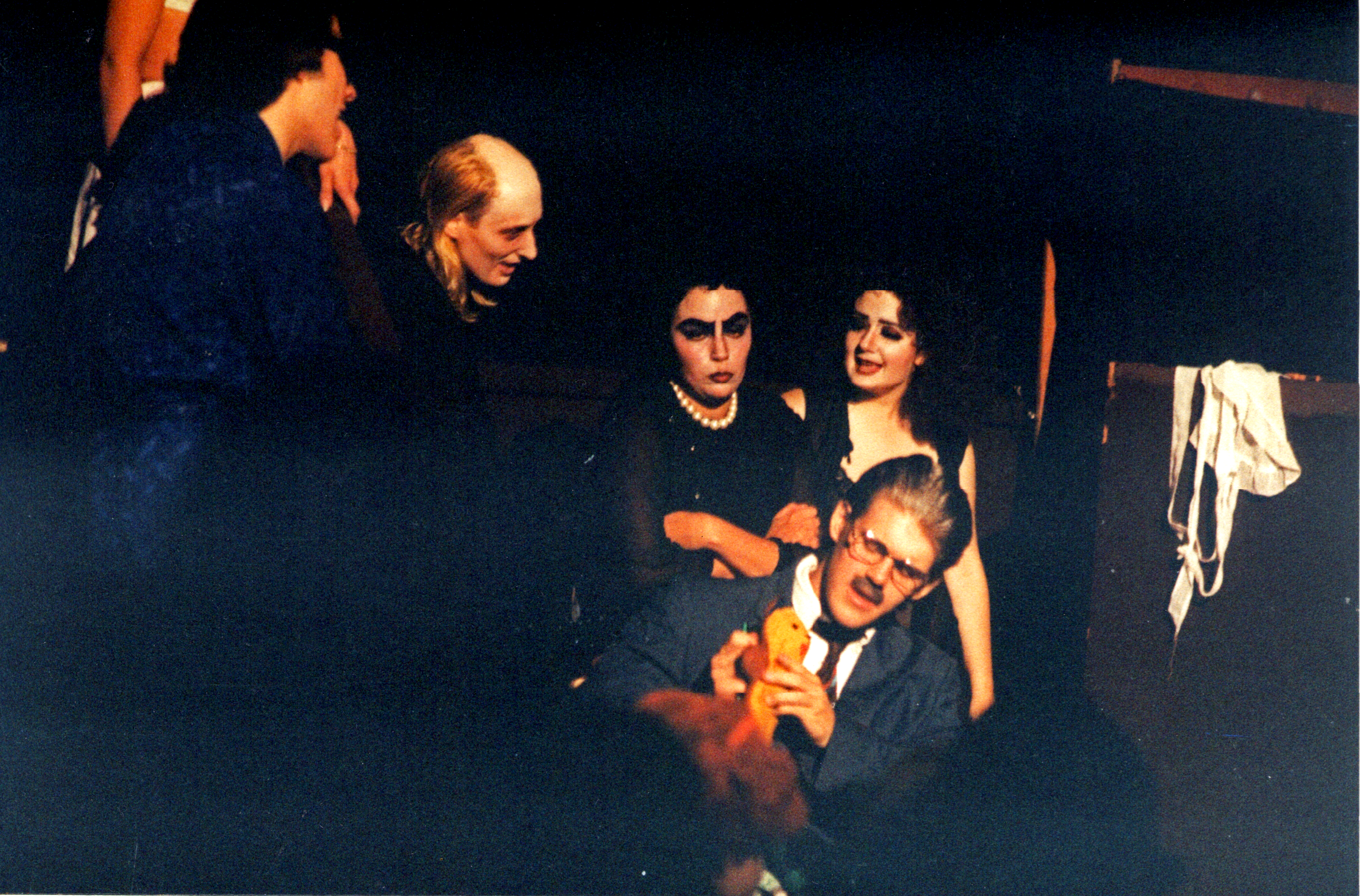
San Francisco's Strand Theatre, 1979. Marni Scofidio, second from right, portrays Frank.

By 1978, Rocky Horror had moved from an earlier San Francisco location to the Strand Theatre located near the Tenderloin on Market Street. The performance group there, Double Feature/Celluloid Jam, was the first to act out and perform almost the entire film, unlike the New York cast at that time. The Strand cast was put together from former members of an early Berkeley group, disbanded due to less than enthusiastic management. Frank N. Furter was portrayed by Marni Scofidio, who, in 1979, attracted many of the older performers from Berkeley. Other members included Mishell Erickson as Columbia, her twin sister Denise Erickson as Magenta, Kathy Dolan as Janet, and Linda "Lou" Woods as Riff Raff. The Strand group performed at two large science fiction conventions in Los Angeles and San Francisco, were offered a spot at The Mabuhay, a local punk club, and performed for children's television of Argentina.

=== Legacy ===
On the 50th anniversary of the musical in 2023, BBC News states that since debuting in London in 1973 the "production has been performed in 20 different languages" and been "seen by 30 million people globally".

In 2025, the film celebrated its 50-year anniversary. Celebratory events in Los Angeles included a talk at the Academy Museum which included the attendance of Tim Curry and a screening and fan-centered event at the Roxy.

Following Tim Curry's 2026 death, The New York Times praised Tim Curry's portrayal of Frank-N-Furter, noting he was most associated with the role which gave him a reputation as having a "gift for garish eccentricity" while also noting that Curry’s portrayal of Furter led to a career in which he was a "favorite in roles calling for expressive villainy or general cartoonishness". CNN called Curry a "massively popular cult figure" for his horror film appearances. Rolling Stone also called Curry a "genuine pop-culture icon" who had "assured a place in cinema-history books". The Times of India and the Los Angeles Times similarly called both Curry and Furter a pop culture icon in their obituaries.

== See also ==
- Queer icon
- List of breakout characters
- Lists of fictional extraterrestrial species and races
