= Time Warp (song) =

Song from The Rocky Horror Picture Show

- South African single A-side label

Song by: Richard O'Brien; Patricia Quinn; Nell Campbell; Charles Gray

from the album The Rocky Horror Picture Show
- Released: 1975
- Genre: Glam rock; rock and roll
- Length: 3:18
- Composers: Richard O'Brien, Richard Hartley
- Lyricist: Richard O'Brien

"Time Warp" is a song featured in the 1973 rock musical The Rocky Horror Show, its 1975 film adaptation The Rocky Horror Picture Show, and the 2016 TV production The Rocky Horror Picture Show: Let's Do the Time Warp Again. The song title comes from a dance performed during the pre-chorus of the song.

== Composition and lyrics ==
The song is both an example and a parody of the dance song genre, with much of its lyrics consisting of instructions for performing the dance. (Example: "It's just a jump to the left / And then a step to the right / Put your hands on your hips / Bring your knees in tight.")

This dance became one of the major audience participation activities during screenings of the 1975 film The Rocky Horror Picture Show and live performances of the original 1973 stage production The Rocky Horror Show.

The song is a glam rock and rock and roll song. It is written by Richard O'Brien and Richard Hartley.

== Placement ==
The choreography for "Time Warp"

"Time Warp" was the fifth song in the original stage show (after "Science Fiction/Double Feature", "Dammit Janet", "Over at the Frankenstein Place" and "Sweet Transvestite") where it was performed by Riff-Raff (Richard O'Brien), Magenta (Patricia Quinn), Columbia (Nell Campbell) and the Narrator (Jonathan Adams), but fourth in the film (following "Over at the Frankenstein Place" and preceding "Sweet Transvestite"). O'Brien, Quinn and Campbell reprised their roles from the stage production in the film but the Narrator, now renamed the Criminologist, was instead played by Charles Gray. In the 2016 TV production, The Rocky Horror Picture Show: Let's Do the Time-Warp Again, the number was performed by Reeve Carney (Riff-Raff), Christina Milian (Magenta), Annaleigh Ashford (Columbia) and Tim Curry (the Criminologist).

Stage productions continued to use the original placement until Richard O'Brien revised the script for the 1990 West End revival in which he moved the song to the film's placement. For reasons of pacing, most productions now follow this order.

The song is reprised briefly at the end of the film, in flashback, and in the stage show it serves as an encore led by Dr. Frank N. Furter (played by Tim Curry in the original stage production and film).

== Charts ==
=== Weekly charts ===
Original Australian cast recording
Chart (1977)	Peak position
Australia (Kent Music Report)	85

The Rocky Horror Picture Show
Chart (1980–81)	Peak position
Australia (Kent Music Report)	3
Canada (RPM Top Singles)	12
Europe (Euro Digital Songs) (Billboard)	16
France	20
UK (UK Singles Chart)	13
U.S. (Billboard) (Hot 100)	29

=== Year-end charts ===
Chart (1980)	Position
Australia (Kent Music Report)	66
Chart (1981)	Position
Australia (Kent Music Report)	27

== Certifications ==
Region	Certification	Certified units/sales
United Kingdom (BPI)	Silver	200,000^{‡}
^{‡} Sales+streaming figures based on certification alone.

== Other appearances and versions ==
Time Warp was used as a jingle as "Let's do the Kodak Express", for Kodak Express commercials in the late 1980s and early 1990s.

The Hillywood Show used the song in a 2014 Doctor Who parody, which actor David Tennant (who portrayed the Tenth and Fourteenth Doctors on the series) called "extraordinary".

In the S1E9 of the English dub of The Iceblade Sorcerer Shall Rule the World, Carol makes the Grim Reapers dance the Time Warp.

The comedy rock duo Tenacious D released a cover of the song on October 6, 2020 for Rock the Vote, and is often played on alternative rock radio stations on or around Halloween.
