= Sweet Transvestite =

1973 song from The Rocky Horror Picture Show

Song by Tim Curry

from the album The Rocky Horror Picture Show
- Released: 1973
- Genre: Glam rock
- Length: 3:24
- Label: Ode Records (US), UK Records (UK)
- Composers: Richard O'Brien, Richard Hartley
- Lyricist: Richard O'Brien

"Sweet Transvestite" is a song from the 1973 British musical stage production The Rocky Horror Show and its 1975 film counterpart The Rocky Horror Picture Show. The song is performed by the character, Dr. Frank-N-Furter, originally played by Tim Curry. The book, music and lyrics are by Richard O'Brien and the musical arrangements by Richard Hartley. It is in the key of E major.

It was originally the fourth song in the musical but it was later switched with its following number, "Time Warp", so that the latter came before Dr. Frank N. Furter's entrance.

== Overview ==
The song, written and composed by Richard O'Brien and Richard Hartley, is described as "the first big, glam rock aria of the musical". It is performed by the character, Dr. Frank N. Furter, originated on stage and screen by actor Tim Curry, who performed it in the original 1973 London production The Rocky Horror Show followed by Los Angeles and New York City.

It introduces the character of Dr. Frank N. Furter to the audience and Brad Majors and Janet Weiss. Surrounded by his servants Riff Raff, Magenta, and Columbia, he boasts where he is from, what he is, what he has been doing and why he does it. The song is one of the 1975 film The Rocky Horror Picture Show and stage show's most famous and includes one of the show's most notorious lines, "I'm just a sweet transvestite from Transsexual, Transylvania". Later references in the film explain that it is not the Transylvania region of Europe, but instead a galaxy by that name, and that Transsexual is Frank's (as well as secondary characters Magenta and Riff-Raff's) home planet. Frank makes a passing reference in the lyrics to "a Steve Reeves movie;" O'Brien noted that he had a love for Reeves's films and incorporated that into the show.

== Covers ==
There have been various covers of the song from different casts of the musical around the world. Notable versions of "Sweet Transvestite" have been recorded by Anthony Head (in Rocky Horror Show Live from London's Playhouse Theatre on 17 September 2015), Mina, Bates Motel, Trevor Byfield, The Steve Whitney Band, TSOL with Keith Morris, and punk rock band Apocalypse Hoboken on the 2003 tribute compilation The Rocky Horror Punk Rock Show. The song was sung by Mercedes Jones (Amber Riley) in the 2010 season 2 episode of Glee, "The Rocky Horror Glee Show". In Fox's 2016 televised tribute, The Rocky Horror Picture Show: Let's Do the Time Warp Again, the song was performed by actress Laverne Cox, who played the role of Dr. Frank N. Furter.

Currently, the musical is having its 2026 Broadway revival, featuring Luke Evans as Dr. Frank N. Furter.
