= The Rocky Horror Picture Show =

1975 musical comedy horror film by Jim Sharman

- Theatrical release poster
- Directed by: Jim Sharman
- Screenplay by: Richard O'Brien; Jim Sharman
- Based on: The Rocky Horror Show by Richard O'Brien
- Produced by: Lou Adler; Michael White
- Starring: Tim Curry; Susan Sarandon; Barry Bostwick; Richard O'Brien; Patricia Quinn; Nell Campbell; Jonathan Adams; Meat Loaf; Peter Hinwood; Charles Gray
- Narrated by: Charles Gray
- Cinematography: Peter Suschitzky
- Edited by: Graeme Clifford
- Music by: Richard Hartley; Richard O'Brien (songs)
- Production company: Michael White Productions
- Distributed by: Fox-Rank Distributors (United Kingdom); 20th Century Fox (United States)
- Release dates: 14 August 1975 (United Kingdom); 26 September 1975 (United States)
- Running time: 100 minutes
- Countries: United Kingdom; United States
- Language: English
- Budget: $1.4 million
- Box office: $170 million

The Rocky Horror Picture Show is a 1975 musical comedy horror film produced by Lou Adler and Michael White, directed by Jim Sharman, and distributed by 20th Century Fox. The film is based on the 1973 musical stage production The Rocky Horror Show, with music, book and lyrics by Richard O'Brien. The screenplay was written by Sharman and O'Brien, with O'Brien also playing the supporting role Riff Raff. The production is a tribute to the science fiction and horror B movies of the 1930s through to the early 1960s. The film stars Tim Curry (in his film debut), Susan Sarandon and Barry Bostwick. It is narrated by Charles Gray, with cast members from the original Royal Court Theatre, Roxy Theatre and Belasco Theatre productions, including Nell Campbell and Patricia Quinn.

The story centres on a young engaged couple whose car breaks down in the rain near a castle, where they search for help. The castle is occupied by strangers in elaborate costumes holding a party. They then meet the head of the house, Dr. Frank-N-Furter, a mad scientist and alien transvestite from the planet Transsexual in the galaxy of Transylvania, who creates a living muscle man named Rocky. The film was shot in the United Kingdom at Bray Studios and on location at Oakley Court, a country house best known for its earlier use by Hammer Film Productions. A number of props and set pieces were reused from the Hammer horror films. Although the film is both a parody of and tribute to many kitsch science fiction and horror films, costume designer Sue Blane conducted no research for her designs. Blane has claimed that her creations for the film directly affected the development of punk rock fashion trends, such as torn fishnet stockings and colourfully dyed hair.

Initially the film was largely ignored by critics, but it soon became a hit as a midnight movie, when audiences began participating with the film at the Waverly Theater in New York City in 1976. Audience members returned frequently to the cinemas, where they talked back to the screen and began dressing as the characters, spawning similar performance groups across the United States. At almost the same time, fans in costume began performing alongside the film. This "shadow-cast" mimed the actions on screen, above and behind them, while lip-synching their characters' lines.

The film is usually shown close to Halloween. Still in limited release in 2026, 51 years after its premiere, it is the longest-running theatrical release in film history. In many cities, live amateur shadow-casts act out the film as it is being shown and draw heavily upon a tradition of audience participation. The film has a large international cult following, and is regarded by many as one of the greatest musical films of all time. In 2005, The Rocky Horror Picture Show was selected by the Library of Congress for preservation in the United States National Film Registry as being "culturally, historically, or aesthetically significant".

== Plot ==
The film begins with a pair of floating disembodied lips welcoming the audience to a science fiction double feature ("Science Fiction/Double Feature"). Throughout the film, a criminologist from an unspecified point in the future narrates and provides commentary on the events.

Following the wedding of their friends, a naïve young couple, Brad Majors and Janet Weiss, get engaged and decide to celebrate with their high-school science teacher Dr. Scott, who taught the class where they first met ("Dammit Janet"). En route to Scott's house on a dark and rainy night, they get lost and suffer a flat tyre. Seeking a telephone to call for help, the couple walks to a nearby castle ("Over at the Frankenstein Place") where a party is being held. They are accepted in by the strangely dressed inhabitants, led by the butler Riff Raff, the maid Magenta and a groupie named Columbia, who dance to "The Time Warp". Dr. Frank-N-Furter, a transvestite mad scientist, introduces himself and invites them to stay for the night ("Sweet Transvestite").

With the help of Riff Raff, Frank brings to life a tall, muscular, handsome blond man named Rocky ("The Sword of Damocles"). As Frank vows he can improve Rocky into an ideal man in a week ("I Can Make You a Man"), Eddie, a motorcyclist with a bandaged head, breaks out of a deep freeze ("Hot Patootie – Bless My Soul"). Frank kills Eddie with an ice axe, justifying it as a "mercy killing". Rocky and Frank depart for the bridal suite ("I Can Make You a Man (Reprise)").

Brad and Janet are shown to separate bedrooms, where Frank visits and seduces each one disguised as the other. Meanwhile, Riff Raff torments Rocky, who flees the suite. Janet, having learned of Brad's dalliance with Frank, discovers Rocky cowering in his birth tank. While tending to his wounds, Janet seduces Rocky as Magenta and Columbia watch from their bedroom monitor ("Touch-a, Touch-a, Touch-a, Touch Me").

Dr. Scott, now a government investigator of UFOs, comes to the castle in search of his nephew Eddie, who sent him a letter implying part of his brain was removed by aliens. Everyone discovers Janet and Rocky together, enraging Frank. Magenta summons everyone to an uncomfortable dinner, which they soon realise has been prepared from Eddie's mutilated remains ("Eddie"). In the chaos, Janet runs screaming into Rocky's arms, provoking a jealous Frank to chase her through the halls to the lab, where he uses his Medusa Transducer to turn Dr. Scott, Brad, Janet, Rocky and Columbia into nude statues ("Planet Schmanet Janet"/"Wise Up Janet Weiss"/"Planet Hotdog").

After dressing the statues in cabaret costumes, Frank "unfreezes" them and leads them in a live cabaret floor show, complete with an RKO tower and a swimming pool ("Rose Tint My World"/"Don't Dream It, Be It"/"Wild and Untamed Thing"). Riff Raff and Magenta interrupt and announce that due to Frank's extravagance, they are declaring mutiny and returning to their home planet of Transsexual, Transylvania. Frank mistakenly assumes that he will come with them ("I'm Going Home"), but Riff Raff announces that he will kill him instead. He shoots the loudly crying Columbia with an antimatter laser and then Frank. An enraged Rocky climbs the tower with Frank's body as Riff Raff shoots him several times with the laser, but it does not work on him. When they climb too high, the tower collapses and Rocky plunges to his death in the pool. The castle lifts off into space, and Brad, Janet and Dr. Scott are left crawling in the smog and dirt, confused and disorientated, as the criminologist concludes that the human race is equivalent to insects crawling on the planet's surface: "lost in time, and lost in space ... and meaning" ("Super Heroes").

== Cast ==
- Tim Curry as Dr. Frank-N-Furter, a transvestite alien scientist
- Susan Sarandon as Janet Weiss, Brad's fiancée
- Barry Bostwick as Brad Majors, Janet's fiancé
- Richard O'Brien as Riff Raff, a hunchbacked handyman and Magenta's brother
- Patricia Quinn as Magenta, a domestic servant and Riff Raff's sister
- Little Nell as Columbia, a groupie
- Jonathan Adams as Dr. Everett V. Scott, Frank's rival scientist
- Peter Hinwood as Rocky Horror, Frank's creation
  - Trevor White is uncredited as Rocky's singing voice
- Meat Loaf as Eddie, a former delivery boy
- Charles Gray as the criminologist, an expert

Jeremy Newson and Hilary Labow play Brad and Janet's newlywed friends Ralph and Betty Hapschatt. The guests at both the Hapschatt wedding and Frank's convention consist of Perry Bedden, Christopher Biggins, Gaye Brown, Ishaq Bux, Stephen Calcutt, Hugh Cecil, Imogen Claire, Tony Cowan, Sadie Corré, Fran Fullenwider, Lindsay Ingram, Peggy Ledger, Annabel Leventon, Anthony Milner, Pamela Obermeyer, Tony Then, Kimi Wong and Henry Woolf, as well as an uncredited Rufus Collins.

== Production ==
=== Concept and development ===
Little Nell, Patricia Quinn, Tim Curry and Richard O'Brien in The Rocky Horror Picture Show. All were in the original stage show.

Richard O'Brien was living as an unemployed actor in London during the early 1970s. He wrote most of The Rocky Horror Show during one winter just to occupy himself. Since his youth, O'Brien had loved science fiction and B horror movies. He wanted to combine elements of the unintentional humour of B horror movies, portentous dialogue of schlock-horror, Steve Reeves muscle flicks and fifties rock and roll into his musical. O'Brien conceived and wrote the play set against the backdrop of the glam era that had manifested itself in British popular culture in the 1970s. Allowing his concept to come into being, O'Brien states "glam rock allowed me to be myself more".

O'Brien showed a portion of the unfinished script to Australian director Jim Sharman, who decided to direct it at the small experimental space Upstairs at the Royal Court Theatre in Sloane Square, Chelsea, London, which was used as a project space for new work. O'Brien had appeared briefly in a stage production of Andrew Lloyd Webber's Jesus Christ Superstar, directed by Sharman, and the two also worked together in Sam Shepard's The Unseen Hand. Sharman would bring in production designer Brian Thomson. The original creative team was then rounded out by costume designer Sue Blane, musical director Richard Hartley, and stage producer Michael White, who was brought in to produce. As the musical went into rehearsal, the working title, They Came from Denton High, was changed just before previews at the suggestion of Sharman to The Rocky Horror Show.

Having premiered in the small 60-seat Royal Court Theatre, it quickly moved to larger venues in London, transferring to the 230-seat Chelsea Classic Cinema on King's Road on 14 August 1973, before finding a quasi-permanent home at the 500-seat King's Road Theatre from 3 November that year, running for six years. The musical made its US debut in Los Angeles in 1974 before playing in New York City as well as other cities. Producer and Ode Records owner Lou Adler attended the London production in the winter of 1973, escorted by friend Britt Ekland. He immediately decided to purchase the US theatrical rights. His production would be staged at his Roxy Theatre in L.A. In 1975, The Rocky Horror Show premiered on Broadway at the 1,000-seat Belasco Theatre.

=== Filming and locations ===
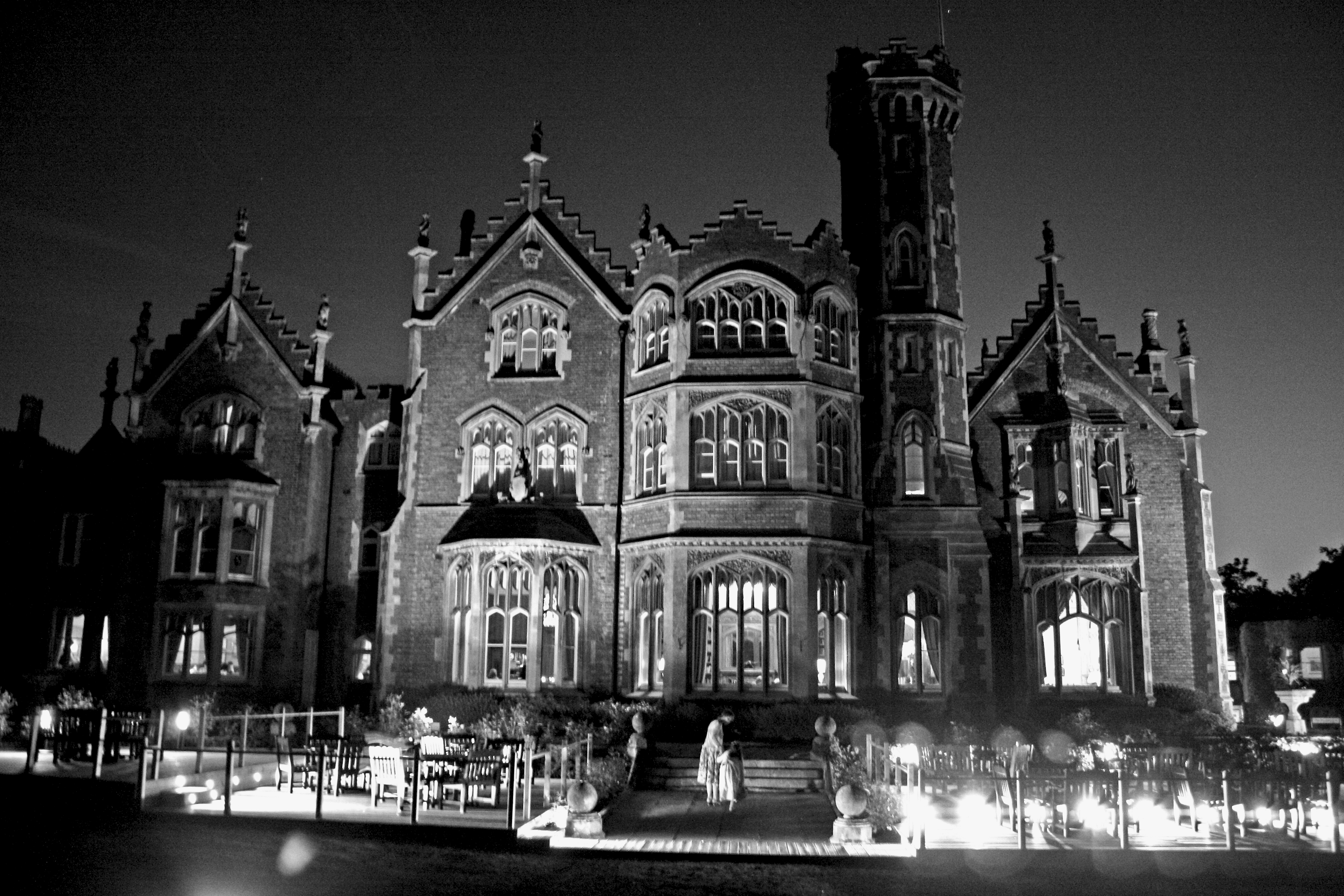
Oakley Court

Set in the fictional town of Denton, the film was shot at Bray Studios and Oakley Court, a country house near Maidenhead, Berkshire, England and at Elstree Studios for post-production, from 21 October to 19 December 1974. Oakley Court, built in 1857 in the Victorian Gothic style, is known for a number of Hammer films. Much of the location shooting took place there, although at the time the manor was not in good condition. Most of the cast were from the original London stage production, including Tim Curry, who had decided that Dr Frank N. Furter should speak like the Queen of the United Kingdom, extravagantly posh. Fox insisted on casting the two characters of Brad and Janet with American actors, Barry Bostwick and Susan Sarandon. Filming took place during autumn, which made conditions worse. During filming, Sarandon fell ill with pneumonia. Filming of the laboratory scene and the title character's creation occurred on 30 October 1974.

The film is both a parody and tribute to many of the science fiction and horror movies from the 1930s up to the 1970s. The film production retains many aspects from the stage version, such as production design and music, but adds new scenes not featured in the original stage play. The film's plot, setting and style echo those of the Hammer horror films, which had their own instantly recognisable style (just as Universal Studios' horror films did). The originally proposed opening sequence was to contain clips of various films mentioned in the lyrics, as well as the first few sequences shot in black and white, but this was deemed too expensive and scrapped.

=== Costumes, make-up and props ===
In the stage productions, actors generally did their own make-up; however, for the film, the producers chose Pierre La Roche, who had previously been a make-up artist for Mick Jagger and David Bowie, to redesign the make-up for each character. Production stills were taken by rock photographer Mick Rock, who has published a number of books from his work. In Rocky Horror: From Concept to Cult, designer Sue Blane discusses the Rocky Horror costumes' influence on punk music style, opining "[It was a] big part of the build-up [to punk]." She states that ripped fishnet stockings, glitter and coloured hair were directly attributable to Rocky Horror.

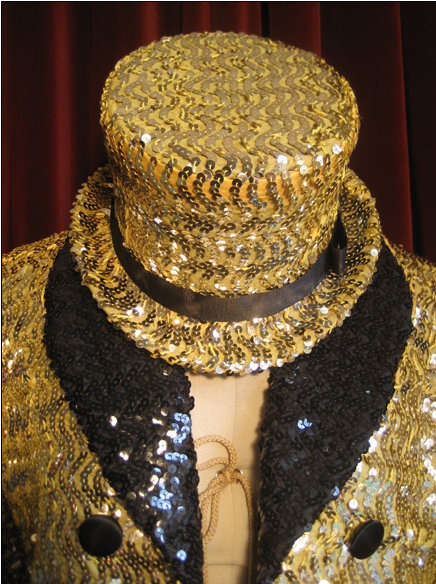
A fan-made replica of Little Nell's gold sequined swallow-tail coat

Some of the costumes from the film had been originally used in the stage production. Props and set pieces were reused from old Hammer Horror productions and others. The tank and dummy used for Rocky's birth originally appeared in The Revenge of Frankenstein (1958). These references to earlier productions, in addition to cutting costs, enhanced the cult status of the film.

Costume designer Sue Blane was not keen on working for the film, until she became aware that Curry, an old friend, was committed to the project. Curry and Blane had worked together in Glasgow's Citizens Theatre in a production of The Maids, for which Curry had worn a woman's corset. Blane arranged for the theatre to loan her the corset from the other production for Rocky Horror. Blane admits that she did not conduct research for her designing, had never seen a science fiction film and is acutely aware that her costumes for Brad and Janet may have been generalisations.

When I designed Rocky, I never looked at any science fiction movies or comic books. One just automatically knows what spacesuits look like, the same way one intuitively knows how Americans dress. I had never been to the United States, but I had this fixed idea of how people looked there. Americans wore polyester so their clothes wouldn't crease, and their trousers were a bit too short. Since they're very keen on sports, white socks and white T-shirts played an integral part in their wardrobe. Of course, since doing Rocky I have been to the United States and admit it was a bit of a generalization, but my ideas worked perfectly for Brad and Janet.

The budget for the film was US$1,600,000, far more than the stage production budget, but having to double up on costumes for the film production was expensive. For filming, corsets for the finale had to be doubled for the pool scene, with one version drying while the other was worn on set. While many of the costumes are exact replicas from the stage productions, other costumes were new to filming, such as Columbia's gold sequined swallow-tail coat and top hat and Magenta's maid's uniform.

Blane was amazed by the recreation and understanding of her designs by fans. When she first heard that people were dressing up, she thought it would be tacky, but was surprised to see the depth to which the fans went to recreate her designs. Rocky Horror fan Mina Credeur, who designs costumes and performed as Columbia for Houston's performance group, states that "the best part is when everyone leaves with a big smile on their face," noting that there's "such a kitschiness and campiness that it seems to be winking at you." The film still plays at many theatre locations.

=== Title sequence ===
The film starts with the screen fading to black and oversized, disembodied female lips appear overdubbed with a male voice, establishing the theme of androgyny to be repeated as the film unfolds. The opening scene and song, "Science Fiction/Double Feature", consists of the lips of Patricia Quinn (who appears in the film later as the character Magenta and as 'Trixie the Usherette' in the original London production, where she also sings the song) but has the vocals of actor and Rocky Horror creator, Richard O'Brien (who appears as Magenta's brother Riff Raff). The lyrics refer to science fiction and horror films of the past and list several film titles from the 1930s to the 1960s, including The Day the Earth Stood Still (1951), Flash Gordon (1936), The Invisible Man (1933), King Kong (1933), It Came from Outer Space (1953), Doctor X (1932), Forbidden Planet (1956), Tarantula (1955), The Day of the Triffids (1962), Curse of the Demon (1957) and When Worlds Collide (1951).

== Music ==
The soundtrack was released in 1975 by Ode Records and produced by English composer Richard Hartley. The album peaked at No. 49 on the US Billboard 200 in 1978. It reached No. 12 on the Australian albums chart and No. 11 on the New Zealand albums chart. The album is described as the "definitive version of the [Rocky Horror] score".

1. "Science Fiction/Double Feature" – The Lips (those of Patricia Quinn; voice of Richard O'Brien)
2. "Dammit Janet" – Brad, Janet and Chorus
3. "Over at the Frankenstein Place" – Janet, Brad, Riff Raff and Chorus
4. "The Time Warp" – Riff Raff, Magenta, The Criminologist, Columbia and Transylvanians
5. "Sweet Transvestite" – Frank with spoken lyrics by Brad and Janet
6. "The Sword of Damocles" – Rocky and Transylvanians
7. "I Can Make You a Man" – Frank and Transylvanians
8. "Hot Patootie – Bless My Soul" – Eddie and Transylvanians
9. "I Can Make You a Man (Reprise)" – Frank, Janet and Transylvanians
10. "Touch-a, Touch-a, Touch-a, Touch Me" – Janet with Magenta, Columbia, Rocky, Brad, Frank and Riff Raff
11. "Once in a While" (deleted scene) – Brad
12. "Eddie" – Dr. Scott, The Criminologist, Janet, Columbia and Frank
13. "Planet Schmanet Janet (Wise Up Janet Weiss)" – Frank with one line by Janet
14. "Planet Hot Dog" – Frank, Brad, Dr. Scott and Janet
15. "Rose Tint My World" – Columbia, Rocky, Brad and Janet
16. "Fanfare/Don't Dream It, Be It" – Frank with Dr. Scott, Brad and Janet
17. "Wild and Untamed Thing" – Frank with Brad, Janet, Rocky, Columbia and Riff Raff
18. "I'm Going Home" – Frank and Chorus
19. "Super Heroes" (only present in full in the original UK release) – Brad, Janet, The Criminologist and Chorus
20. "Science Fiction/Double Feature (Reprise)" – The Lips

== Release ==
London release poster for 14 August 1975 premiere

=== Theatrical ===
The film opened in the United Kingdom at the Rialto Theatre in London on 14 August 1975 and in the United States on 26 September at the UA Westwood in Los Angeles. It did well in Los Angeles, but not elsewhere in the U.S., and the film was withdrawn from its eight opening U.S. cities, and its planned New York City opening on Halloween night was cancelled. Fox re-released the film around college campuses on a double-bill with another rock music film parody, Brian De Palma's Phantom of the Paradise (1974), but again it drew small audiences.

The "Lips" poster, a parody of the poster for Jaws (1975)

A second film poster was created using a set of red lipstick-painted lips with the tagline "A Different Set of Jaws", a spoof of the poster for the film Jaws (which was also released in 1975). The lips of former Playboy model Lorelei Shark are featured on the poster.

With Pink Flamingos (1972) and Reefer Madness (1936) making money in midnight showings nationwide, a Fox executive, Tim Deegan, was able to talk distributors into midnight screenings, starting in New York City on April Fools' Day of 1976. It was also the "Secret" film, on 20 May, in the first Seattle International Film Festival. The cult following started shortly after the film began its midnight run at the Waverly Theater in New York City, then spread to other places in New York State and beyond. Rocky Horror played not only in the larger cities but throughout the United States, and in some theatres attendees were admitted free if they arrived in costume. A live performance under the film was organised with the release in New Orleans, as well as in such U.S. cities as Pittsburgh and Chicago (at the Biograph Theater).

In St. Louis, the Varsity Theatre began showing Rocky Horror in March 1976 as its main feature for three weeks. Owner Pete Piccione brought it back as a midnight movie on weekends through 1976 and 1977. By mid-1978, the Varsity was running Rocky Horror every weekend at midnight, and by May 1979 it had logged at least 60 consecutive weekends; the run continued until the theatre closed in January 1988. Before long, nearly every screening of the film was accompanied by a live performance by a cast of fans.

The Rocky Horror Picture Show is considered to be the longest-running release in film history. It benefited from a 20th Century Fox policy that made archival films available to theatres at any time. Having never been pulled by 20th Century Fox from its original 1975 release, it continues to play in cinemas. After The Walt Disney Company acquired 20th Century Fox in 2019 and began withdrawing archival Fox movies from theatres to be placed into the Disney Vault, the company made an exception in the case of The Rocky Horror Picture Show to allow the traditional midnight screenings to continue.

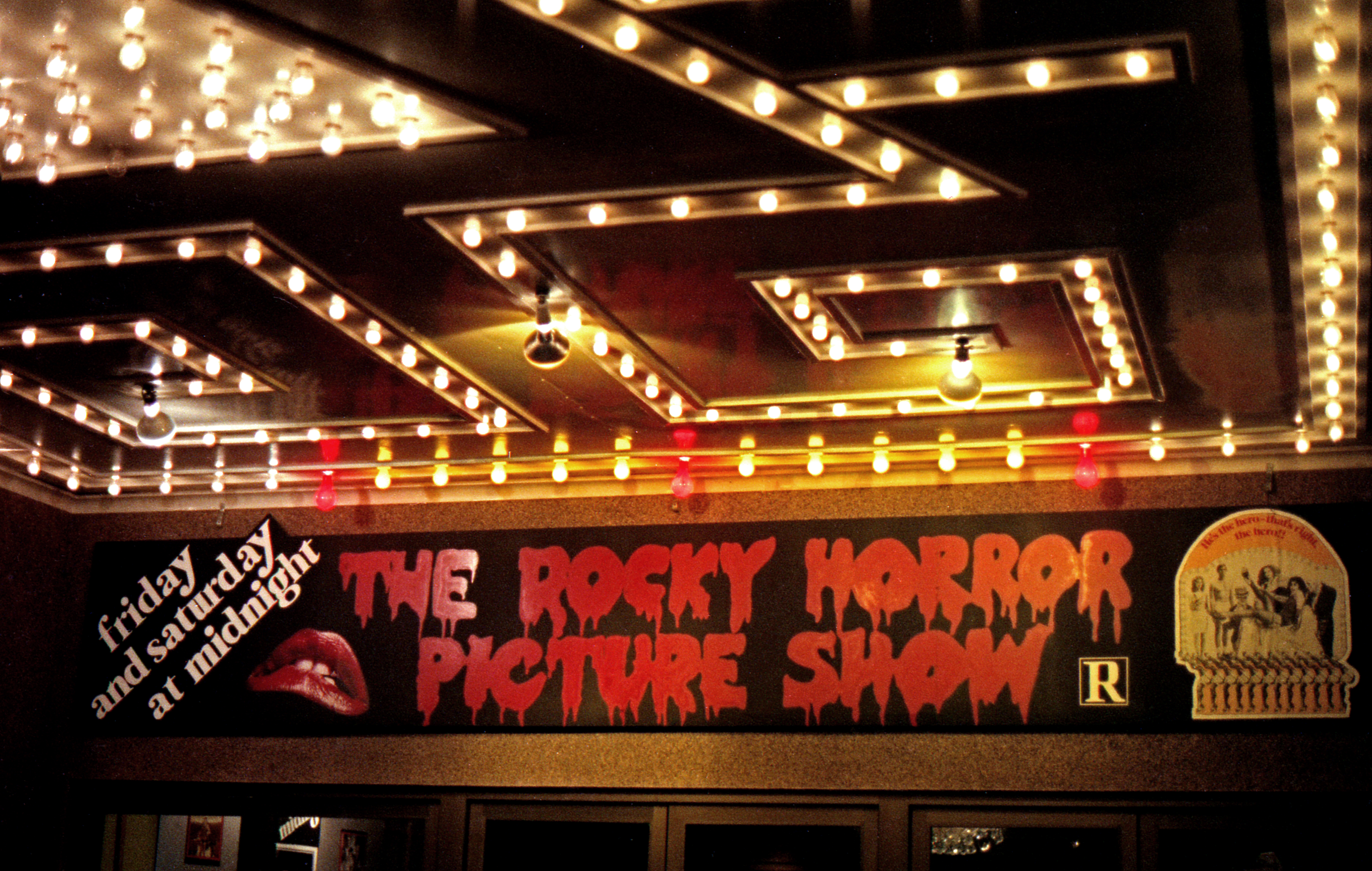
19 January 1978, opening at the UA Cinema, Merced, California

To commemorate the film's 50th anniversary, a new 4K remaster of the film, resulting from a 10-month restoration effort by the Walt Disney Studios Restoration Team, was released in theatres in 2025 by 20th Century Studios, with screenings taking place both at midnight and during the day. Disney's Restoration & Library Management director Kevin Schaeffer described the new version of the film as a way "to honor its bold, genre-defying spirit and ensure that audiences – both longtime fans and first-time viewers – can experience it as it was originally intended, with stunning picture and sound." Adler added "What began as a small, rebellious project has become a global celebration of individuality, community, and creative freedom. This anniversary is a tribute to the fans who kept it alive and kicking all these years."

=== Home media ===
A Super 8 version of selected scenes of the film was made available. In 1983, Ode Records released The Rocky Horror Picture Show, Audience Par-Tic-I-Pation Album, recorded at the 8th Street Playhouse. The recording consisted of the film's audio and the standardised call-backs from the audience. A home video release was made available in 1987 in the UK. In the US, the film (including documentary footage and extras) was released on VHS on 8 November 1990, retailing for $89.95. The film received two separate US LaserDisc releases in 1992 and 1997, with the film also being released on LaserDisc in France, Germany and Japan during the 1990s.

20th Century Fox Home Entertainment released a DVD in the US on 23 October 2000, for the film's 25th anniversary. This one is a THX certified two-disc set that features the original theatrical version and an extended version. In Australia (Region 4) it was released on DVD in 2002, by 20th Century Fox Home Entertainment South Pacific, while in the UK (Region 2) it was released on DVD on 14 February 2001. A 35th anniversary edition Blu-ray was released by 20th Century Fox Home Entertainment in the US on 19 October 2010. The disc includes a newly created 7.1 surround sound mix, the original theatrical mono sound mix and a 4K/2K image transfer from the original camera negative. In addition, new content featuring karaoke and a fan performance were included.

A 45th anniversary edition Blu-ray was released in September 2020 by Walt Disney Studios Home Entertainment under the 20th Century Home Entertainment label. In October 2021, the film was added to Disney+ on the Star hub for users in locations such as the UK, Ireland and Canada. For the film's 50th anniversary, film was released on 4K Ultra HD Blu-ray on 7 October 2025 by Sony Pictures Home Entertainment under licence from Disney.

== Reception ==
=== Critical reception ===
Chicago Sun-Times critic Roger Ebert noted that when first released, The Rocky Horror Picture Show was "ignored by pretty much everyone, including the future fanatics who would eventually count the hundreds of times they'd seen it". He considered it more a "long-running social phenomenon" than a movie, rating it 2.5 out of 4 stars and describing Curry as "the best thing in the movie, maybe because he seems to be having the most fun" but thinking the story would work better performed on stage for a live audience. Bill Henkin noted that Variety thought that the "campy hijinks" of the film seemed "labored", and also mentioned that the San Francisco Chronicle's John Wasserman, who had liked the stage play in London, found the film "lacking both charm and dramatic impact". Newsweek, in 1978, called the film "tasteless, plotless and pointless".

Review aggregator website Rotten Tomatoes gives the film a rating of 82% based on 55 reviews, and an average grade of 7.2/10, with the critical consensus reading "The Rocky Horror Picture Show brings its quirky characters in tight, but it's the narrative thrust that really drives audiences insane and keeps 'em doing the time warp again". A number of contemporary critics find it compelling and enjoyable because of its offbeat and bizarre qualities; the BBC summarised: "for those willing to experiment with something a little bit different, a little bit outré, The Rocky Horror Picture Show has a lot to offer." The New York Times called it a "low-budget freak show/cult classic/cultural institution" with "catchy" songs. Geoff Andrew, of Time Out, noted that the "string of hummable songs gives it momentum, Gray's admirably straight-faced narrator holds it together, and a run on black lingerie takes care of almost everything else", rating it 4 out of 5 stars. On the other hand, Dave Kehr of the Chicago Reader considered the wit to be "too weak to sustain a film" and thought that the "songs all sound the same".

In 2005, the film was selected for preservation in the United States National Film Registry by the Library of Congress as being "culturally, historically, or aesthetically significant".

=== Box office ===
In its first year of release, the film grossed $1,032,000 in the United States and Canada and $200,650 internationally.

It fared better in 1976, grossing over $11 million in the United States and Canada and $2 million internationally for a worldwide total of $14.7 million. It grossed similar amounts for the next four years and had reached a gross of $57.9 million in the United States and Canada and $68.6 million worldwide by 1980. By 1984 it had reached $100 million worldwide and by 1986 it had reached that milestone in the United States and Canada and $124 million worldwide. By 1990, the film had grossed $125.6 million in the United States and Canada and $150 million worldwide. At that date, it had an estimated profit just from theatrical release grosses of $55 million. By 1999 it had grossed almost $140 million in the United States and Canada for a worldwide gross in excess of $164 million. Since 2007, it has grossed $6.1 million worldwide giving it a worldwide gross in excess of $170 million.

== Cult following ==
=== Origins ===
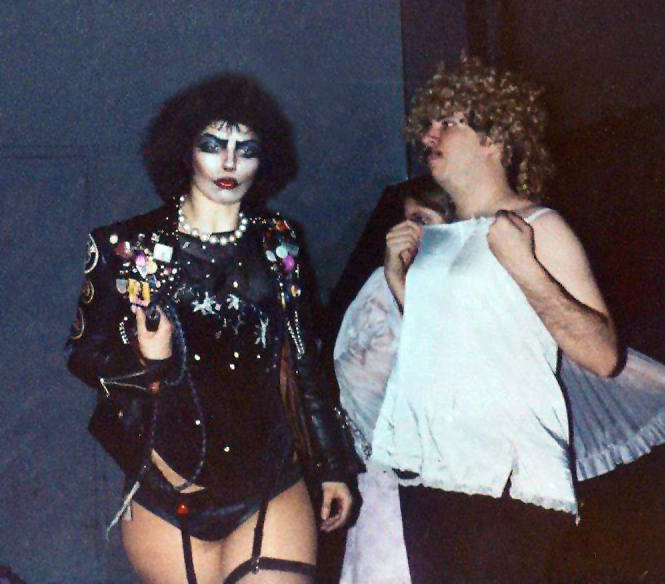
Dori Hartley and Sal Piro at the Waverly Theatre in New York in 1977

The Rocky Horror Picture Show helped shape conditions of cult film's transition from art-house to exploitation style. The film developed a cult following in 1976 at the Waverly Theatre in New York, which developed into a standardised ritual. According to J. Hoberman, author of Midnight Movies, it was after five months into the film's midnight run when lines began to be shouted by the audience. Louis Farese Jr., a normally quiet teacher, upon seeing the character Janet place a newspaper over her head to protect herself from rain, yelled, "Buy an umbrella, you cheap bitch." Originally, Louis and other Rocky Horror pioneers, including Amy Lazarus, Theresa Krakauskas and Bill O'Brien, did this to entertain each other, each week trying to come up with something new to make each other laugh. This quickly caught on with other theatre-goers and thus began this self-proclaimed "counter point dialogue", which became standard practice and was repeated nearly verbatim at each screening. Performance groups became a staple at Rocky Horror screenings due in part to the prominent New York City fan cast. The New York City cast was originally run by former schoolteacher and stand-up comic Sal Piro and his friend Dori Hartley, the latter of whom portrayed Dr. Frank N. Furter and was one of several performers, including Will Kohler as Brad Majors, Nora Poses as Janet and Lilias Piro as Magenta, in a flexible rotating cast. The performances of the audience were scripted and actively discouraged improvising, being conformist in a similar way to the repressed characters.

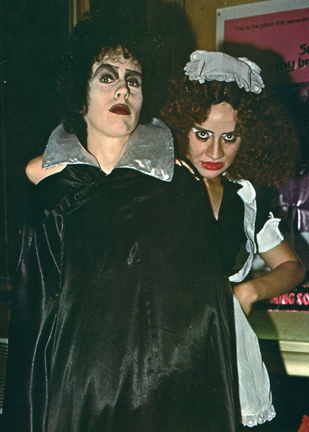
D. Garrett Gafford and Terri Hardin, Tiffany Theater Hollywood, 1978

On Halloween in 1976, people attended in costume and talked back to the screen and by mid-1978, Rocky Horror was playing in over 50 locations on Fridays and Saturdays at midnight. Newsletters were published by local performance groups, and fans gathered for Rocky Horror conventions. By the end of 1979, there were twice-weekly showings at over 230 theatres. The National Fan Club was established in 1977 and later merged with the International Fan Club. The fan publication The Transylvanian printed a number of issues, and a semi-regular poster magazine was published as well as an official magazine.

Performance groups in the Los Angeles area originated at the Fox Theatre in 1977, where Michael Wolfson won a look-alike contest as Frank N. Furter, and won another at the Tiffany Theater on Sunset Boulevard. Wolfson's group eventually performed in all of the L.A. area theatres screening Rocky Horror, including the Balboa Theater in Balboa, The Cove at Hermosa Beach and The Sands in Glendale. He was invited to perform at the Sombrero Playhouse in Phoenix, Arizona. At the Tiffany Theatre, the audience performance cast had the theatre's full cooperation; the local performers entered early and without charge. The fan playing Frank for this theatre was a transgender performer, D. Garret Gafford, who was out of work in 1978 and trying to raise the funds for a gender reassignment while spending the weekends performing at the Tiffany.

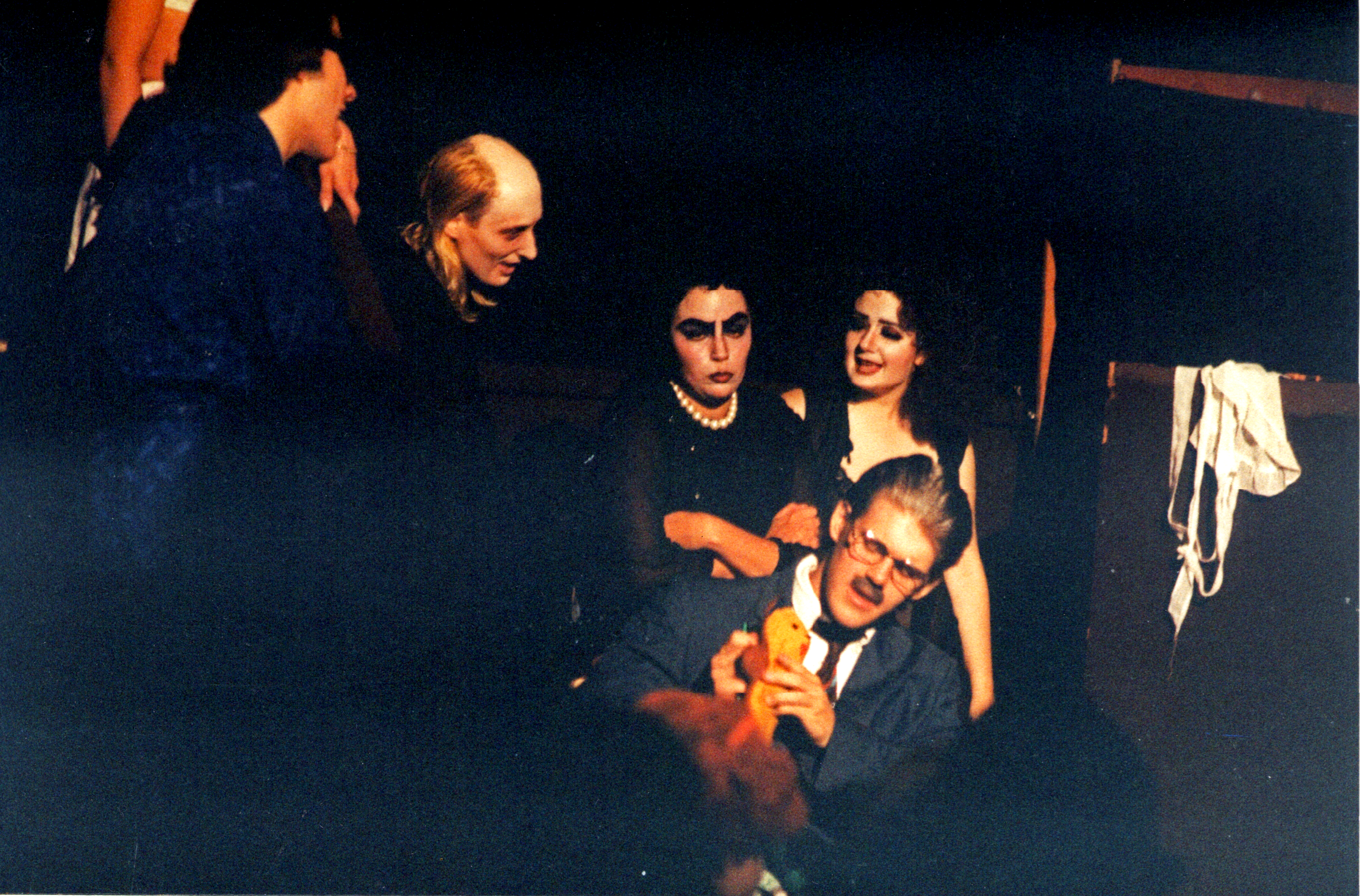
San Francisco's Strand Theatre, 1979. Linda Woods, Marni Scofidio, Denise Erickson and Jim Curry

By 1978, Rocky Horror had moved from an earlier San Francisco location to the Strand Theatre located near the Tenderloin on Market Street. The performance group there, Double Feature/Celluloid Jam, was the first to act out and perform almost the entire film, unlike the New York cast at that time. The Strand cast was put together from former members of an early Berkeley group, disbanded due to less than enthusiastic management. Frank N. Furter was portrayed by Marni Scofidio, who, in 1979, attracted many of the older performers from Berkeley. Other members included Mishell Erickson as Columbia, her twin sister Denise Erickson as Magenta, Kathy Dolan as Janet and Linda "Lou" Woods as Riff Raff. The Strand group performed at two large science fiction conventions in Los Angeles and San Francisco, were offered a spot at The Mabuhay, a local punk club, and performed for children's television of Argentina.

=== Legacy ===
Annual Rocky Horror conventions are held in varying locations, lasting days. Tucson, Arizona has been host a number of times, including 1999 with "El Fishnet Fiesta", and "Queens of the Desert" held in 2006. Vera Dika wrote that, to the fans, Rocky Horror is ritualistic and comparable to a religious event, with a compulsive, repeated cycle of going home and coming back to see the film each weekend. The audience call-backs are similar to responses in church during a mass. Many theatre troupes exist across the United States that produce shadow-cast performances where the actors play each part in the film in full costume, with props, as the movie plays on the big screen in a movie theatre. O'Brien's Orchestra, formerly known as the Queerios (based in Austin, Texas), is the longest running shadow-cast in Texas. The Oriental Theatre (Milwaukee) claims to hold the record for the longest continuous, shadow-cast run, beginning in January, 1978. The Studio Galande cinema in Paris claims to be the first cinema in the world to have started continuously showing the film in 1978. It shows the film every Saturday and Sunday with a different shadow-cast on each of those days.

The film has a global following and remains popular. Subcultures such as Rocky Horror have also found a place on the Internet. Audience participation scripts for many cities are available for download from the internet. The internet has a number of Rocky Horror fan-run websites with various quizzes and information, specialising in different content, allowing fans to participate at a unique level.

=== LGBT influence ===
Members of the LGBT community comprised a large part of the Rocky Horror cult following; they identified with the embrace of sexual liberation and androgyny, and attended show after show, slowly forming a community. Judith A. Peraino compares Brad and Janet's initiation into Frank N. Furter's world to the self-discovery of "queer identity", and to the traditional initiation of "virgins" in the shadow screenings. June Thomas describes the midnight screenings in Newark, Delaware as a "very queer scene", which increased visibility for the LGBTQ community: "The folks standing in line outside the State in fishnets and makeup every Saturday night undoubtedly widened the sphere of possibilities for gender expression on Main Street."

The Rocky Horror Picture Show remains a cultural phenomenon in both the US and UK. Cult film participants are often people on the fringe of society who find connection and community at the screenings, although the film attracts fans of differing backgrounds all over the world.

"Bisexuality, The Rocky Horror Picture Show, and Me", by Elizabeth Reba Weise, is part of the publication, Bi Any Other Name: Bisexual People Speak Out (1991), an anthology edited by Loraine Hutchins and Lani Kaʻahumanu about the history of the modern bisexual rights movement that is one of the first publications of bisexual literature.

With the rise of the transgender rights movement, however, some critics have discussed Rocky Horror as relying heavily on transphobic caricatures, while others have remained staunch in praising its broader queer transgression of the standards of the 1970s. Writing for Them, Samantha Allen described Dr. Frank-N-Furter as "as a semi-harmful caricature embraced not by other trans people, but by the sort of cis people who thought they were so cool for attending the Genderfuck Dances at my state school" but went on to praise the queer culture around Rocky Horror showings. This has been further inflamed by Richard O'Brien, who is gender-fluid himself, agreeing with the description of trans women as "mutilated men".

=== Cultural influence ===
The Rocky Horror Picture Show has been featured in a number of other feature films and television series over the years. Episodes of The Simpsons, The Venture Bros., Cold Case, Tuca & Bertie, The Boondocks, Glee, The Drew Carey Show, That '70s Show, Deutschland 86, Mickey Mouse Clubhouse, and American Dad! spotlight Rocky Horror, as do films such as Vice Squad (1982), Halloween II (2009) and The Perks of Being a Wallflower (2012). The 1980 film Fame featured the audience reciting their callback lines to the screen and dancing the Time Warp, the dance from the stage show and film, which has become a novelty dance at parties. Dr. Frank-N-Furter influenced the appearance of Emporio Ivankov, a transvestite character from the manga/anime series One Piece. Director Rob Zombie cited Rocky Horror as a major influence on his film House of 1000 Corpses (2003), while the film's fan culture of cosplaying and audience participation during screenings laid the groundwork for the similarly influential cult following surrounding Tommy Wiseau's The Room (2003). Rocky Horror also inspired John McPhail's zombie musical Anna and the Apocalypse (2018). Sabrina Carpenter's "Tears" music video takes inspiration from the film, with her portraying a character similar to Janet Weiss and actor Colman Domingo featured playing a drag tribute to Dr. Frank-N-Furter.

=== 50 year anniversary ===
In 2025, the film celebrated its 50-year anniversary. Celebratory events in Los Angeles included a talk at the Academy Museum which included the attendance of Tim Curry and a screening and fan-centered event at the Roxy.

== Sequel ==
O'Brien drafted a sequel titled Rocky Horror Shows His Heels in 1979. This script featured the return of all of the characters from the original film, and O'Brien wished to reunite the original production team. But Sharman did not wish to revisit the original concept so directly, nor did Tim Curry wish to reprise his role.

Instead, Sharman reunited with O'Brien to film Shock Treatment in 1981, a stand-alone feature with little continuity from the original film. Initially conceived and scripted in 1980 as The Brad and Janet Show, the film repurposed several songs from the earlier Rocky Horror Shows His Heels project with lyrical adjustments, and depicting the characters' continuing adventures in the town of Denton. Production was forced to adjust amidst the Screen Actors Guild strike; eventually the entire film was shot on a single sound stage. Shock Treatment was poorly received by critics and audiences upon release (largely due to the absence of Curry, Sarandon, and Bostwick) but over time has built its own niche following.

O'Brien revisited the notion for a direct RHPS sequel in 1991, writing Revenge of the Old Queen. Producer Michael White had hoped to begin work on the production and described the script as being "in the same style as the other one. It has reflections of the past in it." Revenge of the Old Queen commenced pre-production; however, after studio head Joe Roth was ousted from Fox in 1993, the project was shelved indefinitely. Although the script went unpublished, bootleg copies have leaked online, and a song from the original demo tape circulates among fans. The script remains the property of Fox, producer of the two prior films, and remains unlikely to be revived.

Between 1999 and 2001, O'Brien was working on a third attempted sequel project with the working title Rocky Horror: The Second Coming, intended as a stage production, with an option to adapt to film if met with success. This script integrated plot elements from Rocky Horror Shows His Heels paired with all-new songs. O'Brien completed a first draft of this script (which was read by Terry Jones). In the story, Brad's brother Steve seeks revenge on the aliens in the first film after Brad becomes a Las Vegas go-go dancer and falls to his death from a trapeze wearing only six-inch heels and a rhinestone choker. Also revealed is Sonny, the illegitimate son of Janet and Frank and heir to the throne of Transsexual. The script never made it past early draft stages but has been shared on many fan sites.

O'Brien produced Shock Treatment for the theatrical stage with a premiere at the King's Head Theatre in Islington, London in spring 2015.

== Glee and 2016 remake ==
"The Rocky Horror Glee Show" aired on 26 October 2010, as part of the second season of the television series Glee. It recreated several scenes from the film, including the opening credits and featured Barry Bostwick and Meat Loaf in cameo roles. An EP album covering seven songs from the movie was released on 19 October 2010.

On 10 April 2015, the Fox Network announced it would air a modern-day reimagining of the film, titled The Rocky Horror Picture Show: Let's Do the Time Warp Again. Later in the year Fox announced that the role of Dr. Frank N. Furter would be played by transgender actress Laverne Cox. Ryan McCartan played Brad, alongside Victoria Justice as Janet, with Reeve Carney as Riff Raff and Staz Nair as Rocky. Adam Lambert portrayed Eddie. Tim Curry played the Criminologist. In February 2016, the network announced that Annaleigh Ashford would portray Columbia, and Ben Vereen joined the cast as Dr. Everett von Scott. Kenny Ortega, best known for the High School Musical franchise and Michael Jackson's This Is It (2009) directed, choreographed and executive-produced the remake; Lou Adler, who was an executive producer of the original film, had the same role for the new film, which premiered on Fox on 20 October 2016.

== Video games ==
An early video game adaptation was released for Apple II, Commodore 64, Commodore 128, ZX Spectrum, and Amstrad CPC created by the CRL Group PLC.

Another adaptation, by Freakzone Games, was released on 27 October 2024, on Microsoft Windows, Nintendo Switch, PlayStation 5, Xbox Series X and Series S.

== See also ==
- Cannibalism in popular culture
- Cross-dressing in film and television
- List of American films of 1975
- List of British films of 1975
- List of cult films
- List of films featuring extraterrestrials
- List of films featuring Frankenstein's monster
- Transmisogyny
- Strange Journey: The Story of Rocky Horror, 2025 documentary about the making of The Rocky Horror Picture Show directed by Richard O'Brien's son, Linus O'Brien

== Bibliography ==
- Armstrong, Richard; Charity, Tom; Hughes, Lloyd; Winter, Jessica (2007). The Rough Guide to Film. London: Rough Guides. p. 506. ISBN 978-1-4053-8498-8.
- Batchelor, Bob (2012). Cult pop culture: how the fringe became mainstream. Santa Barbara, Calif: Praeger. ISBN 978-0-313-35780-0.
- Blackshaw, Tony (2013). Routledge Handbook of Leisure Studies. Hoboken: Taylor and Francis. ISBN 978-1-136-49559-5.
- Dika, Vera (2003). Recycled culture in contemporary art and film: the uses of nostalgia. Cambridge New York: Cambridge University Press. ISBN 978-0-521-01631-5.
- Hallenbeck, Bruce (2009). Comedy-Horror Films. Jefferson, NC: McFarland. ISBN 978-0-7864-3332-2.
- Harpole, Charles (1990). History of the American Cinema. New York: Scribner. ISBN 978-0-684-80463-7.
- Henkin, Bill (1979). The Rocky Horror Picture Show Book. New York: Hawthorn Books. ISBN 978-0-8015-6436-9.
- Hitchcock, Susan (2007). Frankenstein: a cultural history. New York: W.W. Norton. ISBN 978-0-393-06144-4.
- Lancaster, Kurt (2001). Performing the force: essays on immersion into science fiction, fantasy, and horror environments. Jefferson, NC: McFarland. ISBN 978-0-7864-0895-5.
- Lippy, Charles (2006). Faith in America changes, challenges, new directions. Westport, Conn: Praeger. ISBN 978-0-275-98605-6.
- Leitch, Thomas (2002). Crime Films. Cambridge: Cambridge University Press. ISBN 978-0-521-64671-0.
- Mathijs, Ernest (2011). Cult Cinema: An Introduction. Malden, Mass: John Wiley & Sons Ltd. ISBN 978-1-4443-9642-3.
- Mathijs, Ernest (2008). The cult film reader. Maidenhead, Berkshire: Open University Press/McGraw-Hill Education. ISBN 978-0-335-21923-0.
- Miller, Scott (2011). Sex, drugs, rock & roll, and musicals. Boston: Northeastern University Press. ISBN 978-1-55553-761-6.
- Peraino, Judith (2006). Listening to the sirens musical technologies of queer identity from Homer to Hedwig. Berkeley: University of California Press. ISBN 978-0-520-92174-0.
- Picart, Caroline (2003). Remaking the Frankenstein myth on film: between laughter and horror. Albany: State University of New York Press. ISBN 978-0-7914-5770-2.
- Piro, Sal; Hess, Michael (1991). The Official Rocky Horror Picture Show Audience Par-tic-i-pation Guide. London: Stabur Press. ISBN 978-0-941613-16-3.
- Riley, Samantha Michele (2008). Becoming the Wig: Mis/Identifications and Citionality in Queer Rock Musicals (PDF). Chapel Hill: University of North Carolina Press. ISBN 978-1-243434-27-2.
- Ross, Sharon (2011). Beyond the Box Television and the Internet. Chicester: Wiley. ISBN 978-1-4443-5865-0.
- Samuels, Stuart (1983). Midnight Movies. New York: Collier Books. ISBN 978-0-02-081450-4.
- Sandys, Jon (2007). Movie Mistakes Take 5. London: Virgin Books. ISBN 978-0-7535-1113-8.
- Santino, Jack (1994). Halloween and other festivals of death and life. Knoxville: University of Tennessee Press. ISBN 978-0-87049-813-8.
- Silvester, Delia (2013). Dance and Movement Sessions for Older People A Handbook for Activity Coordinators and Carers. City: Jessica Kingsley Publishers. ISBN 978-0-85700-846-6.
- Smith, Justin (2010). Withnail and Us: Cult Films and Film Cults in British Cinema. London: I. B. Tauris Distributed in the United States and Canada exclusively by Palgrave Macmillan. ISBN 978-0-85771-793-1. OCLC 671655083.
- Stewart, Jim (2011). Folsom Street blues: a memoir of 1970s SoMa and leatherfolk in gay San Francisco. San Francisco: Palm Drive Pub. ISBN 978-1-890834-03-6.
- Tucker, Betty (2004). Susan Sarandon: a true maverick. Tucson, Arizona: Hats Off. ISBN 978-1-58736-300-9.
