= Over at the Frankenstein Place =

1975 song by Richard O'Brien

Song by Richard O'Brien, performed by Susan Sarandon, Barry Bostwick and Richard O'Brien

from the album The Rocky Horror Picture Show
- Released: 1975
- Recorded: London
- Genre: Glam rock; soul
- Label: Ode
- Composers: Richard O'Brien, Richard Hartley
- Lyricist: Richard O'Brien
- Producer: Lou Adler

"Over at the Frankenstein Place" is the third song in the 1973 cult musical The Rocky Horror Show, sung outside Dr. Frank N. Furter (Tim Curry)'s castle in the rain in the 1975 cult film The Rocky Horror Picture Show. The song is in the key of E major.

== Release ==
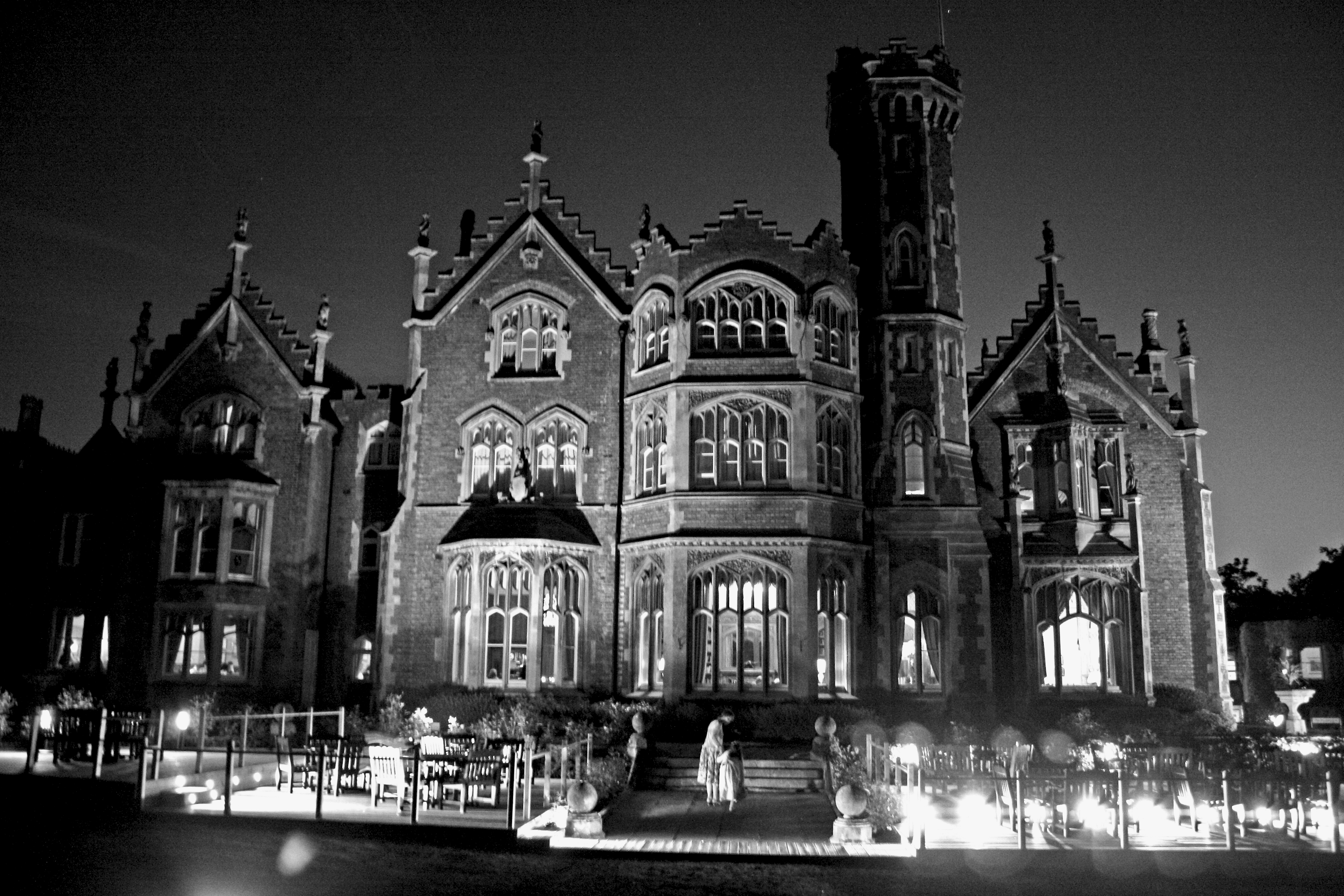
The location for Dr. Frank N. Furter's castle is Oakley Court in Bray, Berkshire

"Over at the Frankenstein Place" is the third song in the 1973 cult musical The Rocky Horror Show. The original cast performing the song in the stage version included Christopher Malcolm (Brad Majors), Julie Covington (Janet Weiss) and the show's writer Richard O'Brien (Riff Raff) The 1975 cult film The Rocky Horror Picture Show includes the song being sung outside Dr. Frank N. Furter (Tim Curry)'s castle in the rain, performed in the key of E major by Susan Sarandon (Janet), Barry Bostwick (Brad), and Richard O'Brien reprising his role as Riff Raff.

In the original Rocky Horror Show, Brad had a verse to himself ("I can see the flag fly, I can see the rain, just the same, there has got to be something better here for you and me"). This was cut for the movie—otherwise it would appear right when Brad and Janet dodge out of the way of the motorcyclists. The karaoke version of the track found on the Rocky Horror Picture Show: Sing It album has space for this extra verse, despite sticking to the movie's music for the rest of the album. In the 2000 revival for Broadway, it was performed by Alice Ripley (Janet), Jarrod Emick (Brad), and Raúl Esparza (Riff Raff). The revival retained the verse that was cut from the film, but which is present in all licensed stage productions of the show. The 2016 TV film The Rocky Horror Picture Show: Let's Do the Time-Warp Again had the song performed by Ryan McCartan (Brad), Victoria Justice (Janet) and Reeve Carney (Riff Raff).

On the Rocky Horror Picture Show DVD commentary with Richard O'Brien (Riff Raff) and Patricia Quinn (Magenta), O'Brien confessed being extremely nervous during the opening of The Rocky Horror Show. Once he could hear the audience laughing, however, he began to relax.

This was one of the songs sung by O'Brien as he revisited Oakley Court (the castle's location) for VH1's Behind the Music special. O'Brien sings Janet's verse before describing how the song was, and how the camera would tilt up to a 'very handsome chap', then O'Brien proceeded to sing his verse. O'Brien also sung the song in an acoustic style as an extra for the 1999 Rocky Interactive Horror Show PC game.

During interactive viewings of the film, audiences will sometimes light candles or matches during the song. Lighters and flames have since been replaced by flashlights, glo-sticks, and the light from cell phones now illuminate theaters during the "There's a Light" refrain.
