= Peter Hinwood =

English antiques dealer and former actor

- Born: 17 May 1946 (age 80); United Kingdom
- Occupations: Actor, antiques dealer
- Known for: The Rocky Horror Picture Show
- Partner: Christopher Gibbs

Peter Hinwood (born 17 May 1946) is an English antiques dealer and former actor. He is best known for his role as Rocky in The Rocky Horror Picture Show in 1975.

== Biography ==
Hinwood worked as both a photographer and a professional model while he was pursuing his acting career. Hinwood is mostly noted for his film appearance as the well-oiled, muscular and mostly mute creation Rocky in the 1975 cult movie The Rocky Horror Picture Show (1975). Rocky's singing voice was dubbed in post-production by Australian singer Trevor White. Both Hinwood and White were interviewed by Scott Michaels for his 2002 book Rocky Horror: From Concept to Cult. His portrayal of Dr. Frank-N-Furter's "creation" was the most significant role of Hinwood's acting career.

Hinwood had played the Greek god Hermes in the Adventures of Ulysses mini-series on British television in the late 1960s. He played Guy in Roddy McDowall's macabre Tam Lin (1971) and had a bit role in Paul Humfress and Derek Jarman's homoerotic Roman historical drama Sebastiane (1976).

Hinwood was later an antiques dealer in London and lives most of the time in Tangier. He told People magazine in 2000 that there were three reasons why he chose not to continue to milk his Horror moment. "One, I can't act. Two, I cringe with embarrassment every time I see myself on film. Three, I relish a quiet, peaceful life." Hinwood revealed that in 1994 he had rediscovered the gold hot pants he wore in the film and sold them through an auction house for nearly US$1,000. They are now part of the Hard Rock memorabilia collection and were for a time displayed in its restaurant in Myrtle Beach, South Carolina, United States. The shorts can be viewed at the Orlando Hard Rock in Florida.

== Personal life ==
His "life and business partner" was Christopher Gibbs, antiques dealer and collector, until Gibbs' death in July 2018.

== Filmography ==
Year	Title	Role	Notes
1968	The Odyssey	Hermes	
1970	Tam Lin	Guy	
1975	The Rocky Horror Picture Show	Rocky Horror – A Creation	
1976	Sebastiane	Emperor's Guest	Uncredited
2025	Strange Journey: The Story of Rocky Horror	Self	
