= Dammit Janet =

Song by Richard O'Brien performed by Barry Bostwick and Susan Sarandon

from the album The Rocky Horror Picture Show
- Released: 1975
- Recorded: London
- Genre: Pop
- Label: Ode
- Composers: Richard O'Brien, Richard Hartley
- Lyricist: Richard O'Brien
- Producer: Lou Adler

"Dammit Janet" is a song in the original 1973 British musical stage production, The Rocky Horror Show as well as its 1975 film counterpart The Rocky Horror Picture Show, book, music and lyrics by Richard O'Brien, musical arrangements by Richard Hartley.

The number provides well known audience participation moments and has entered the popular culture lexicon through the often quoted phrase "Dammit, Janet!"

== Overview ==
The first scene of both the 1973 stage production The Rocky Horror Show and 1975 film The Rocky Horror Picture Show open to a wedding scene with the two main characters, Brad Majors and Janet Weiss, in attendance. Brad and Janet were portrayed by Christopher Malcolm and Julie Covington in the original stage show. In the motion picture, a repressive Gothic setting, backs up the young couple in their chorus with the American Gothic characters themselves. Brad (Barry Bostwick) and Janet (Susan Sarandon) are portrayed as sexually uptight. The song is performed in this deliberate awkwardness, setting up the characters as naive and innocent.

The scene is reminiscent of the opening scene of the horror classic Night of the Living Dead (1968). Several comparisons of Rocky Horror with Night of the Living Dead have been made by authors such as Roberta E. Pearson and Philip Simpson in their book, Critical Dictionary of Film and Television Theory, as well as J. Hoberman and Jonathan Rosenbaum in the book, Midnight Movies. Costumes for the two characters in this scene are nearly identical to those of the two main characters Judy Maxwell (Barbra Streisand) and Howard Bannister (Ryan O'Neal) from the film What's Up, Doc? (1972).

The song is an awkward musical marriage proposal by Brad to Janet, after both have attended the wedding of two high school friends Ralph Hapschatt and Betty Munroe, just before setting off to visit their high school science teacher Dr. Everett Scott. The music for the song exaggerates the rock-n-roll tendency to repeat simple chord progressions.

The song is in the key of B♭ major.

== Musical number ==
"Dammit Janet" is the second number in the stage production following the prologue, and is performed as a duet. Act one, scene 1 opens directly on Brad and Janet as they are waving goodbye to newly wedded friends Ralph and Betty Hapschatt. For the film, the exterior location was an American-style small-town church. The original film script refers to it as the Denton Catholic Church, but as seen in the final film, it is the Denton Episcopal Church.

A notable aspect of the film production for this number is the cemetery next to the church with a billboard in the distance for comical effect. It depicts a large heart with an arrow through it with the words, "Denton, the Home of Happiness". Brad and Janet stand on opposite sides of the screen with the cemetery in the background and the billboard far in the back, but directly between each character as the song begins.

Beginning in an awkward and uncertain proclamation by Brad that he "has something to say". Janet awaits, clutching the bridal bouquet she just caught. In musical rhythm, he tells Janet that he really loves "the skillful way" she beat the other girls to the bride's bouquet.

Brad professes his love with metaphors of deep rivers and the future, all accompanied by the church staff dressed exactly as characters from the classic painting American Gothic by Grant Wood. The back-up throughout the stage play was a cast of "chorus" singers credited as "Phantoms".

The scene in the movie begins to change. As the number progresses, we follow the couple into the church while the caretaker and staff begin to prepare for a funeral. They spin the white flower arrangements around to show that they are black on the other side, and a casket is carried in and placed in front of them just as Brad and Janet kiss.

== Reception ==
The song is considered to be one of the top "heartfelt" movie moments. Further, the words "Damn it, Janet" are seen as an immortal part of cinematic history.

Along with the characters of The Rocky Horror Picture Show, the phrase "Dammit, Janet!" has entered the pop culture lexicon. The phrase has become so ingrained in society that thirty years after first singing the song for the film, American actor Barry Bostwick told an interviewer "For as long as I live, people will be coming up to me and asking me to say, "Dammit, Janet. I love you."
