= Richard Hartley (composer) =

English composer

Richard Neville Hartley is an English composer, best known for his work on The Rocky Horror Show. He grew up in Holmfirth, West Yorkshire.

== Career ==
In the 1970s he began a long association with Richard O'Brien. Hartley was originally part of the four-piece band for The Rocky Horror Show. He went on to arrange the score for the London stage and film adaptation (The Rocky Horror Picture Show) as well as its follow-up Shock Treatment, and then worked with O'Brien on another, as yet unproduced, sequel, Revenge of the Old Queen. His other 1970s film scores included Galileo (1975), The Romantic Englishwoman (1975), Aces High (1976), and the remake of The Lady Vanishes (1979).

== Musical works ==
=== Film and television ===
In the 1980s, Hartley worked primarily in television, including providing the music for the 1986 Doctor Who story Mindwarp, and TV movie productions, such as Kennedy (1983), Hitler's SS: Portrait in Evil (1985), Mandela (1987) and Rules of Engagement (1989). However he also composed for film, including the Nicolas Roeg film Bad Timing (1980), Bad Blood (1982), The Trout (1982), The Return of Captain Invincible (1983), Sheena (1984) (for which Hartley was nominated for a Golden Raspberry Award), Dance with a Stranger (1985), Parker (1985), The Good Father (1985), Consuming Passions (1988) and Tree of Hands (1989). However, one of his lesser known works is the music for The Fifth Dimension, a dark ride at Chessington World of Adventures.

In 1986, he composed additional music for the Wham! documentary Wham! in China: Foreign Skies directed by Lindsay Anderson.

In the 1990s he provided the scores for many films including Afraid of the Dark (1991), The Railway Station Man (1992), The Secret Rapture (1993), Princess Caraboo (1994), Victory (1995), An Awfully Big Adventure (1995, which was released on CD), Rough Magic (1995), Stealing Beauty (1996), September (1996), Rogue Trader (1999), and Alice in Wonderland (1999), in which he won an Emmy Award for Outstanding Music Composition for a Miniseries or a Movie (Dramatic Underscore).

Hartley provided music for the BBC/HBO film The Life and Death of Peter Sellers in 2004, and wrote the music for the film Flashbacks of a Fool (2008).

=== Stage productions ===
- Dionysius 73 (Harrowgate Opera House, 1973) – composer, musical director
- The Threepenny Opera (Sydney Opera House, 1973) – musical arrangements
- The Rocky Horror Show (Royal Court Theatre, 1973) – musical director
- Tooth of Crime (Royal Court Theatre, 1974) – musical director
- T. Zee (Royal Court Theatre, 1976) – composer, musical director
- The Rocky Horror Show (Broadway, 1975) – vocal and dance music arrangements
- Disaster (Institute of Contemporary Arts, 1978) – composer, musical director
- The Stripper (Sydney Theatre Company, 1982) – composer, musical director
- The Rocky Horror Show (London, 1990) – musical arrangements
- The Stripper (UK tour, 2009) – composer, musical director

=== Other ===
Hartley is credited as producer of two of the four tracks on "The Music of Torvill and Dean" EP, which reached #9 on the UK Singles Chart in the wake of Torvill and Dean's success at the 1984 Winter Olympics.

Hartley is credited as composer for the music on "High Tide" (1980). However, as this score sounds lifted pretty much note for note from Bernard Hermann's score for Alfred Hitchcock's "Psycho", the credit is unlikely to be valid.
