= The Rocky Horror Picture Show (disambiguation) =

The Rocky Horror Picture Show is a 1975 musical comedy horror film directed by Jim Sharman.

The Rocky Horror Picture Show or The Rocky Horror Show may also refer to:

- The Rocky Horror Show, a stage musical by Richard O'Brien first produced in 1973
- The Rocky Horror Show (franchise), based on O'Brien's musical and its film adaptation
- The Rocky Horror Picture Show (soundtrack), a 1975 release
- The Rocky Horror Picture Show cult following, based on the film as a popular midnight movie
- The Rocky Horror Show (video game), a 1985 release
- Rocky Horror Show Live, a 2015 simulcast
- The Rocky Horror Picture Show: Let's Do the Time Warp Again, a 2016 television film remake of the cult classic
- The Rocky Horror Picture Show: Let's Do the Time Warp Again (soundtrack), a 2016 release

== See also ==
- Rocky Interactive Horror Show, a 1999 video game by On-Line Entertainment
- The Rocky Horror Punk Rock Show, a 2003 tribute album by various artists
- "The Rocky Horror Glee Show", a 2010 episode of the American television series Glee
