= Kimi =

Kimi may refer to:

== People ==
- Kimi (given name)
- Kimi and Ritz, an English pop vocal duo in the 1970s
- Kimi Murdoch, Haitian-American reality television personality and cast member on Ladies of London

== Arts and entertainment ==
- Kimi Records, an Icelandic independent record label and distribution company
- Kimi (record label), a Japanese record label founded in 1990
- Kimi (film), an American thriller film directed by Steven Soderbergh
- Kimi Finster, a fictional character in the animated Nickelodeon show Rugrats

== Other uses ==
- Kimi (AI), an AI chatbot and family of large language models developed by Moonshot AI
- KIMI (FM), a radio station licensed to Malvern, Iowa, United States
- Kimi Station, a train station in Kurashiki, Okayama Prefecture, Japan
- Kimi (kabane) (君), honorific title bestowed by the Yamato Court in ancient Japan to members of the Kuni no miyatsuko (国造) class

== See also ==
- Kemi (disambiguation)
- Kimmie
