= The Rocky Horror Show (franchise) =

British parody musical comedy franchise (1975-2016)

- Created by: Jim Sharman & Richard O'Brien
- Original work: The Rocky Horror Show (1973)
- Owner: 20th Century Studios

Films and television
- Films: The Rocky Horror Picture Show (1975); Shock Treatment (1981); The Rocky Horror Picture Show: Let's Do the Time Warp Again (2016)

Theatrical presentations
- Musicals: The Rocky Horror Show (1973); Shock Treatment (2015); Rocky Horror Show Live (2015)

Audio
- Soundtracks: The Rocky Horror Picture Show; Shock Treatment; The Rocky Horror Picture Show: Let's Do the Time Warp Again

The Rocky Horror Show is a British musical comedy franchise that began with the 1973 stage performance The Rocky Horror Show. The stage performance mimics many horror B movie and science fiction elements. The stage show was adapted in 1975 as the film The Rocky Horror Picture Show, which quickly gained a cult following. After being successfully adapted to film, an "equal" was released in 1981 under the title Shock Treatment. While not an outright sequel, the film features many characters from the first film returning, as well as some cast members in different roles.

The tribute film The Rocky Horror Picture Show: Let's Do the Time Warp Again aired on Fox in 2016.

== Films ==
Film	Release date	Director(s)	Screenwriter(s)	Producer(s)
The Rocky Horror Picture Show	August 14, 1975	Jim Sharman	Richard O'Brien & Jim Sharman	Lou Adler & Michael White
Shock Treatment	October 30, 1981	Jim Sharman	Jim Sharman & Richard O'Brien; Additional ideas: Brian Thomson	Lou Adler & Michael White
The Rocky Horror Picture Show: Let's Do the Time Warp Again	October 20, 2016	Kenny Ortega	Richard O'Brien & Jim Sharman	John Ryan

=== Shock Treatment (1981) ===
Shock Treatment is a 1981 American comedy-musical and a follow-up to Rocky Horror. It is more of a spin-off than a sequel, furthering the adventures of Brad and Janet. After Brad and Janet get married they travel home to Denton, to find it taken over by Farley Flavors and encased in a reality TV studio, and the duo are put on the game show Marriage Maze. Shock Treatment features many cast members from Rocky Horror but as different characters, with the exception of Jeremy Newson, who was the only actor to reprise his role, Ralph Hapschatt.

=== The Rocky Horror Picture Show: Let's Do the Time Warp Again (2016) ===
The Rocky Horror Picture Show: Let's Do the Time Warp Again is a tribute television film broadcast on the Fox network on October 20, 2016. The film is directed by Kenny Ortega and uses the original script written by Richard O'Brien and Jim Sharman but O'Brien was not involved in the project.

In this version, Frank-N-Furter is played by Laverne Cox, Janet by Victoria Justice and Brad by Ryan McCartan.

=== Cancelled projects ===
- Rocky Horror Shows His Heels (originally The Curse of the Baby) was originally a direct sequel to Rocky Horror. The plot would have followed the resurrection of Dr. Frank-N-Furter, with Janet being pregnant with either Frank-N-Furter's, Rocky's, or Brad's child. Director Jim Sharman's reluctance to make the same film twice, as well as the availability of some of the cast, caused the project to be cancelled, and for O'Brien to begin work on The Brad and Janet Show, which eventually became Shock Treatment.
- Revenge of the Old Queen was another planned sequel to the first film written by O'Brien, and despite being the third film in the series, was often referred to as Rocky Horror Picture Show: Part Two. The story would have mostly taken place on the planet of Transexual in the galaxy of Transylvania, and focused on the Old Queen, Frank-N-Furter's mother, seeking revenge against Riff Raff for killing her son. Additionally, Janet would have an illegitimate son named Sonny, likely with Frank-N-Furter, and Brad would have died after being a bottomless go-go dancer in Las Vegas. Owned by 20th Century Fox, the script was shelved following the failure of Shock Treatment.
- A two-hour-long remake was planned by MTV Films and Sky Movies in 2009. The film was going to feature original songs and be based on the original screenplay. It was going to be made without the involvement of O'Brien, who did not give the film his blessing.

=== Alternate versions ===
- In the United States, the songs "Once in a While" and "Super Heroes" were originally cut from the film, with the "Super Heroes" segment skipping ahead to the Criminologist's speech, the scene being cut by 20th Century Fox due to being too depressing. Additionally, "Science Fiction / Double Feature (Reprise)" and the instrumental version of ”The Time Warp” were replaced in the original US release of the film with a reprise of “The Time Warp”. These edits have been restored in recent home releases and theatrical prints and this ending is included as a bonus feature on the DVD and Blu-Ray. On the Blu-Ray, there is an optional cut called the ‘US Version’ in which “Super Heroes” is cut, but “Science Fiction / Double Feature (Reprise)” and “The Time Warp” instrumental are both intact.
- An alternate version, referred to as the "Oz Cut," features the first twenty minutes of the film in black-and-white. O'Brien's original intent for the film was to turn to color when Frank-N-Furter appears as an allusion to The Wizard of Oz, however 20th Century Fox wanted a more conventional look. A similar cut appears as an Easter egg on the 25th Anniversary home release, with the picture turning to color during "The Time Warp" when Riff Raff swings open the door instead of when Frank-N-Furter appears. It also appears on all Blu-Ray editions of the film.

== Cast and characters ==
Character	Film		
Character	The Rocky Horror Picture Show	Shock Treatment	The Rocky Horror Picture Show: Let's Do the Time Warp Again
Character	1975	1981	2016
Dr. Frank-N-Furter	Tim Curry		Laverne Cox
Janet Majors (née Weiss)	Susan Sarandon	Jessica Harper	Victoria Justice
Brad Majors	Barry Bostwick	Cliff De Young	Ryan McCartan
Riff Raff	Richard O'Brien		Reeve Carney
Magenta	Patricia Quinn		Christina Milian
Columbia	Nell Campbell		Annaleigh Ashford
Dr. Everett Von Scott	Jonathan Adams		Ben Vereen
Rocky Horror	Peter Hinwood		Staz Nair
Eddie	Meat Loaf		Adam Lambert
The Criminologist / Narrator	Charles Gray		Tim Curry
Ralph Hapschatt	Jeremy Newson	Jeremy Newson	Jeff Lillico
Betty Monroe (formerly Hapschatt)	Hilary Farr	Ruby Wax	Kelly Van der Burg
Farley Flavours		Cliff De Young	
Dr. Cosmo McKinley		Richard O'Brien	
Dr. Nation McKinley		Patricia Quinn	
Nurse Ansalong		Little Nell	
Judge Oliver Wright		Charles Gray	
Bert Schnick		Barry Humphries	
Macy Struthers		Wendy Raebeck	
"Rest Home" Ricky		Rik Mayall	
Emily Weiss		Darlene Johnson	
Harry Weiss		Manning Redwood	
Irwin Lapsey		Barry Dennen	
Neeley Pritt		Betsy Brantley	
Officer Vance Parker		Chris Malcolm	
Kirk		Eugene Lipinski	
Oscar Drill		Gary Shail	
Brenda Drill		Claire Toeman	
Glish Davidson		Donald Waugh	
'Bit' Drummer		David John	
'Bit' Guitarist		Gary Martin	
Frankie		Sinitta Renet	
Guy on Pay Phone		Sal Piro (uncredited)	
Trixie			Ivy Levan
The Butler			Jayne Eastwood
Photographer	uncredited		Sal Piro
The Criminologists' Assistant			Nell Campbell (uncredited)

== Stage shows ==
=== Cancelled project ===
A new stage show and sequel to The Rocky Horror Show was announced by O'Brien in 2001. Despite its title never being announced, it is often referred to by fans of the franchise as Rocky Horror: The Second Coming. The stage show would have included elements of the scrapped Rocky Horror Shows His Heels and Revenge of the Old Queen scripts, and would have been set nine months after the original, following a pregnant Janet carrying either Rocky or Frank-N-Furters child. The song "Frankie Phoenix," which details the resurrection of Frank-N-Furter, was the only song leaked by O'Brien. It was intended to be turned into a film if the stage performance was successful.

== Alternate soundtracks ==
- The Rocky Horror Punk Rock Show is a 2003 cover album featuring many modern punk rock bands.
- The 15th Anniversary Collection is a four-CD set containing the original motion picture soundtrack, The Rocky Horror Show original Roxy show recording; Songs From the Vaults, containing rare tracks from various cast members, tracks from the Shock Treatment soundtrack and radio advertising spots for the original release; and Rocky Horror International, containing show numbers performed by various international stage casts, the original film cast recordings of "The Sword of Damocles", "Once in a While" and "Planet, Schmanet, Janet", and an included 24-page commemorative booklet and comic.
- Glee: The Music, The Rocky Horror Glee Show is an EP released on October 19, 2010 and includes the cast of Glee performing the songs from season two episode "The Rocky Horror Glee Show" which pays tribute to both the stage show and film adaption.

== Other media ==
=== Video games ===
- The Rocky Horror Show is a 1985 video game in which the player plays as either Brad or Janet collecting the pieces of the Medusa machine from around the castle.
- Rocky Interactive Horror Show is a PC game released in March 1999. Like The Rocky Horror Show video game, the player plays as Brad or Janet and attempts to save their partner from the castle. Its gameplay featured more detail, better graphics and live video sequences. The game was criticized for its clumsy user interface and two-dimensional graphics.
- The Rocky Horror Show: Touch Me was announced as an upcoming rhythm action game, with Richard O'Brien personally licensing the game. The game was expected to release in 2017, but was cancelled in 2018 due to lack of funds.
- In 2024, Freakzone Games released a side-scrolling platformer called The Rocky Horror Show Video Game.

=== Comic Books ===
- Richard J. Anobile published a photo comic based on the movie, titled The Official Rocky Horror Picture Show Movie Novel that has since gone out of print.
- The Rocky Horror Picture Show Comic Book is a 1990 three-issue comic book adaption for the 15th Anniversary Celebration was written and illustrated by Kevin VanHook, published by Caliber Press.

=== Board game ===
The Rocky Horror Trivia Game is a 2005 trivia board game created by USAopoly for the 30th Anniversary Celebration. It features 1200 questions based on The Rocky Horror Picture Show, the actors from the film and the sequel film Shock Treatment.

=== Other ===
- A series of 60 trading cards featuring an image on one side and small caption, with 50 of the cards retelling the movie, was produced by Fantasy Trading Card Company. In 1995, Comic Images created a 96-card set for the 20th anniversary.
- In 2000, Vital Toys released action figures of Frank-N-Furter, Riff Raff, and Columbia that were sold individually or as a set. Two more were planned for release, however, due to poor sales, they were never made.
- Frank-N-Furter was released as a CelebriDuck on Celebriduck.com.
- McFarlane Toys released a fully 3D rendered sculpture of the film's poster available at cultureboom.net.
- Funko released Pop! vinyl figures of Brad, Janet, Frank-N-Furter, Columbia, Riff Raff and Magenta in 2015. In 2016, they released action figures of the same characters.
