= Rocky Horror =

Rocky Horror is the title character from The Rocky Horror Show. It may also refer to

- The Rocky Horror Show (franchise)
- The Rocky Horror Show, a stage musical from 1973
- The Rocky Horror Picture Show, 1975 film adaptation of the stage musical
- Rocky Horror Show Live, a 2015 performance
- The Rocky Horror Picture Show: Let's Do the Time Warp Again
