= Kemie =

Kemie may refer to:

- Kemie language, an Austroasiatic language spoken in China
- Kemie, Tohmajärvi, a village and administrative center in Finland

== See also ==
- Kemi (disambiguation)
