= Kemi (disambiguation) =

Kemi is a town and municipality of Finland.

Kemi may also refer to:

== Places ==
- Kemi, Iran, village in Northwest Iran
- Kem, river in the Republic of Karelia, Russia, locally known as Kemi
- Kem, Russia, town in mouth of Kem river

=== Finland ===
- Kemi River, Finland
- Kemi Church
- Kemi railway station
- Kemi mine

== People ==
- Kemi Adekoya (born 1993), Nigerian-Bahraini track hurdler
- Kemi Badenoch (born 1980), British politician
- Kemi Olusanya (1963–1999), English drum and bass DJ
- Kémi Séba (born 1981), Black French activist and political leader
- Oluwafunmilayo Kemi Jimoh (born 1984), American long jumper
- Philip Kemi (born 1991), Swedish ice hockey player
- Restituta Joseph Kemi (born 1971), Tanzanian long-distance runner

== Other ==
- 1508 Kemi, Mars-crossing asteroid named after the Finnish town and river
- Kentucky Employers' Mutual Insurance, American insurance company known as KEMI
- Lightship Kemi, Finnish lighthip

== See also ==
- Kem (disambiguation)
- Kimi (disambiguation)
