= Balboa Theater =

Balboa Theater or Theatre may refer to:

- Balboa Theater (Newport Beach, California) in Newport Beach, California
- Balboa Theater (San Francisco) in San Francisco, California
- Balboa Theatre (San Diego) in San Diego, California
