= Creatures of the Night (book) =

1990 book by Sal Piro

- Author: Sal Piro
- Language: English
- Subject: The Rocky Horror Picture Show
- Publisher: Stabur Press
- Publication date: 1990
- Pages: 167
- ISBN: 0-941613-12-7
- Followed by: Creatures of the Night II (1995)

Creatures of the Night: The Rocky Horror Experience is a 1990 book by Sal Piro about the cult following surrounding The Rocky Horror Picture Show.

Piro was President of the RHPS National Fan club since 1977. The book contains information about the beginnings of the cult following as well as Piro's own experiences as a fan of the film.

Piro released a second installment, Creatures of the Night II, in 1995. This book was included with the 20th anniversary special laserdisc release of the film.
