= Kimi (given name) =

Kimi is a given name of the following notable people:

- Kimi Antonelli (born 2006), Italian Formula One driver and 2026 Formula One world champion
- Kimi Djabate (born 1975), Bissau-Guinean Afro-beat/blues musician
- Kimi Goetz (born 1994), American speed skater
- Kimi Hanauer (born 1993), Israeli artist, writer, musician, and cultural organizer
- Kimi Hsia (born 1984), Taiwanese actress and television host
- Kimi Katkar (born 1965), Indian Bollywood actress and model
- Kimi Koivisto (born 1992), Finnish ice hockey player
- Kimi Laurène Ossin (born 2008), Ivorian taekwondo practitioner
- Kimi Li (born 1985), Chinese actress and hostess
- Kimi Onoda (小野田 紀美; born 1982), Japanese politician
- Kimi Merk (born 2004), Kyrgyz-German football player
- Kimi Räikkönen (born 1979), Finnish Formula One driver and 2007 Formula One world champion
- Kimi Sato (佐藤 喜美; born 1949), Japanese classical composer
- Kimi Verma (born 1977), Indian actress Kirandeep Verma
- Kimi Takesue, Japanese experimental filmmaker
- Kimi Wakitashiro (脇田代 喜美; born 1950), Japanese basketball player
- Kimi Wong, British singer, part of the duo Kimi and Ritz
