= The Rocky Horror Show (video game) =

1985 video game

- Developer: CRL Group
- Publisher: CRL Group
- Programmer: Ian Ellery
- Series: The Rocky Horror Show
- Platforms: Amstrad CPC, Apple II, Commodore 64, Commodore 128, ZX Spectrum
- Release: 1985
- Mode: Single-player

The Rocky Horror Show is a video game, based on the musical of the same name, it was developed and published by CRL Group. It was released for Apple II, Commodore 64, Commodore 128, ZX Spectrum, and Amstrad CPC created by the CRL Group PLC.

The game received generally positive reviews from video game critics.

== Gameplay ==
Based on the musical of the same name, The Rocky Horror Show has the player control either Brad or Janet as they search the castle of Dr Frank-N-Furter for pieces of the Medusa machine in order to restore the player's partner, who's been turned to stone, and escape. They must also find keys to open doors and along the way avoid other characters who attempt to stop them. Dr Frank-N-Furter, Magenta and Columbia will remove the players clothes and randomly place them around the castle, (Note: When naked the player is unable to climb ladders which is essential to completing the game as they are using their hands to cover their genitals.) while Riff Raff and Eddie will try and kill the player. Rocky, however, is harmless. All the characters quote various lines from the musical when they encounter the player character.

== Development ==
The Rocky Horror Show was published and developed by CRL Group, having made previously licensed games such as The War of the Worlds. In 1984, negotiations by CRL were made to obtain the rights to make a computer game on the property. CRL's CEO Clem Chambers claimed in an interview with GamesTM that the rights holder for the property approached the company after being impressed by their work with The War of the Worlds. Chambers stated he wanted to base the game on the environments of the stage show instead of "the elements of dubious taste in the show itself".

Rocky Horror's creator Richard O'Brien did not have much involvement with making the game, due to being "terrified of technology". Ian Ellery, a fan of Rocky Horror, was the game's programmer.

== Release ==
Upon release the game came with a glossy colour fold-out poster and a sticker for the Spectrum, Amstrad and Commodore.

There were two versions of the game released on the ZX Spectrum, with the standard 48k release in 1985 followed by an upgraded version for the 128k Spectrum in 1986.

Only the Spectrum and Amstrad versions feature a start up screen where the character Riff Raff dances "The Time Warp" alongside the lyrics.

The Commodore meanwhile had three separate releases. The original C64 game was a straight ZX Spectrum port in 1985 (with different sprites), while an alternative C64 version was released in America by Electric Dreams in 1986 and featured entirely different graphics than the CRL version. A completely reworked version was released by CRL in 1986 for the C128 with improved graphics, more detailed characters and more colourful backgrounds and new locations.

== Reception ==
Reception

Review scores
Publication	Score
Crash	79%
Computer and Video Games	35/40
Sinclair User	3/5
Computer Gamer	15/20

The Rocky Horror Show received generally positive reviews.

Roy Wagner reviewed the game for Computer Gaming World, and stated that "The game is a challenge, but is it worth it? I think not."

Zzap!64 thought the Commodore 64 version was inferior to the Spectrum version and did not have much lasting appeal. They rated it 43% overall.

Retrospectives of the game have also been positive. Retro Gamer considered the game to be decent and worth playing. Sam Derboo from Hardcore Gaming 101 criticized the Commodore 64 version for running slow compared to the Spectrum and Amstrad versions.

== Proposed sequel ==
CRL had also originally intended to release a text adventure game called "The Rocky Horror Adventure Game" the following year, and was even teased at the ending of the Rocky Horror Show game. However the actual game never got beyond the early development stages and therefore was never released.

== Remake ==
The game was remade in 1999 as Rocky Interactive Horror Show by On-Line Entertainment for Microsoft Windows. The game was re-developed as a point and click adventure but the aim of the game remained the same as before with the player selecting either Brad or Janet as they try to escape from Dr. Frank-N-Furter's castle. The game was also notable for cut-screens featuring Richard O'Brien and Christopher Lee.
