= Ben Forster (actor) =

British actor and singer (born 1981)

- Born: 24 April 1981 (age 45)
- Origin: Sunderland, England
- Occupations: Actor, singer, songwriter
- Years active: 2009–present

Benjamin Edward Forster (born 24 April 1981) is a British actor and singer who won ITV's Superstar competition in 2012. As a result, Forster played the lead role of Jesus in the revival of Andrew Lloyd Webber's rock opera Jesus Christ Superstar in its 2012 arena tour. Forster returned to the role at the end of May to tour Australia through 2013.

Forster would later play the title character in Lloyd Webber's musical adaptation of The Phantom of the Opera.

== Career ==
Before his success in the Superstar competition, Forster played the role of Doody in Grease and was involved in Thriller – Live in 2009. Singer/songwriter Forster is based in London and performs nationally and internationally. Originally from Sunderland, he was a child singer and actor who won a scholarship at the prestigious Italia Conti Academy in London at 16.

During his training, he was heavily featured in the BBC's prime time fly-on-the-wall documentary The Dream Academy which aired to over 3 million people. The Broccoli family (of James Bond fame) staged the musical La Cava in London the same year, and Forster won a role, to make his West End debut in the production. He then went on to another lead singer role in Lennon and McCartney's West End musical All You Need Is Love. It was during the run of this show that the 20-year-old Forster began songwriting. He then began a solo singing career and signed a record deal with an independent label. He wrote and produced his first ten-song live album, but the recording company declared bankruptcy and Forster's solo musical ambitions were put on hold.

After finishing the 2012 arena tour of Jesus Christ Superstar, Forster went on to play the role of Brad Majors in the 40th anniversary tour of The Rocky Horror Show, alongside Roxanne Pallett, Rhydian, Kristian Lavercombe and Oliver Thornton.

Forster was to reprise the role of Jesus for the American tour of JCS, joining other recording artists that included Incubus' Brandon Boyd as Judas Iscariot, Destiny's Child's Michelle Williams as Mary Magdalene, 'N Sync's JC Chasez as Pontius Pilate, and Public Image Ltd's John Lydon as King Herod. The North American tour was cancelled on 30 May 2014.

In 2013–14 Forster performed the role of Magaldi in the West End production of Evita in the Dominion Theatre. In October 2015, Forster reprised the role of Buddy in Elf: The Musical at the Dominion Theatre, a role which he originated in the UK première in 2014 in Plymouth. The show ran until January 2016. In 2016 Forster has been portraying the role of The Phantom in London's The Phantom of the Opera. On 6 January 2018, while performing in Elf the Musical, Forster came down off a ladder mid-performance causing the show to stop immediately. It was later revealed that he had broken his ankle in the process, and would not finish his run with the show.

On 30 November 2023, Forster performed "Tell Me It's Not True" with Melanie C at that year's Royal Variety Performance, held at the Royal Albert Hall. The show was televised on 17 December 2023.

On April 4th 2025, Forster announced his return to the role of The Phantom in The World Tour production of The Phantom of The Opera for a limited engagement in Singapore.

== Stage credits ==
Year(s)	Production	Role	Theatre	Location
2000–2001	La Cava	Ensemble	Piccadilly Theatre	West End
2001–2002	All You Need is Love	John Lennon	Arts Theatre	West End
2007–2009	Grease	Doody	Piccadilly Theatre	West End
2009–2010	Thriller - Live	Ensemble	Lyric Theatre	West End
2012–2014	Jesus Christ Superstar	Jesus Christ	—N/a	UK Arena Tour
2014	Jesus Christ Superstar	Jesus Christ	—N/a	Australian Arena Tour
2014	Elf: The Musical	Buddy the Elf	Theatre Royal	Plymouth
2014–2015	Evita	Agustín Magaldi	Dominion Theatre	West End
2015	The Rocky Horror Show	Brad Majors	—N/a	UK National Tour
2015–2016	Elf: The Musical	Buddy the Elf	Dominion Theatre	West End
2016–2017	The Phantom of The Opera	The Phantom of the Opera	Her Majesty's Theatre	West End
2018	Elf: The Musical	Buddy the Elf	The Lowry	Salford
2020	The Phantom of The Opera	The Phantom of the Opera	Christmas Theater	Greece
2024	The Phantom of The Opera	The Phantom of the Opera	Tokyu Theatre Orb	Japan
2025	The Phantom of The Opera	The Phantom of the Opera	Singapore	World Tour

== Discography ==
Forster released his first album Acoustic Covers in 2012. The album includes acoustic covers of well-known songs from artists like Michael Jackson and Maroon 5. In 2013 he released Acoustic Covers Vol.2. It was co-produced by Ben Forster and Nik Carter and mixed by Jack Birchwood. It featured Luke Higgins on acoustic guitar and Robert Eckland on piano.

In December 2014 he released a double album – together with fellow musical theatre stars Louise Dearman and Kerry Ellis – of Alexander S. Bermange's three-person musical The Route To Happiness. This was made available as a deluxe 2-CD set and to download.
