= Shock Treatment =

1981 film by Jim Sharman

- Australian release poster by Mick McGinty
- Directed by: Jim Sharman
- Written by: Jim Sharman; Richard O'Brien; Brian Thomson (Note: Credited with 'Additional ideas'.)
- Based on: Characters by Richard O'Brien
- Produced by: Lou Adler; Michael White
- Starring: Jessica Harper; Cliff DeYoung; Patricia Quinn; Richard O'Brien; Charles Gray; Little Nell; Ruby Wax; Barry Humphries
- Cinematography: Mike Molloy
- Edited by: Richard Bedford
- Music by: Richard Hartley (score); Richard O'Brien (songs)
- Production company: 20th Century Fox
- Distributed by: 20th Century Fox
- Release date: 30 October 1981 (limited release)
- Running time: 95 minutes
- Country: United Kingdom; United States
- Language: English
- Budget: $3.5-4 million

Shock Treatment is a 1981 satirical musical comedy film directed by Jim Sharman, and co-written by Sharman and Richard O'Brien. It is a spiritual sequel to Sharman and O'Brien's 1975 film The Rocky Horror Picture Show and features characters from the previous film, most portrayed by different actors, as well as several Rocky Horror actors in new roles.

The film stars Jessica Harper as Janet Majors and Cliff DeYoung in a dual role as her husband Brad, as well as the movie's main antagonist Farley Flavors, with O'Brien and Patricia Quinn playing sibling character actors, Cosmo and Nation McKinley, and also features Ruby Wax, Charles Gray, Barry Humphries, Little Nell, Rik Mayall and Sinitta Renet (in her acting debut). The film is an international co-production between the United Kingdom and the United States.

The film is set in the fictional town of Denton, which has been placed under the control of a television network. The town's entire population is involved in the network's productions. Brad Majors finds himself imprisoned in the local mental hospital, while his wife Janet becomes the pet project of Farley Flavors, the local plutocrat.

Given a limited release on the midnight movie circuit beginning on 30 October 1981, Shock Treatment was a critical and commercial failure, not earning the same level of cult film status its predecessor received. Later reviews have been warmer, praising its satirical themes, particularly a prescient satire of reality television. In 2015, the film was adapted as a stage production in London.

== Plot ==
The town of Denton, U.S.A. has been taken over by fast food magnate Farley Flavors, who oversees the DTV (Denton Television) network television studio. Brad and Janet Majors, seated in the studio audience, are chosen to participate in the game show Marriage Maze by the kooky, supposedly blind host, Bert Schnick. While on the Marriage Maze, Brad is deemed "an emotional cripple", and is forcibly sent to Dentonvale, a mental hospital located in the studio run by siblings Cosmo and Nation McKinley and the subject of the synonymously named reality show, for "treatment".

While Brad is locked away at Dentonvale, Farley Flavors, via prerecorded video, persuades Janet to pursue superstardom, suggesting that her fame will make Brad better. Although Janet participates willingly, her compliance is assured when she is drugged by the McKinleys. Janet's parents, Emily and Harry Weiss, also become enamored with fame and television, appearing first on Marriage Maze, answering questions about Brad's alleged mental instability, and later, as their "prize" for answering questions about Brad correctly, on Happy Homes, a reality TV show that follows people on a television set of an idealized suburban home. Rapidly, Janet and her parents forget about Brad and become obsessed with fame.

In the meantime, Betty Hapschatt and Judge Oliver Wright, cohosts of the Denton Dossier and the only people not won over by Farley Flavors' flashy television shows, investigate Flavors and the other people involved in DTV. The duo eventually discover that Cosmo and Nation McKinley are not doctors as they claim, but merely character actors, and that Farley Flavors himself is Brad's jealous, long-lost twin brother, seeking to destroy Brad and take Janet for himself. Betty Hapschatt and Judge Wright break Brad out from his prison in Dentonvale and have him confront his twin. The trio break onto the set of Farley's latest show, Faith Factory, during its debut just as Janet, who is heavily drugged, is about to be crowned "Miss Mental Health". Seeing Brad helps Janet snap out of her drug-induced trance and she returns to him. Flavors imprisons Brad, Janet, Betty, and Judge Wright, then invites the remaining audience members to follow him to Dentonvale. Everyone except the four prisoners and the kids in the local band, Oscar Drill and the Bits, willingly and enthusiastically accept straitjackets and commit themselves to Dentonvale in the name of "mental health". Brad, Janet, Betty, and Judge Wright escape the office they are locked into using one of Betty's hairpins to pick the lock. They join the band and successfully hotwire the car given to Miss Mental Health by a show sponsor. Band members force open the door to the studio and Brad, Janet, Betty, Judge Wright and the band drive off as a voice over reminds the viewer that "the sun never sets on those who ride into it."

== Cast ==
- Jessica Harper as Janet Majors (née Weiss), a woman in a dysfunctional marriage and the object of Farley's desires. The role was previously played by Susan Sarandon in The Rocky Horror Picture Show.
- Cliff DeYoung plays a dual role as:
  - Brad Majors, Janet's hapless husband. The role was previously played by Barry Bostwick in Rocky Horror.
  - Farley Flavors, Brad's identical twin, the owner of a major fast food company and the new commercial sponsor of DTV, who hatches a plan to make Janet into a celebrity and commit Brad to Dentonvale.
- Richard O'Brien as Dr Cosmo McKinley, a star of the soap opera Dentonvale, and Nation's supposed brother. O'Brien previously played Riff Raff in Rocky Horror.
- Patricia Quinn as Dr Nation McKinley, a star of the soap opera Dentonvale, and Cosmo's supposed sister. Quinn previously played Magenta in Rocky Horror.
- Ruby Wax as Betty Hapschatt (née Munroe), the host of The Denton Dossier, a talk show. The role was previously played by Hilary Labow in Rocky Horror.
- Charles Gray as Judge Oliver Wright, Denton's leading social scientist. Gray previously played The Criminologist in Rocky Horror.
- Barry Humphries as Bert Schnick, the maniacal, Viennese, and supposedly blind host of the Marriage Maze show.
- Manning Redwood as Harry Weiss, Janet's bigoted father.
- Darlene Johnson as Emily Weiss, Janet's doting mother.
- Jeremy Newson as Ralph Hapschatt, Betty's ex-husband, who co-hosts The Faith Factory Show. Newson is the only actor to reprise his role from Rocky Horror.
- Wendy Raebeck as Macy Struthers, Ralph's seemingly-air-headed girlfriend, who co-hosts The Faith Factory Show.
- Betsy Brantley as Neely Pritt, a local reporter making a documentary about DTV, Flavors, Janet, and The Faith Factory Show.
- Christopher Malcolm as Vance Parker, the corrupt police officer and head of security patrolling the DTV studio. Malcolm previously played Brad Majors in the original stage The Rocky Horror Show.
- Little Nell as Nurse Ansalong, star of Dentonvale, and who is a supposed clinical nurse. Little Nell previously played Columbia in “Rocky Horror”.
- Rik Mayall as "Rest Home" Ricky, star of Dentonvale, and who is a supposed clinical orderly.
- Gary Shail as Oscar Drill, the eponymous founder and lead singer of Oscar Drill and the Bits, a local Denton garage band that performs shortly before The Faith Factory Show makes its inaugural television debut.
- Sinitta Renet (in her acting debut) as Frankie, a singer and member of Oscar Drill and the Bits, as well as one of Janet's groupies.
- Claire Toeman as Brenda Drill, a singer and member of Oscar Drill and the Bits, as well as one of Janet's groupies.

Additionally, the cast features Eugene Lipinski as Kirk, the studio's craft services worker; Barry Dennen as Irwin Lapsey, president of Lapsey Autos; Ray Charleson as the studio floor manager; Imogen Claire as the wardrobe mistress; Donald Waugh (Glish Davidson, guitarist), David John (drummer) and Gary Martin (bass guitarist) as members of Oscar Drill and the Bits; and Ishaq Bux and Annabel Leventon as studio audience members. Sal Piro, the then-President of the Rocky Horror Fan Club, makes an uncredited cameo appearance as 'Guy on Pay Phone'.

== Soundtrack ==
Ode Records issued the soundtrack album on vinyl and cassette in the United States on September 9, 1981, and later reissued it on CD in 1994. The album was produced by the composer, Richard Hartley, and includes longer versions of "Thank God I'm a Man" and "Carte Blanche", as well as two unlisted bits taken directly from the film, the Farley Flavors "commercial break" (after "Denton U.S.A.") and the rhyming dialogue, which directly precedes "Duel Duet" (before Duel Duet on the vinyl and cassette releases, and after "Breaking Out" on the CD version).

All editions are missing Richard O'Brien's solo version of the title song (which plays during the end credits and features backing vocals by Nell Campbell), though it was released as a 7" vinyl single, and included on the CD Songs from the Vaults: A Collection of Rocky Horror Rarities, which was exclusive to the Rocky Horror Picture Show 15th Anniversary boxed set.

All LP, cassette and CD issues of the soundtrack include the credit "Music and lyrics by Richard Hartley and Richard O'Brien". O'Brien's solo single version of the track "Shock Treatment" reverses the order, and gives writing credit to Richard O'Brien & Richard Hartley.

Song	Chief singer(s)	Other singers
Overture	(Instrumental)	—N/a
Denton U.S.A.	Neely, Harry, Emily, Vance, Brenda, Frankie, Ralph, Macy	Audience
Bitchin' in the Kitchen	Brad, Janet	—N/a
In My Own Way	Janet	—N/a
Thank God I'm a Man	Harry	Audience
Farley's Song	Farley	Cosmo, Nation, Ansalong, Ricky
Lullaby	Nation, Cosmo, Janet, Ansalong, Ricky	—N/a
Little Black Dress	Cosmo, Janet, Bert, Nation	—N/a
Me of Me	Janet	Frankie and Brenda
Shock Treatment	Cosmo, Nation, Ansalong	Janet, Ricky, Bert, Harry, Emily
Carte Blanche	Janet	—N/a
Looking for Trade	Janet, Brad	Oscar Drill, The Bits
Look What I Did to My Id	Emily, Harry, Cosmo, Nation, Macy, Ralph, Ansalong, Ricky	—N/a
Breaking Out	Oscar Drill	The Bits
Duel Duet	Farley, Brad	—N/a
Anyhow, Anyhow	Brad, Janet, Oliver, Betty	Oscar Drill, The Bits, Farley, Cosmo, Nation, Bert, Harry, Emily, Ralph, Macy, Vance, Ansalong, Ricky, Kirk, The floor Manager, The Wardrobe Mistress, The Makeup Artist, Audience

=== Charts ===
Chart (1982)	Peak position
Australia (Kent Music Report)	73

To obtain the American sound required for the DTV audience in several of the musical numbers, about 50 American soldiers were brought in to record the choruses in question. According to Hartley, the servicemen were unsure of the subject matter of the lyrics and how they would be used in the film.

== Production ==
=== Development ===
Following the unexpected and overwhelming success of The Rocky Horror Picture Show on the midnight circuit, Richard O'Brien approached producer Michael White with the idea of filming a sequel. In 1978, he began work on a script titled Rocky Horror Shows His Heels, which found Frank and Rocky resurrected, Brad and Dr. Scott now lovers, and Janet pregnant with Frank's baby. Director Jim Sharman was resistant to revisit the material and Tim Curry had no desire to reprise the role of Frank, but O'Brien had put some work into the songs, so he decided to retain them and simply revise the story.

The new script was titled The Brad and Janet Show. This version is closer to what ultimately became Shock Treatment and was planned to be produced, but the filmmakers were plagued with a variety of problems. Dr. Scott had also been included in the script, but Jonathan Adams was busy performing in Tom Lehrer’s musical revue Tom Foolery and was not allowed to take time off of his contract to reprise his role. The filmmakers intended to shoot on location in Denton, Texas, but production screeched to a halt in 1980 when the Screen Actors Guild went on strike.

With only a small window when cast and crew were available, the filmmakers had to get creative. Television had been a heavy motif in the script, so production designer Brian Thomson came up with the notion to rework the story and set it in a giant TV studio, using a film studio in England, which shaved $1 million from the budget and gave them the luxury of working in a controlled environment. The script endured a final draft in which all of the locations were changed to television shows, and the role of Dr. Scott morphed into game show host Bert Schnick. "I was frightened the strike was going to finish too soon and we'd have to go back to our original conception", commented O'Brien.

=== Casting ===
Many Rocky Horror cast members returned for the film, most notably O'Brien, Patricia Quinn, Little Nell, and Charles Gray, but only Jeremy Newson reprised his role (as Ralph Hapschatt). Several of the film's original Transylvanians appeared in the movie; Ishaq Bux, Annabel Leventon, Gaye Brown, and Lindsay Ingram in the DTV audience, while Imogen Claire, Rufus Collins, and Pierre Bedenes were given the slightly larger parts of the Wardrobe Mistress and Neely's camera crew, respectively. Raynor Bourton, who originated the role of Rocky in the stage production, and Robert Longden, who took over the role of Riff Raff from Richard O’Brien in the same production, portrayed two of the soldiers in the DTV audience, and Chris Malcolm, who originated the role of Brad Majors on stage, was cast as Vance Parker, a local police officer. Additionally, Gary Martin, who played the titular character in a 1979 production of the show, portrayed a member of Oscar Drill and the Bits, a local band in Shock Treatment. Founder and long-time president of Rocky Horror fan club, Sal Piro, also has a silent cameo appearance as the man using the payphone during the opening sequence.

With her career on the rise, Susan Sarandon demanded more money than the budget allowed. Auditions were held at The Roxy theater to find a suitable replacement, and Jessica Harper, previously of Brian De Palma's cult musical Phantom of the Paradise, impressed the filmmakers with her singing skills.

Cliff DeYoung had been Sharman's original choice for Brad in The Rocky Horror Picture Show after they worked together on the 1972 off-Broadway play Trials of Oz, but DeYoung was starring on the television series Sunshine in California and was unable to appear. Upon learning that Barry Bostwick was unable to participate in Shock Treatment, Sharman tracked down DeYoung and gave him the role of Brad. This afforded DeYoung the opportunity to reunite with Harper, with whom he had co-starred in a stage production of Hair.

=== Filming ===
As is standard with musicals, music and vocals were recorded prior to principal photography at the renowned Abbey Road Studios. The first scene shot was the Farley Flavors commercial break with Macy Struthers and a group of children. Wendy Raebeck was ill and collapsed after one of her takes.

DeYoung modeled his performance of Brad after David Eisenhower and based Farley on Jack Nicholson. The elaborate opening shot begins on Farley in the overhead video booth, and the camera slowly does a 360° pan around the room as the crew prepares for the show and Brad and Janet enter the studio. For this scene, DeYoung had to do a quick change and quickly run downstairs to hit his second mark. "Duel Duet" was shot over the course of a day, with DeYoung spending the morning shooting his scenes as one character and the remainder of the day costumed as the other. He began with a very restrained performance of the song but was encouraged to go broader and was pleased with the final result.

== Reception ==
=== Box office ===
In spite of pre-release hype (including a promotional TV special called The Rocky Horror Treatment), the film was both a critical and commercial failure when it was released only as a midnight movie on Halloween 1981. It never received a full general theatrical first-run release. Due to its increased budget and limited release, Shock Treatment was an even bigger financial flop than Rocky Horror's original general release in 1975.

=== Initial critical response ===
Rotten Tomatoes, a review aggregator, reports that 43% of 7 (3 of 7) surveyed critics gave the film a positive review. According to Metacritic, which assigned the film a weighted average score of 36 out of 100 based on 7 critics, Shock Treatment has received "generally unfavorable reviews". On Metacritic the film has a weighted average score of 36 out of 100 based on 7 critics, indicating "overwhelming dislike".

In their syndicated reviews show, Gene Siskel and Roger Ebert both gave the film negative reviews. Siskel said Harper was a bad choice to star in a musical given his opinion of her singing voice as mediocre, and he also felt the producers and directors of Shock Treatment had attempted to create a cult film when such devoted fan followings can only rise organically and not be forced. Ebert said the film was a weak shadow of its predecessor, and additionally predicted the intended audience of Rocky Horror fans would ignore Shock Treatment and instead continue their regular pilgrimages to Rocky Horror showings.

=== Later reception ===
Shock Treatment was quickly dismissed by most Rocky Horror enthusiasts who were put off by the re-casting of the leads and by the fact that Tim Curry did not participate. Fans also resented Richard O'Brien's infamous tagline, "It's not a sequel... it's not a prequel... it's an equal." O'Brien later recanted, frequently criticizing the film by going so far as to refer to it as "an abortion". Gradually, however, Shock Treatment did build up its own fanbase. Some recent reviews felt the early negative reaction to Shock Treatment originated from it being ahead of its time, and an early satire of reality television.

O'Brien did write a rough script for a direct sequel to Rocky Horror titled Revenge of the Old Queen. In the story, Brad's brother Steve seeks revenge on the aliens in the first film after Brad becomes a Las Vegas go-go dancer and falls to his death from a trapeze wearing only six-inch heels and a rhinestone choker. Also revealed is Sonny, the illegitimate son of Janet and Frank and heir to the throne of Transsexual. The script never made it past early draft stages but has been shared on many fan sites.

== Home media ==
The film first surfaced on VHS as a rental exclusive in 1982. A retail Laserdisc was released in 1983 in the UK, followed by VHS and Betamax releases in the US in 1985. As Shock Treatment was filmed in Open matte, all releases prior to the DVD were presented in a Fullscreen aspect ratio rather than the theatrical 1.85.1 format.

Shock Treatment was first released on DVD in the UK on May 22, 2006, as part of The Rocky Horror Picture Show 30th Anniversary Collector's Edition The disc only included a theatrical trailer in terms of special features. A special edition DVD, labeled as the 25th Anniversary Edition, was issued in the United States on September 5, 2006, both as a stand-alone release and packaged with the two-disc Rocky Horror special edition. Special features include an audio commentary with fan club presidents Mad Man Mike and Bill Brennan, a making-of featurette, a music retrospective featurette, and domestic and international trailers.

Virtually every home video edition has suffered from audio flaws. VHS and Beta editions included warbling anomalies during the Overture and Farley's Song, which briefly knocked the sound out of sync. All DVD releases include a brief sound dropout before the last chorus of Denton USA, and a chunk of the end credit Overture has been lopped off to prematurely fade into the single version of Shock Treatment. The original version features the complete Overture playing over the credits, with Shock Treatment continuing over a black screen as exit music. This edit shortens the film's running time from 95 to 92 minutes.

In 2017, the British label Arrow Video released the film on Blu-ray in the UK which featured a new commentary with Quinn and Little Nell, as well as "The Rocky Horror Treatment". It has not received a Blu-ray release in the States.

== Stage adaptation ==
=== Production ===
For nearly a decade beginning in the mid-2000s, director Benji Sperring, a fan of the film, attempted to convince Richard O'Brien to give him the rights to produce a stage adaptation of Shock Treatment. O'Brien finally relented and gave his consent, stipulating that it had to be staged in a very small, intimate venue, as the original The Rocky Horror Show had been. On this proviso, the show wound up at the King's Head Theatre in Islington, London, where artistic director Adam Spreadbury-Maher made the suggestion that Tom Crowley adapt the script. Crowley had never seen the film, and read the screenplay first to prepare for his interview. He was initially apprehensive about the project, but Sperring's vision was so concise that he agreed. It was reported that O'Brien adapted and produced the show, but otherwise remained fairly hands-off. O'Brien, co-composer Richard Hartley, and Sperring agreed on the story's direction prior to scripting, and they consulted primarily through email during the rest of the production process.

Sperring and Crowley reworked the story, eliminating most of the supporting and peripheral characters. "A big point of inspiration for me came from the screenplay that became Shock Treatment, The Brad and Janet Show", commented Crowley, "wherein the major factor in Brad and Janet's marital difficulties was that Janet had just been promoted at the local TV studio and Brad had just lost his job."

"The biggest shock is that in the original movie, there isn't any shock treatment", Sperring remarked. "They don't really explore that, so we've put that back in."

The production premiered at the King's Head theatre in Islington, London, in the United Kingdom in the spring of 2015.

=== Cast ===
- Julie Atherton as Janet Majors
- Ben Kerr as Brad Majors
- Mark Little/Pete Gallagher as Farley Flavours
- Mateo Oxley as Ralph Hapschatt
- Rosanna Hyland as Betty Hapschatt
- Nic Lamont as Nation McKinley
- Adam Rhys-Davies as Cosmo McKinley

=== Reception ===
The Daily Telegraph wrote "this sequel to The Rocky Horror Show can't match the original but still provides deliriously silly entertainment"; The Stage singled out Mark Little as being scarcely able to carry a tune, but Carrie Dunn wrote in her review for Broadway World, "his sheer charisma and presence is absolutely perfect."

== See also ==
- Rocky Horror sequels and other media
