= Tiffany Theater =

Former theater inHollywood, California

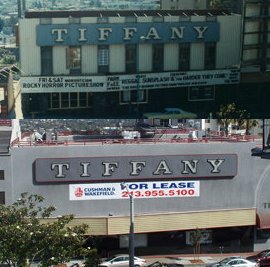
- Tiffany Theater in 1980 and 2011
- Interactive map of Tiffany Theater
- Location: 8532 West Sunset Boulevard; West Hollywood, California; United States
- Coordinates: 34.093827°N 118.3772356°W
- Type: Theater
- Events: Movie theater, playhouse

Construction
- Opened: November 2, 1966
- Closed: 2004
- Demolished: August 8, 2013
- Cost: $250,000
- Architect: Jack Edwards

The Tiffany Theater was the first theater on the Sunset Strip in West Hollywood, California. It stood west of La Cienega between the Playboy Club and Dino's Lodge restaurant. Before being converted from the Mary Webb Davis Modeling School office at 8532 W. Sunset Blvd to a movie theater, the building had been seen in the 1958–1964 television series 77 Sunset Strip as the office for detectives Efrem Zimbalist, Jr., Roger Smith, and Edd Byrnes.

== History ==
The Tiffany opened on November 2, 1966, and was owned by producer Robert L. Lippert and veteran exhibitor Harold Goldman. It was equipped with 400 seats, and boasted “Continental Seating” with no aisle up the middle for “maximum audience viewing and comfort.” It was designed by architect Jack Edwards and built by Lippert Construction Company, with carpets provided by B.F. Shearer and seats from Haywood –Wakefield. The interior of the theater was designed by Ben Mayer with the new façade and marquee designed by Heath & Company for the structure that was originally built in 1935. One of its unique design elements was that the entrance was located to the right side of the screen and in the middle of the auditorium separating it into long top and bottom sections instead of the more common left, center and right design. At the time, the $250,000 theater was the most expensive house Lippert had ever built. The newly opened Tiffany Theater can be seen in the Mondo documentary The Forbidden. In that film, the marquee displays "Young Aphrodites" and Bergman's "Smiles of a Summer Night." "Young Aphrodites" was the first film to be shown there, with gala champagne opening. It can also be seen in the 1967 John Boorman film "Point Blank" when the character 'Walker', portrayed by Lee Marvin first sees the 'Yost' character played by Keenan Wynn. The theatre can be seen from the roof of the Lou Costello Building opposite and is showing the 1965 Danish sex comedy "Eric Soya's 17", also known as "Sytten".

By 1968, the Tiffany was hosting live performances by the improv troop, The Committee, featuring future celebrities Howard Hessman, Peter Bonerz and Rob Reiner. The act was filmed, and it debuted as a feature film at the Tiffany in May, 1978. The Committee was followed by the "Sensual Musical Fantasy" As You Like It (based on Shakespeare's play), which took the stage for several months. In 1970, it was replaced by a live show called "Man and Wife," which was advertised as a "documentary performance" depicting scenes from a marriage. Legal trouble erupted as the show was declared obscene by a local Judge. Although cast members testified it was simulated, several performers were arrested for performing a scene "allegedly involving sexual intercourse."

== New management ==
In the summer of 1971, the Tiffany adopted a policy of showing two films for 49 cents. By the mid ‘70s, the theater was closed, reopening on March 16, 1977, as a revival theater and art house leased by film enthusiast Tommy Cooper. The first films shown at the revamped Tiffany were a trio of vintage Sherlock Holmes films (The Scarlet Claw, The Adventures of Sherlock Holmes and Sherlock Holmes Faces Death) followed by the first showing in over 20 years of the 1953 3D film Kiss Me Kate. Cooper operated other revival theaters in the Los Angeles area, including the Tiffany's sister theater, the Vagabond, near downtown.

=== Golden years ===
On June 10, 1977, the Tiffany began showing The Rocky Horror Picture Show at midnights on Friday and Saturday nights. It rapidly became a hub of the Rocky Horror cult while remaining a prime destination for a variety of overlooked films, new and old. In the days before home video rental, the Tiffany became known for showing quality prints of classics like MGM musicals and other vintage titles, while also showcasing a variety of rock films. It was not unusual for a film like Lawrence of Arabia to show one week, followed by The Song Remains the Same the next. Many gay themed films played there as well, at a time when such content was seldom seen or brushed aside by mainstream theaters.

=== Unique attributes ===
A unique attribute of the Tiffany was the moderate angle of the theater, creating the perfect projection conditions for 3D films. The Tiffany often took advantage of these conditions, showing many rare revivals of 3D movies including Dial M for Murder, House of Wax and Kiss Me Kate. The layout of the theater also enhanced the Rocky Horror experience as well, with a low-situated screen and a perfectly located aisle in the middle of the theater, audience participation included creating a variety of shadow-images on the screen by holding up hands or props at various times in the movie. One of the biggest reactions at the Tiffany's Rocky Horror screenings came on nights when the marquee letters “J-A-N-E-T” were held up during the song “Damnit, Janet” by a group of regular attendees at precise time actor Barry Bostwick sang a line reciting the letters. The letters appeared on the screen as if they were actually projected there, to the boisterous delight of the audience.

==== 3D Movies at the Tiffany ====
- Kiss Me Kate
- It Came From Outer Space
- Gorilla at Large
- The Mad Magician
- Inferno
- 3 Stooges Short Spooks & Pardon My Backfire
- Man In Dark
- Miss Sadie Thomson
- Andy Warhol's Frankenstein in 3D
- Cartoons in 3D
- House of Wax
- Dynasty
- Dial M for Murder

== Hub of a cult ==
As Rocky Horror became more popular, the crowds grew and 2 AM shows were added on Friday and Saturday nights. In the summer of 1979, there was a midnight show on Thursday nights as well. That same summer, the Tiffany was the only theater with the original, uncut, version of Rocky Horror including the then scarce “Super Heroes” ending. The Tiffany was legendary in its day for the over-the-top audience participation, which included a real-life hopeful transsexual, Garrett Gafford, appearing in the pre-show cast as Frank N Furter.

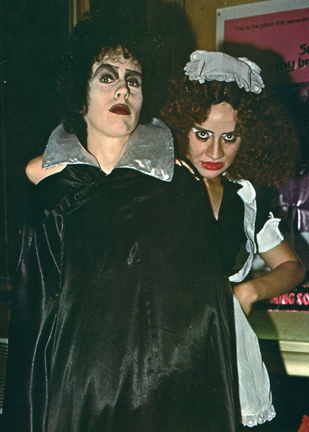
D. Garrett Gafford as Frank N Furter and Terri Hardin (as Magenta) at the Tiffany Theater on the Sunset Strip in 1978 for a screening of The Rocky Horror Picture Show

On more than one occasion, a real motorcycle rode around the theater during Meatloaf's “Hot Patootie” number in the movie as well. As a result of the mayhem, a number of media outlets began to cover the wild activities. It has been noted by patrons in the late '70s and early '80s that the line outside the Tiffany waiting to get into Rocky Horror was as much fun as the movie itself.

Part of the draw was the friendly environment fostered by the Tiffany's management and staff. Much of the staff was made up of hired audience members and theater regulars. A "party" atmosphere was encouraged, and enhanced by the large number of repeat patrons and performers who attended Rocky Horror. Up until the early '80s, the midnight showings at the Tiffany were complete sell-outs every week. Many of the regulars were allowed to attend ticketless, and sat on the floor up front or in the aisles. It was not uncommon for die-hards to remain through the 2 AM shows as well, which kept things lively all night long. Many up-and-coming Hollywood figures worked at the Tiffany during this period, including Variety Senior Editor Steven Gaydos who managed the Tiffany, and Emmy-winning screenwriter René Balcer who worked as an usher exclusively for the Rocky Horror Picture Show screenings.

Rocky Horror stars Tim Curry and Susan Sarandon each came to the Tiffany in the late '70s and signed the movie's permanent one sheet in the theater's lobby. Barry Bostwick attended a special anniversary screening on June 19, 1981. He also signed the one sheet, as well as presenting the theater with a pair of original briefs that he wore in the film. Bostwick discusses the experience on the 35th Anniversary edition DVD's special features interview, Don't Dream It, Be It: The Search for the 35th Anniversary Shadowcast. Other local celebrities were spotted at midnight shows as well, including Jane Fonda, David Carradine, Ann Robinson, Steve Vai, and even Captain Kangaroo himself, Bob Keeshan.

=== End of an era ===
By the time Cooper's lease ran out in 1983, home video was rapidly making revival theaters irrelevant. Additionally, Rocky Horror was playing in more theaters than ever, cutting into the Tiffany's main source of income. Cooper let go of the theater, and it was announced that it would soon be converted into a “legitimate theater.” The Tiffany closed its doors after its final midnight screening of The Rocky Horror Picture Show on March 13, 1983. Both the signed poster and the underwear (framed and autographed) were auctioned off that night along with several other artifacts from the Tiffany's lobby.

== Live theater ==
The Tiffany was ready to reopen in June, 1985 as two separate 99-seat live theaters, though there was a several month delay due to a conflict with Actors Equity. Once the Union's issues were resolved, the Tiffany became an active home for small, but respected, performances, featuring some well-known or soon-to be famous cast members. Among the more high-profile offerings was a four-month run of an updated The Rocky Horror Show, which opened on January 29, 1999, and starred David Arquette. Not coincidentally, the original Rocky Horror Show had its US opening at the Roxy Theater, a few blocks down the Sunset Strip from the Tiffany.

=== Live productions at the Tiffany ===
1985: Rain
1986: The Killing of Michael Malloy
1989: Wolverines (Tom Patchett)
1989: King of Hearts (Edward Winter, Courteney Cox, Michael Spound, Larry Randolph)
1990: "Laughing Wild" (Christopher Durang) Playwright & Performer, Dennis Erdman (Director), Grant Shaud and Christine Ebersole (Christine would be replaced by (Jean Smart) during rehearsals and after a few performances Grant Shaud would be replaced by the Playwright (Christopher Durang)
1990: Blossom Dearie (in a 2-week musical engagement, in May)
1990: A Shayna Maidel
1992: Woman in Mind ( Helen Mirren, Paxton Whitehead, Angela Payton, J.D. Cullum, Marsha Dietlein, John Getz, Tony Carlin) Maps for Drowners (Lisa Kudrow, Marion Ross, Norman Reedus - 6 weeks, beginning in April)
1992: Give 'Em Hell, Harry (Jason Alexander)
1993: "Lady - Like" (Donna Emett, Georgia Phillips, Kevin Richardson, Sam Lloyd, Antony Carbone, Jill Tracy, Mark Snelson, Carol Arthur, Joe R. Sicari, Liz Torres)
1994: Oleanna (Kyra Sedgwick)
1994: Marvin's Room (Mary Steenburgen, Jean Smart, Jane Cecil, Tim Monsion)
1995: Staccato (Eugene Robert Glazer, Cameron Watson, Sarah MacDonnell, Anthony Russell, Edith Fields)
1995: Why We Have a Body (Amy Resnick, K. K. Dodds, Shareen Mitchell)
1995: Fatty
1995: Twist of Fate (Lisa Raggio, Dan Gerrity, Tia Texada)
1996: The Apple Doesn't Fall Far Drom The Tree (Directed by Leonard Nimoy—opened Feb 22)
1996: Kindertransport (Holland Taylor, Kala Savage, Jane Kaczmarek, Elizabeth Hoffman)
1996 All I Really Need to Know I Learned in Kindergarten (Beth Howland, Robert Mandan, David Naughton, Michael Tucci)
1996: Tight Quarters (Rio Hibler-Kerr, John Ganun, Reece Holland, Tony Spinosa, James Michael Connor, Julianne Buescher, Ric Stoneback, Gary Paul Clark, Chuck Rosen)
1996: The All Night Strut (Steve Gideon, Lance Roberts, Andrea Chamberlain and Sharon Young-Fuller)
1997: Star Dust (Joan Van Ark, Vanessa Marshall)
1997: There Once Was a Girl From Pawtucket (Joanne Baron, Jackie Green)
1997: Lullaby of Broadway (Nathan Holland, Kirby Tepper, James Matthew Campbell)
1998: Crooks
1998: The Last Session
1999: The Rocky Horror Show (David Arquette, Eric Leviton, Bob Simon, Timothy A. Fitz-Gerald, Lacey Kohl, Donnie Kehr, Kirsten Benton, Hynden Walch, Paxton Whitehead)
1999: Wet Weather Cover (Oliver Cotton, Richard Zavaglia, Ian Ogilvy)
1999: Talk About Money (John Saxon, Tom Astor)
1999: Scent of Rain: A Love Story Really! (Nicholas Conlon, Ryan Idol)
2000: Detachments (Glenne Headly)
2000: Confidentially, Cole (Bryan Schimmel, Cliff Hayden)
2000: A Private Spirit . . . The Music and Wit of Noel Coward (Don Snell)
2001: Call Waiting . . . A Painful Comedy! (Caroline Aaron)
2001: Diablogues (Alan Goodson, Joe Hulser Larry Cox, Christy Keefe, Samantha Bennett)
2001: An Intimate Evening With Lypsinka (John Epperson - benefit for the American Foundation for AIDS Research)
2001: Seltzer-Man (David Proval)
2001: Joe Louis Blues (Russell Hornsby, Shelley Robertson, Ellis E. Williams, Barry Primus, Sterling Macer Jr., Gregg Daniel)
2001: Back From Broadway (Hershey Felder, James Barbour )
2002: Five One Act Plays: Stolen Child (Mike Weaver, Lanette Ware) Boise, Idaho, Daniel on a Thursday, Homecoming and Who's on Top

== Final days ==
The Tiffany's facade remained relatively unchanged until May 1997, when the theater was shut down for interior improvements and an exterior redesign, modernizing the look by covering the upstairs suite windows with stucco. It reopened in September of the same year. In 1999, there was talk of moving the theater across the street as part of a re-development plan for the entire block, though "The Sunset Millennium Project" was postponed for many years. The Tiffany remained a live theater through 2002, and in 2004, it briefly became the home of the Actors Studio, though it closed at the end of that year. It remained closed and available for lease until 2013.

On August 8, 2013, CIM Group began demolition of the Tiffany and the surrounding structures to make way for its re-christened Sunset/La Cienega Project, a hotel development at 8490 Sunset Boulevard and residential development at 8500 Sunset Boulevard. On August 26, the Tiffany's historic sign letters were part of an archival rescue by Tommy Gelinas of Valley Relics Museum and Alison Martino's Vintage Los Angeles preservation group. Jason Relic Hunter removed the sign with the help of a crew of volunteers, while a small group of the theater's former patrons gathered to watch. The theater letters are now displayed at Valley Relics Museum. The demolition of the Tiffany Theater was completed on August 30, 2013. All that remains of the historic block is a marker in the sidewalk at what was 8524 Sunset Blvd, designating it as the shooting location of 77 Sunset Strip.
