= Rocky Horror Show Live =

2015 American film by Christopher Luscombe

- Directed by: Christopher Luscombe
- Written by: Richard O'Brien
- Based on: The Rocky Horror Show by Richard O’Brien
- Produced by: John Wyver
- Starring: David Bedella; Haley Flaherty; Ben Forster; Dominic Andersen; Kristian Lavercombe; Jayde Westaby; Sophie Linder-Lee; Richard Meek; Andrew Ahern
- Narrated by: Richard O'Brien; Emma Bunton; Adrian Edmondson; Stephen Fry; Anthony Head; Mel Giedroyc
- Edited by: Dan Smith
- Music by: Richard O'Brien
- Production companies: Ambassador Theatre Group; Rocky Horror Company
- Distributed by: Picturehouse Entertainment
- Release date: 17 September 2015
- Running time: 129 minutes
- Country: United Kingdom
- Language: English
- Box office: $912,652

Rocky Horror Show Live is a 2015 musical performance event simulcast live to cinemas across the United Kingdom and Europe from London's Playhouse Theatre on 17 September 2015. The performance, which raised funds for Amnesty International, was the highlight of a two-week run of The Rocky Horror Show at the Playhouse from 11 to 26 September, all featuring the show's creator Richard O'Brien as a narrator.

== Cast ==
Most of the cast appearing have played their particular characters in past productions around the world. The list below is of those who appeared in the television broadcast of the production, including the special celebrity narrators, most of whom have been involved in a production at one time or another.

- David Bedella as Frank N. Furter
- Haley Flaherty as Janet Weiss
- Ben Forster as Brad Majors
- Dominic Andersen as Rocky Horror
- Kristian Lavercombe as Riff Raff
- Jayde Westaby as Magenta/Usherette
- Sophie Linder-Lee as Columbia
- Richard Meek as Eddie/Dr. Scott
- Will Knights, Ben Kerr, Hannah Malekzad and Rachel Grundy as the Phantoms
- Andrew Ahern as Swing
- Stephen Fry (uncredited) as First Narrator
- Ade Edmondson as Second Narrator
- Emma Bunton as "Time Warp" Narrator
- Mel Giedroyc as Third Narrator
- Anthony Head as Fourth Narrator
- Richard O'Brien as himself/narrator

== Scenes and musical numbers ==
1. "Science Fiction/Double Feature"
2. "Dammit Janet"
3. Criminologist Interlude
4. "Over at the Frankenstein Place"
5. Criminologist Interlude
6. "Time Warp"
7. "Sweet Transvestite"
8. "The Sword of Damocles"
9. "I Can Make You a Man"
10. "Hot Patootie (Bless My Soul)"
11. "I Can Make You a Man" (reprise)
12. Janet's Bedroom
13. Criminologist Interlude
14. Brad's Bedroom
15. Criminologist Interlude
16. "Touch-a, Touch-a, Touch-a, Touch Me"
17. "Once in a While"
18. "Eddie's Teddy"
19. "Planet Schmanet Janet"
20. Criminologist Interlude
21. "Rose Tint My World"
22. "Fanfare/Don't Dream It, Be It"
23. "Wild and Untamed Thing"
24. "I'm Going Home"
25. "Return to Transylvania"
26. "Superheroes"
27. "Science Fiction/Double Feature" (reprise)
28. Curtain Call

== Release ==
The Gala performance was broadcast to over 600 cinemas across the UK and Europe; grossing more than £600,000 at the UK box office alone. It beat Legend and Maze Runner: The Scorch Trials to take the top spot at the UK box office.

An edited version was later broadcast on BBC America in the United States, on Sky Arts in the United Kingdom, SBS in Australia, Canal+ Extra in Spain, and on YLE Teema in Finland.

Fans have petitioned for a release of the broadcast onto DVD.
