= Balboa Theater (Newport Beach, California) =

Historic theater in Newport Beach, California

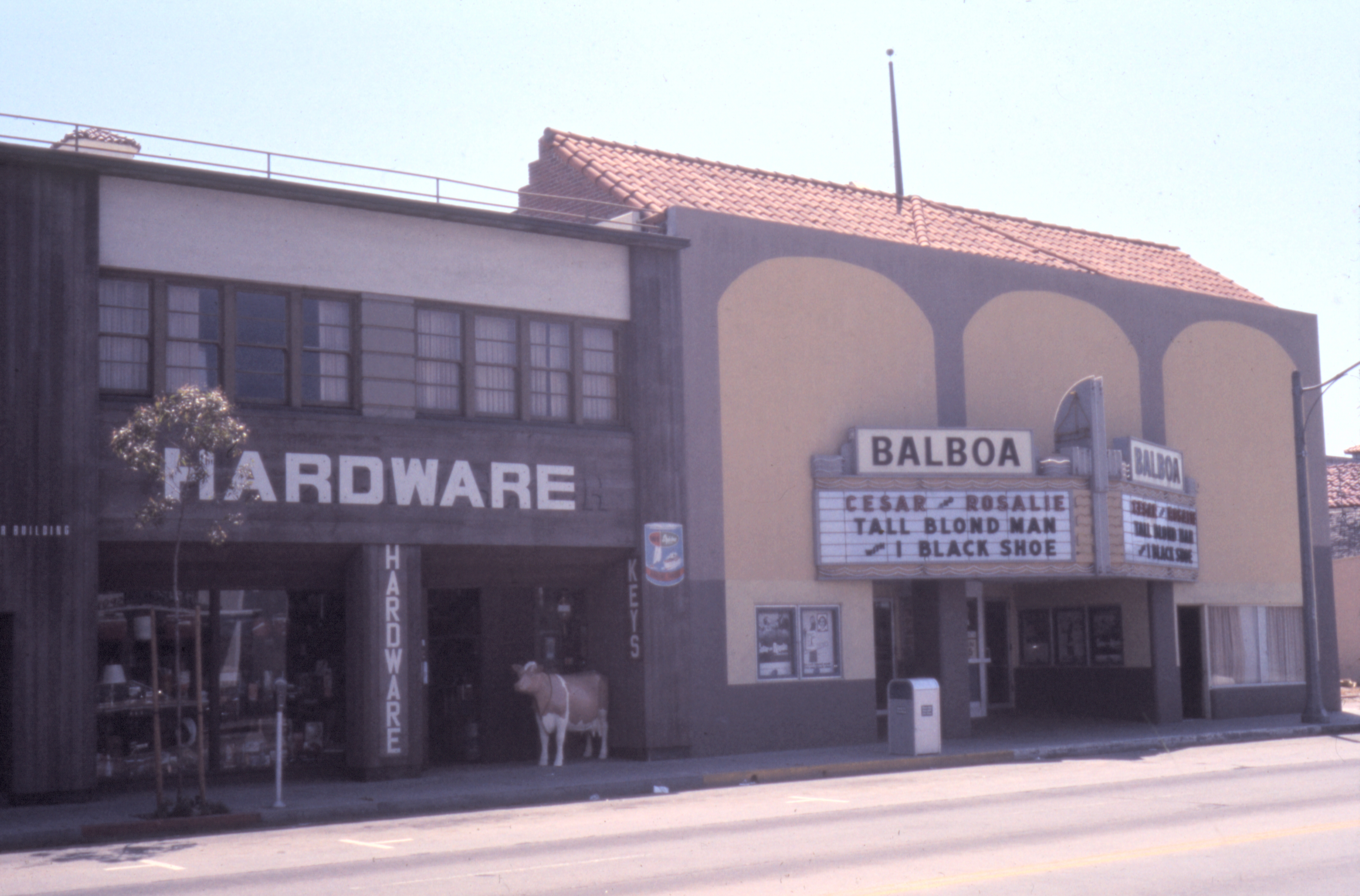
- The Balboa Theater (right) in 1974
- Interactive map of Balboa Theater
- Former names: Ritz Theater; Balboa Pussycat Theater
- Address: 707 E. Balboa Boulevard; Newport Beach, California; U.S.
- Coordinates: 33°36′07″N 117°54′00″W
- Owner: LAB Holding

Construction
- Opened: March 17, 1928; 98 years ago
- Closed: December 1, 1991; 34 years ago

The Balboa Theater is a historic former movie theater on the Balboa Peninsula in Newport Beach, California. Opened as the Ritz Theater in 1928, it screened mainstream film for 47 years. In 1975, Pussycat Theaters acquired the venue and converted it to an adult movie theater to the ire of residents and city officials. The Pussycat operation became the subject of several police raids and an eventual criminal court trial for its exhibition of pornographic films. In 1979, Landmark Theatres became the Balboa's operator, operating it as an arthouse theater. The Balboa Theater screened its final movie in 1991 and remains closed despite attempts to reopen it.

== History ==
On March 17, 1928, the Ritz Theater opened for the first time. It operated under its original name until 1939 when it was renamed Balboa Theater.

On December 23, 1969, Newport Beach police seized a reel of the controversial Swedish erotic film I Am Curious (Yellow) from the Balboa Theater just before its second showtime. A municipal judge, representatives from the county district attorney's office, and police officers were present at the first screening of the film, leading to the stoppage of subsequent showtimes.

In April 1975, the Balboa became part of the Pussycat Theaters chain of adult movie theaters. A month later, police acted on a warrant from a county judge and seized two pornographic film reels, French Blue and Dynamite, from the theater. City police chief B. James Glavas said that he acted on protests from Newport Beach residents and the Orange County District Attorney's office announced it was prepared to prosecute the theater for exhibiting obscene material. The theater continued to operate the next day.

Although the Pussycat Theater remained in operation at the Balboa, police continued to crack down on its film showings – by June 25, 1975, authorities had conducted five raids in four weeks. In July 1975, the issue was presented to a judge and the district attorney's office requested a warrant to seize additional copies of already-seized films for the pending obscenity trial; theater officials alleged that the request was meant to censor the theater rather than collect evidence. On July 29, the judge ruled that police were not limited in how many copies of a film they could seize and set August 26 as the date for the trial.

On August 28, 1975, a trial to determine whether the Pussycat Balboa Theater violated local norms by exhibiting Deep Throat and The Devil in Miss Jones began, charging the theater chain owners and manager with 22 counts of showing obscene films. On September 26, a judge acquitted chain vice president Jimmie Johnson but upheld charges against the owner and theater manager. On October 9, a 12-person jury unanimously voted to acquit the Pussycat defendants on all charges.

Despite the trial acquittal, city police continued to seize films from the Balboa Pussycat: officials confiscated reels of When a Woman Calls and Sex Ray Machine during a raid in November 1975, allegedly because they contained homosexual content. On December 18, 1975, an arsonist attempted to burn down the Balboa Theater. The fire was extinguished quickly and the building only received minor damage.

In November 1976, the parent company of Pussycat Theaters decided to retain ownership of the Balboa but cease the screening of adult films. The organization selected Great Western Theaters to operate the venue and show mainstream cinema. In 1979, Landmark Theatres acquired the lease on the Balboa. The operator featured showtimes for cult classic films until 1985 when it switched arthouse and foreign film programming. On December 1, 1991, the Balboa Theater permanently closed following the expiration of Landmark's lease.

Attempts to reopen the Balboa began not long after its 1991 closure. In 1998, the city of Newport Beach acquired the property for about US$450,000 and rented it to Balboa Performing Arts Theater Foundation, a nonprofit tasked with the building's renovation, for $1 per year. The renovation would require the installation of a new interior as the original was gutted amidst the closure. In 2015, the city contemplated selling the property after a proposed $5.8 million renovation plan was deemed too expensive. In April 2016, the Newport city council voted unanimously to sell the property to LAB Holding, the developer of the LAB Anti-Mall in Costa Mesa and the Anaheim Packing House food court. LAB Holding proprietor Shaheen Sadeghi announced plans to redevelop the Balboa Theater building as a music venue. In 2018, the plans were postponed.

== The Rocky Horror Picture Show ==
Beginning in 1978, the Balboa Theater hosted seven-day-a-week midnight showings of The Rocky Horror Picture Show, continuing the tradition until the venue's closure in 1991. The Balboa hence became a hotspot for the film's cult following, typically drawing hundreds of fans and forming a line down the street to get in. Rocky Horror fans attending showtimes at the Balboa often attended dressed in costume, would recite dialogue from the film, and threw food at the screen during "appropriate moments". Upon the Balboa's closure, Landmark Theatres relocated the midnight showings of the film to its venue in Corona del Mar.

== See also ==
- Lido Theater (Newport Beach)
