= Sal Piro =

American actor (1950–2023)

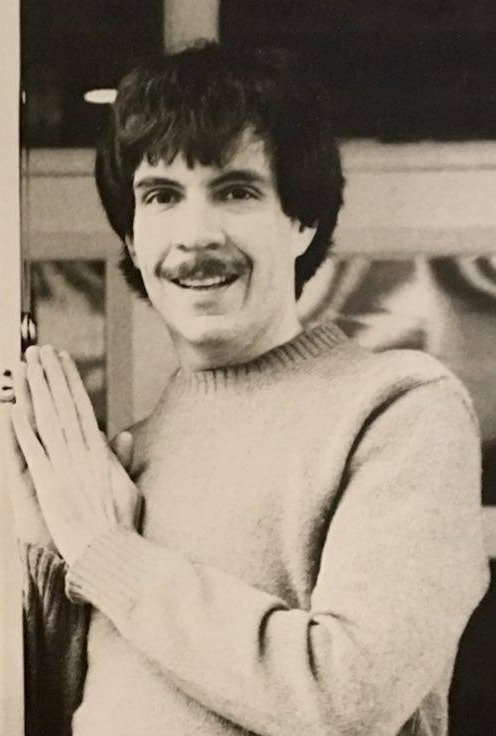
- Born: Salvatore Francis Martin Piro; June 29, 1950; Jersey City, New Jersey, U.S.
- Died: January 22, 2023 (aged 72); New York City, U.S.
- Occupations: Actor; theatre director; teacher
- Known for: President of The Rocky Horror Picture Show Fan Club

Salvatore Francis Martin Piro (June 29, 1950 – January 22, 2023) was an American actor who was the president of The Rocky Horror Picture Show Fan Club, a position he held from 1977 until his death. Piro's 1990 book Creatures of the Night, about The Rocky Horror Picture Show's cult following, is set to be adapted into a film.

== Theatre career ==
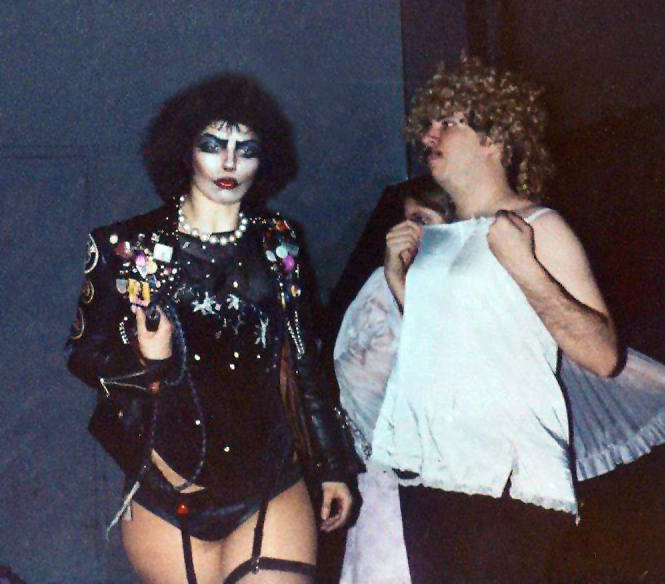
Dori Hartley (in costume as Dr. Frank-N-Furter) and Sal Piro (as Janet Weiss) at the Waverly Theater, New York City, New York during a screening of The Rocky Horror Picture Show

Piro was a part of the original Waverly Theatre audience for The Rocky Horror Picture Show. Piro would shout humorous responses to the show's dialogue, from which the unique audience participation elements and much of the film's cult following were born. He was later instrumental in getting the venue moved to the 8th St. Playhouse. The Rocky Horror Picture Show's following has become a worldwide phenomenon.

Piro appeared as himself in the 1980 film Fame as well as in several documentaries, and had a nonspeaking, unnamed cameo as a man using a payphone in Rocky Horror's pseudo-sequel Shock Treatment. He also cameoed as "The Photographer" in the 2016 television remake of The Rocky Horror Picture Show. As an actor, he performed in both film and television.

Piro wrote two books about the Rocky Horror cult following, Creatures of the Night and Creatures of the Night II. Creatures of the Night is in development to be adapted into a film, with Adam Schroeder, Lou Adler, and Jill Mazursky set to produce. Mark Loughlin is writing the screenplay.

== Personal life ==
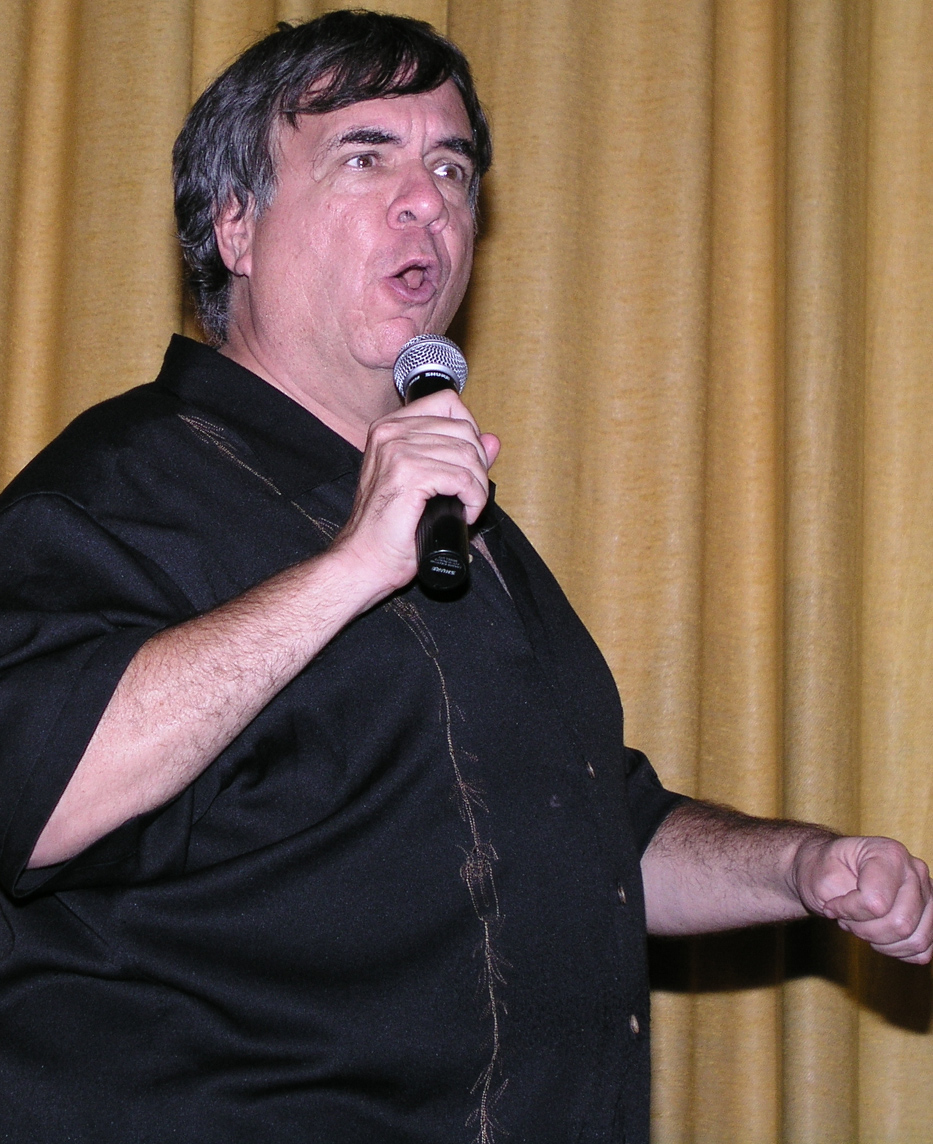
Piro representing the Rocky Horror Picture Show Fan Club at the 2006 Queens of the Desert convention in Tucson, Arizona

Salvatore Francis Martin Piro was born in Jersey City, New Jersey, in 1950. He attended Seton Hall University. In the mid-1970s, he was a theology teacher and theater director at Catholic schools in New Jersey. He was gay.

In Cherry Grove, New York, on Fire Island, Piro managed the Ice Palace and Grove Hotel for 23 years and executive produced the Miss Fire Island Pageant, Mr. Fire Island Leather, and the Miss Grove Hotel contest. He also played competitive tournament chess and Scrabble.

Piro died from an aneurysm at his home in Manhattan on January 22, 2023, at the age of 72.
