= Kristian Lavercombe =

Welsh-born actor and singer

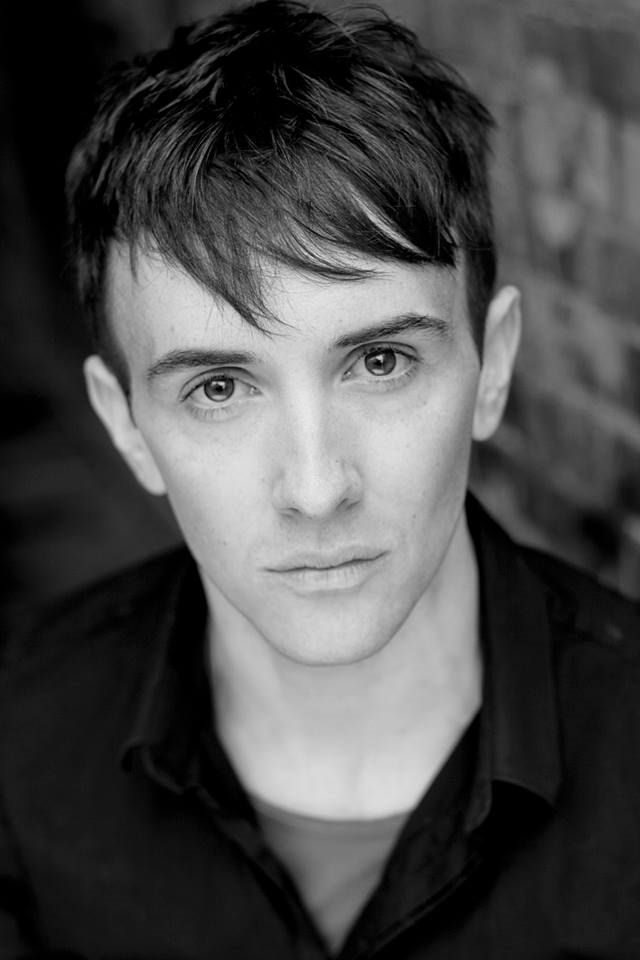
Kristian Lavercombe

Kristian Lavercombe is a Welsh-born actor and singer best known for playing Riff Raff in over 2600 performances of The Rocky Horror Show. Described by the show's writer Richard O'Brien as "a fantastically talented Riff Raff", Lavercombe's interpretation of the role has variously been described as "deliciously sleazy", "simply perfection" and "consistently the most watchable thing on stage throughout".

== Early life ==
Originally from Neath in South Wales and the son of Gerald Lavercombe and Janice (née Cook), Lavercombe attended Nayland College and trained at the National Academy of Singing and Dramatic Art in New Zealand; an early role was playing Frank 'n' Furter in Rocky Horror in New Zealand.

== Career ==
Lavercombe has performed as Riff Raff in The Rocky Horror Show 2622 times including during the International Tour (2010); the Australian Tour (2014–2015); the UK's 40th Anniversary Tour (2015); during a West End live cinema broadcast in 2015 with Richard O'Brien, the show's writer; the 2016 UK Tour, the Australian Tour (2018), the UK Tour (2018-2019), the South African Tour (2019-2020) and the UK and World Tour (2021-2022)

In addition to Riff Raff, Lavercombe has had leading roles in over 30 professional productions including Jesus in Jesus Christ Superstar (2014) for the Auckland Theatre Company and in which he was described as "an authentic musical theatre performer of equally impressive singer-actor ability"; Bobby Strong in Urinetown (2007) for Downstage Theatre of which a reviewer wrote "Kristian Lavercombe as Bobby not only sings and dances better than most leading men but he also does the comedy with style"; Cripple Billy in The Cripple of Inishmaan for The Court Theatre; Puck in Mendelssohn's A Midsummer Night's Dream for Christchurch Arts Festival ("As Puck, in semblance of a naughty Welsh faun, Kristian Lavercombe was a ball of energy"); and The Dark Lady in the New Zealand tour of This Holy Fire of Love with the New Zealand Symphony Orchestra. In 2018, Lavercombe joined the Australian tour of Rocky Horror as Riff Raff opposite Craig McLachlan as Frank N. Furter. In December 2018, he commenced a yearlong UK tour as Riff Raff in Rocky Horror. In 2020, he played Frankie Valli in Jersey Boys at the Court Theatre in New Zealand. In 2021 he once again appeared as Riff Raff in the UK tour of The Rocky Horror Show. On March 15 2022 he performed his 2,000th performance of The Rocky Horror Show; this includes 6 as Narrator. 43 as Frank'n'Furter. 72 as Brad Majors and 1,879 as Riff Raff.

== Personal life ==
Lavercombe currently lives in Brixton in London.
