= Philip Kemi =

Swedish ice hockey player

- Born: March 2, 1991 (age 34) Kiruna, Sweden
- Height: 5 ft 9 in (175 cm)
- Weight: 181 lb (82 kg; 12 st 13 lb)
- Position: Defence
- Shoots: Left
- SEL team: Luleå HF
- NHL draft: Undrafted
- Playing career: 2011–present

Philip Kemi (born March 2, 1991) is a Swedish professional ice hockey defenceman who currently plays for Luleå HF of the Elitserien.
