= Charles Gray (actor) =

British actor (1928–2000)

- Gray as Dikko Henderson in You Only Live Twice (1967)
- Born: Donald Marshall Gray; 29 August 1928; Bournemouth, Hampshire, England, UK
- Died: 7 March 2000 (aged 71); London, England, UK
- Other name: Oliver Gray
- Occupation: Actor
- Years active: 1957–1998

Donald Marshall Gray (29 August 1928 – 7 March 2000), known professionally as Charles Gray, was an English actor. Gray was best known for playing Ernst Stavro Blofeld in Diamonds Are Forever, Dikko Henderson in You Only Live Twice, Mycroft Holmes in The Adventures of Sherlock Holmes, The Criminologist in The Rocky Horror Picture Show and as Judge Oliver Wright in the 1981 sequel Shock Treatment.

== Early life ==
Donald Marshall Gray was born on 29 August 1928 in Bournemouth, Hampshire (present-day Dorset) to surveyor Donald Gray (died 1975), who had served as a captain in the Royal Engineers, and Maude Elizabeth (née Marshall). Gray attended Bournemouth School alongside Benny Hill, whose school had been evacuated to the same buildings, during the Second World War. Some of his friends remember that his bedroom walls were plastered with pictures of film stars.

== Stage career ==
By his mid-twenties, Gray had left his first job as a clerk for an estate agent to become an actor. He began his stage experience at the theatre club next to the Palace Court Hotel in Bournemouth, where he was a last-minute cast replacement in The Beaux' Stratagem. Gray surprised everyone, including himself, with the quality of his performance. He later made his first professional stage appearance under his given name, Donald Gray, as Charles the Wrestler in Roger Atkins' production of As You Like It. He moved away from Bournemouth in the late 1950s but his parents remained at the family home until their deaths.

On becoming a professional actor, Gray had to change his name, as there was already an actor named Donald Gray. He chose Charles Gray partly because Charles was the name of his maternal grandfather, partly because he had a close friend named Charles, and partly because he thought it sounded nice. For his first appearance on Broadway, in the 1961 musical Kean, he went under the name Oliver Gray.

Gray distinguished himself in theatrical roles, in the Regent's Park Open Air Theatre, London, at the Royal Shakespeare Company, Stratford-Upon-Avon and at the Old Vic. He received his vocal training at the RSC and became noted for his imposing presence.

== Film and television ==
During the 1960s, Gray established himself as a successful character actor and made many appearances on British television. Work in this period included Danger Man with Patrick McGoohan and Maigret. Gray also appeared opposite Laurence Olivier in the film version of The Entertainer (1960) as a reporter. His breakthrough year was 1967, when he starred with Peter O'Toole and Omar Sharif in the Second World War murder-mystery film The Night of the Generals. The same year, he played Dikko Henderson, a British intelligence officer assigned to their Embassy in Tokyo, in the James Bond film You Only Live Twice (1967). Four years later, he appeared as Ernst Stavro Blofeld in the Bond film Diamonds Are Forever (1971), both films starring Sean Connery as James Bond.

Gray's most prolific work as an actor was between 1968 and 1979, when he appeared in more than forty major film and television productions. From this period, he is perhaps best known for portraying the Criminologist (the narrator) in The Rocky Horror Picture Show and a similar character, Judge Oliver Wright, in its sequel Shock Treatment (1981). This more expansive role is said to be the same character (the Criminologist in The Rocky Horror Picture Show is not named). In 1973, he played Lord Seacroft in the television series The Upper Crusts opposite Margaret Leighton and in 1983, he starred alongside Coral Browne and Alan Bates in the award-winning made-for-TV film An Englishman Abroad. In 1985, he starred in an episode of the BBC-TV detective series Bergerac, entitled "What Dreams May Come?". Other well-known film work includes The Devil Rides Out, Mosquito Squadron, Cromwell and The Beast Must Die. In 1991, Gray co-starred with Oliver Tobias in the science-fiction film Firestar: First Contact for Ice International Films.

== Later work ==
Gray portrayed Mycroft Holmes in both the film The Seven-Per-Cent Solution (1976) and opposite Jeremy Brett's Sherlock Holmes in four episodes of the Granada Television series The Adventures of Sherlock Holmes (1984-1994). In two episodes of the final Brett series, The Memoirs of Sherlock Holmes, he had leading roles as Mycroft because Edward Hardwicke, who played Dr. John Watson, was busy on another project and the second as a result of Brett's illness.

Other television appearances included roles in Dennis Potter's Blackeyes, The New Statesman, Thriller, Upstairs, Downstairs, Bergerac, Porterhouse Blue plus a range of Shakespearean roles, such as Julius Caesar in Julius Caesar and Pandarus in Troilus and Cressida. He dubbed for Jack Hawkins in the films Theatre of Blood, When Eight Bells Toll, Tales That Witness Madness and others after Hawkins' larynx was removed to combat throat cancer.

== Death ==
Gray died of cancer at a London hospital, on 7 March 2000, at the age of 71.

== Selected filmography ==
- Highway Patrol (1956) as Steve
- I Accuse! (1958) as Capt. Brossard
- Heart of a Child (1958) as Fritz Heiss
- Official Detective (1958) Episode: "Extortion" as King
- The Desperate Man (1959) as Dawson
- Follow a Star (1959) as Man at Party (uncredited)
- Tommy the Toreador (1959) as Gomez
- The Entertainer (1960) as Columnist
- Man in the Moon (1960) as Leo
- Masquerade (1965) as Benson
- The Night of the Generals (1967) as General Herbert von Seidlitz-Gabler
- You Only Live Twice (1967) as Dikko Henderson
- The Man Outside (1967) as Charles Griddon
- The Secret War of Harry Frigg (1968) as Gen. Adrian Cox-Roberts
- The Devil Rides Out (1968) as Mocata
- The Nine Ages of Nakedness (1969) as Narrator (voice)
- The File of the Golden Goose (1969) as The Owl
- Mosquito Squadron (1969) as Air Commodore Hufford
- The Executioner (1970) as Vaughan Jones
- Cromwell (1970) as Robert Devereux, 3rd Earl of Essex
- When Eight Bells Toll (1971) as Sir Anthony Skouras (uncredited voice)
- Diamonds Are Forever (1971) as Ernst Stavro Blofeld
- Theatre of Blood (1973) as Solomon Psaltery (uncredited voice)
- Tales That Witness Madness (1973) as Dr. Nicholas (uncredited voice)
- On the Game (1974) as Narrator (voice)
- The Beast Must Die (1974) as Arthur Bennington
- Fall of Eagles (1974) as Mikhail Rodzianko
- The Rocky Horror Picture Show (1975) as The Criminologist
- Seven Nights in Japan (1976) as Henry Hollander
- The Seven-Per-Cent Solution (1976) as Mycroft Holmes
- Three Dangerous Ladies as Mr. Santander
- Silver Bears (1978) as Charles Cook
- Richard II (1978) as Richard of Shrewsbury, Duke of York
- The Legacy (1978) as Karl Liebnecht
- The Mirror Crack'd (1980) as Bates
- Ticket to Heaven (1981) as Musician
- Shock Treatment (1981) as Judge Oliver Wright
- Charles & Diana: A Royal Love Story (1982) as John Spencer, 8th Earl Spencer
- The Jigsaw Man (1983) as Sir James Chorley
- The Gourmet (1984) as Manley Kingston
- Bergerac (1985) as Bart Bellow
- Harry and Harriet (1990) as Satan
- Firestar: First Contact (1991) as Commodore Vandross
- The Beano Video (1993) as Narrator #4 (voice)
- The Tichborne Claimant (1998) as Arundell
