= Rocky Interactive Horror Show =

1999 video game

- European cover art
- Developers: On-Line Entertainment; Transylvania Interactive
- Publisher: On-Line Entertainment
- Producers: Andy Leighton; Michael Hodges; Peter Donebauer
- Designers: Clement Chambers; Joe Fisher
- Programmers: Jon Mullins; Marcus Hamilton; Sebastian Haig
- Artists: Mark Khan; Wayne Kresil
- Writer: Richard O'Brien
- Composers: Andrew Hewson; Simon Kidman
- Series: The Rocky Horror Show
- Platform: Microsoft Windows
- Release: EU: 1 March 1999; NA: November 2000
- Genre: Adventure
- Mode: Single-player

Rocky Interactive Horror Show is a point-and-click adventure game developed by On-Line Entertainment in conjunction with Transylvania Interactive and published by On-Line exclusively for Microsoft Windows. A spiritual successor to CRL Group's 1985 video game adaptation, it is the second video game to be released and based upon creator and star Richard O'Brien's musical of the same name. Following the plot from 20th Century Fox's 1975 musical horror comedy film of the same name, the player assume the role of either Brad Majors or Janet Weiss in order to rescue one of the two playable characters, who has been transformed into stone by Dr. Frank-N-Furter's Medusa Transducer, within a set time limit before the mansion becomes a spaceship and takes off to the planet Transsexual Transylvania.

Taking over four years to create and developed as a joint production through Transylvania Interactive with On-Line, Rocky Interactive Horror Show was originally announced in 1995 and began as a project intended for both the Atari Jaguar CD and PC, which were planned to be published by Atari Corporation and Atari Interactive respectively, however due to the commercial failure of the Atari Jaguar platform in the market and the closure of the then-newly formed PC publishing division as a result of Atari Corp. merging with JT Storage in 1996, left the Jaguar CD version unreleased and the PC version shelved until it was released by On-Line for Windows in 1999. Series creator Richard O'Brien was heavily involved in its production, in addition of casting himself as one of the in-game characters.

Upon its release, Rocky Interactive Horror Show garnered mixed reception from critics who gave praise to multiple aspects such as the humor, campiness and surreal nature, with many singling out the audio as the game's most strong point, but was criticized for the clumsy user interface, gameplay, presentation and outdated visuals. A PlayStation conversion was announced and planned to be published alongside the Windows version, but it never released for unknown reasons.

== Gameplay ==
Gameplay screenshot.

As with the previously released 1985 title by CRL Group and following the plot from the 1975 film, Rocky Interactive Horror Show is a graphic adventure game similar to LucasArts' 1987 Maniac Mansion, in which the player uses a point-and-click interface to guide characters through a two-dimensional game world, traversing through a series of rooms to solve and complete puzzles in order to rescue one of the two playable characters, depending on the choice from players at the beginning of the game (either Brad or Janet), who has been turned into stone by Dr. Frank-N-Furter's Medusa Transducer machine within a 30-minute time limit before the mansion where the game takes place transforms into a spaceship and takes off to the planet Transsexual Transylvania. At certain points during the game, the players will be either greeted by the Narrator (played by Christopher Lee), who will offer help to the player or be mocked by the Game Devil (played by O'Brien).

== Development and release ==
Rocky Interactive Horror Show initially began and was announced as a project intended for the Atari Jaguar CD peripheral and later for PC in 1995, which was a joint-production between On-Line Entertainment and Transylvania Interactive. Although the Jaguar CD version remained to be listed across multiple issues of online magazine Atari Explorer Online up until their last issue published in January 1996, in addition of internal documents from Atari Corp. listing the project as in development in December 1995 and with the then-recently formed Atari Interactive announcing their plans to publish the PC version, Atari would ultimately start cancelling upcoming titles for the Jaguar in February 1996 and closing their PC publishing division before merging with JT Storage in a reverse takeover on April of the same year, which left the Jaguar CD version unreleased and the PC version shelved as a result. In a 2018 interview, former Atari designer and producer Dan McNamee revealed that he became an associate producer of the project to work alongside series creator Richard O'Brien on the project at the United Kingdom prior to the layoffs.

Rocky Interactive Horror Show for PC would be set to be released during the Christmas season of 1998, before being eventually published by On-Line in Europe on March 1, 1999, and later in North America in November 2000. A PlayStation conversion was also announced and planned to be published alongside the Windows version around the same time, but it was never released for unknown reasons. The game was narrated by Christopher Lee and versions of the title also came bundled with a walkthrough of how to complete it. The game's CD-ROM itself also doubles as a music CD. In 2004, a non-playable demo of Rocky Interactive Horror Show on Jaguar CD was released by the defunct Jaguar Sector II website under a CD compilation titled Jaguar Extremist Pack #2.

== Reception ==
Reception

Review scores
Publication	Score
IGN	5.3 / 10
AllGame	3/5
Bonusweb	4 / 10
Just Adventure	B−
Metzomagic	3.5/5
Muzik	8 / 10
PC Joker	38%

Muzik noted the title offered audiovisual delights that may surprise the player. David Freeman of Rocky Horror fansite TimeWarp felt it would appeal to Rocky fans but would not convert anyone to the franchise, and praised the title's graphics. Bonusweb praised the musical motifs for adding to the game's comic atmosphere. Meztomagic deemed the game a novelty with a lot of charm. IGN felt the game had merit on a kitsch level, but that it was not particularly impressive as an adventure game. PC Gamer felt that while the game was very strange, it was beaten in its strangeness by other On-Line games such as Psycho Killer and The Town With No Name. Topless Robot felt it was an improvement over the preceding Rocky Horror video game from 1985. Sarah Wilson (YouTube vlogger PushingUpRoses) felt the gameplay was "stupid".
