= Kentucky Employers' Mutual Insurance =

Kentucky Employer's Mutual Insurance
- Industry: insurance
- Founded: 1995
- Headquarters: Lexington, Kentucky
- Key people: Jon Stewart (President & CEO)

Kentucky Employers' Mutual Insurance (KEMI) is a workers' compensation insurance company in Lexington, Kentucky. KEMI was created in 1995 and is the largest provider of workers' compensation insurance in Kentucky.

KEMI is a mutual insurance company owned by its policyholders. KEMI is financed entirely by premium dollars and investment income. All workers' compensation insurance companies in Kentucky, including KEMI, are regulated by the Kentucky Department of Insurance and the Kentucky Department of Workers' Claims.

== Leadership ==
Jon Stewart, President and CEO

== Recognition ==
- KEMI was rated A− "Excellent" by A.M. Best for the sixteenth consecutive year (2016).
- KEMI was recognized by Ward Group in 2010 for achieving outstanding financial results in the areas of safety, consistency, and performance.
- KEMI was honored by Business Insurance magazine and the Best Companies Group as a first-place winner in the 2010 Best Places to Work in Insurance competition. KEMI ranked highest among other small-sized property and casualty insurers from across the nation.
- KEMI won the Alfred P. Sloan Award for Business Excellence in Workplace Flexibility in 2010.
- KEMI won the We CARE Award from Republic Bank in 2010 for encouraging employees to become involved in volunteer activities and supporting community-based initiatives through philanthropic efforts and neighborhood assistance.
