= The Rocky Horror Picture Show cult following =

Cultural phenomenon surrounding the film's large fan base

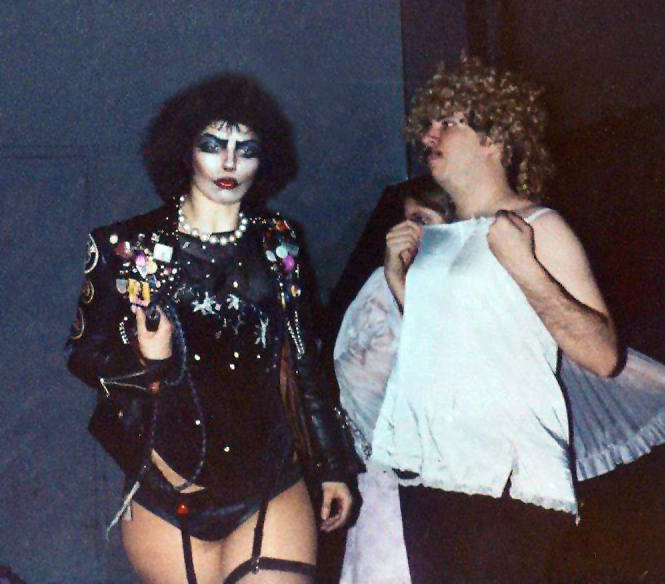
Dori Hartley and Sal Piro at the Waverly Theater in New York City, 1977

The Rocky Horror Picture Show cult following is the cultural phenomenon surrounding the large fan base of enthusiastic participants of the 1975 movie The Rocky Horror Picture Show, generally credited as being the best-known cinematic "midnight movie".

== History and background ==
The film The Rocky Horror Picture Show came about due to the tremendous success of the stage musical The Rocky Horror Show and opened in the United States at the United Artists Theater in Westwood, Los Angeles, California, on September 26, 1975. Although the theater was selling out every night, it was noted that many of the same people were returning to see the movie. This audience turned out to be an exception, however, and it did not do well elsewhere in the US.

The film was then re-launched as a midnight movie, beginning its run at the Waverly Theater in New York City on April 1, 1976. The Riverside Twin in Austin, Texas, became the second location to run the film as a midnighter. Over time, people began shouting responses to the characters' statements on the screen. Schoolteacher Louis Farese, Jr., Theresa Krakauskas and Amy Lazarus, who attended together at the Waverly, are credited with having started the convention of talking back to the screen, bringing props and making up one-liners, the purpose of which was basically to make one another laugh. They had no idea that in doing so, they'd create something that would last decades. As Amy Lazarus once said, "we just trying to have a good time." (These mostly included puns, or pop culture references.) A showing of the film at the 1976 World Science Fiction Convention spread its fame to a new cadre of enthusiasts.

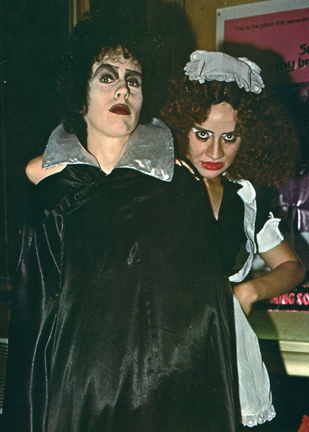
D. Garrett Gafford and Terri Hardin at the Tiffany Theater in Hollywood, 1978

A part of audience reception can be recreating the art. This is how the fandom of Rocky Horror developed into a standardized ritual. The performances of the audience were scripted and actively discouraged improvising, being conformist in a similar way to the repressed characters. Rocky Horror helped shape conditions of cult film's transition from art-house to grind-house style. Early participation with the film took place at the original Westwood location of the film's first run with fans heard singing along. Waverly Theater fans in New York are credited with the call back lines. Performance groups became a staple at Rocky Horror screenings due in large part to the prominent New York City fan cast. The cast was originally run by former schoolteacher and stand-up comic Sal Piro and by Dori Hartley, one of several performers in a flexible, rotating cast to portray the character of Frank N. Furter, shadowing the film above. According to J. Hoberman, author of Midnight Movies, it was after five months into the film's midnight run when lines began to be yelled by the audience. The first person to yell out an audience participation line during a screening was Louis Farese Jr., a normally quiet teacher who, upon seeing the character Janet place a newspaper over her head to protect herself from rain, yelled, "Buy an umbrella you cheap bitch". This self-proclaimed "counter point dialogue" was soon helped into standardization by Piro and repeated nearly verbatim at each screening. By that Halloween, people were attending in costume and talking back to the screen. By the end of 1979, there were twice-weekly showings at over 230 theatres.

The National Fan Club began in 1977 and would merge with the International Fan Club; the fan publication The Transylvanian printed a number of issues. A semi-regular poster magazine was published as well as an official magazine.

The Los Angeles area performance groups originated in 1977 at the Fox Theatre, where Michael Wolfson, portraying Frank, won a look-alike contest, as well as another at the Tiffany Theater on Sunset Blvd. Wolfson's group would perform in all of the LA area theaters screening Rocky Horror, including the Balboa Theater in Balboa, The Cove at Hermosa Beach and The Sands in Glendale, and was invited to perform at the Sombrero Playhouse in Phoenix, Arizona. At the Tiffany Theatre, the audience performance cast had the theater's full cooperation; the local performers entered early and without charge. The Frank N. Furter for this theatre was performed by a transgender performer. D. Garret Gafford, was out of work in 1978, trying to raise enough funds for gender confirmation surgery while spending the weekends performing at the Tiffany.

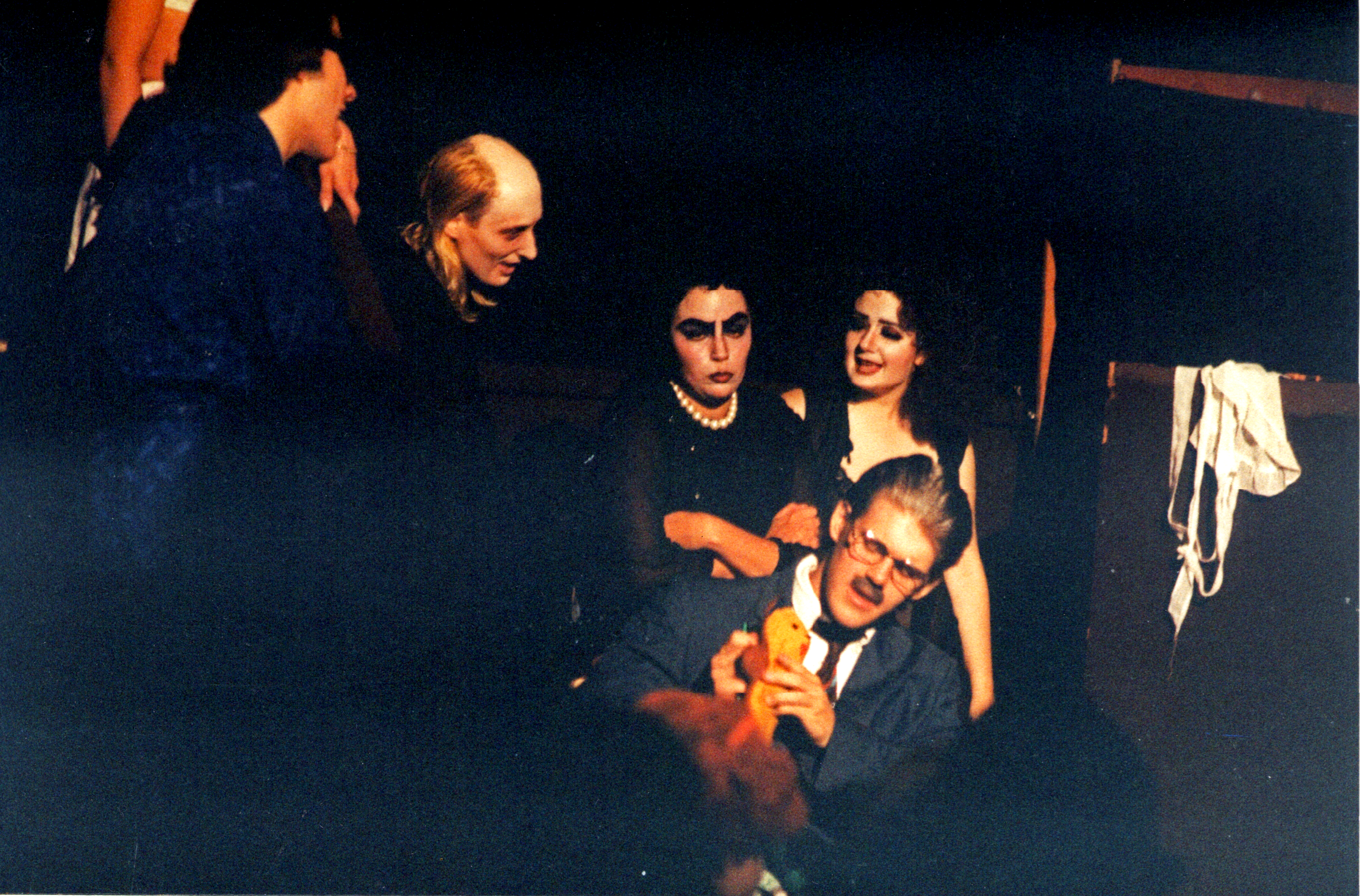
San Francisco's Strand Theatre, 1979. Linda Woods, Marni Scofidio, Denise Erickson and Tim Curry

In San Francisco Rocky Horror would move from one location to the Strand Theatre located near the Tenderloin on Market Street. The performance group there would act out and perform almost the entire film, unlike the New York cast at that time. The Strand cast was put together from former members of the Berkeley group, disbanded due to less than enthusiastic management. Their Frank N. Furter was portrayed by Marni Scofidio who, in 1979, got many of the older group from Berkeley over to San Francisco. Other members included Mishell Erickson and her twin sister Denise Erickson, who portrayed Columbia and Magenta, Kathy Dolan playing Janet and Linda Woods as Riff Raff. The Strand group had performed at two large science fiction conventions, in Los Angeles and San Francisco, and were offered a spot at The Mabuhay, a local punk club; and even performed for children's television in Argentina.

In Denver, Rocky Horror screened at the Ogden Theatre before moving to the Esquire Theatre around 1992, where it continued as part of the theater's weekly Midnight Madness series until the Esquire's closure in July 2024. Denver was one of only five American cities (alongside New York, San Francisco, Houston, and Los Angeles) that could claim a quarter-century of continuous showings by the year 2000. The all-volunteer shadow cast Colorado's Elusive Ingredient performed at the Esquire beginning in 2000; in 2013, the cast set the world record for the largest Rocky Horror Picture Show performance, with more than 8,500 people attending a screening at Red Rocks Amphitheatre.

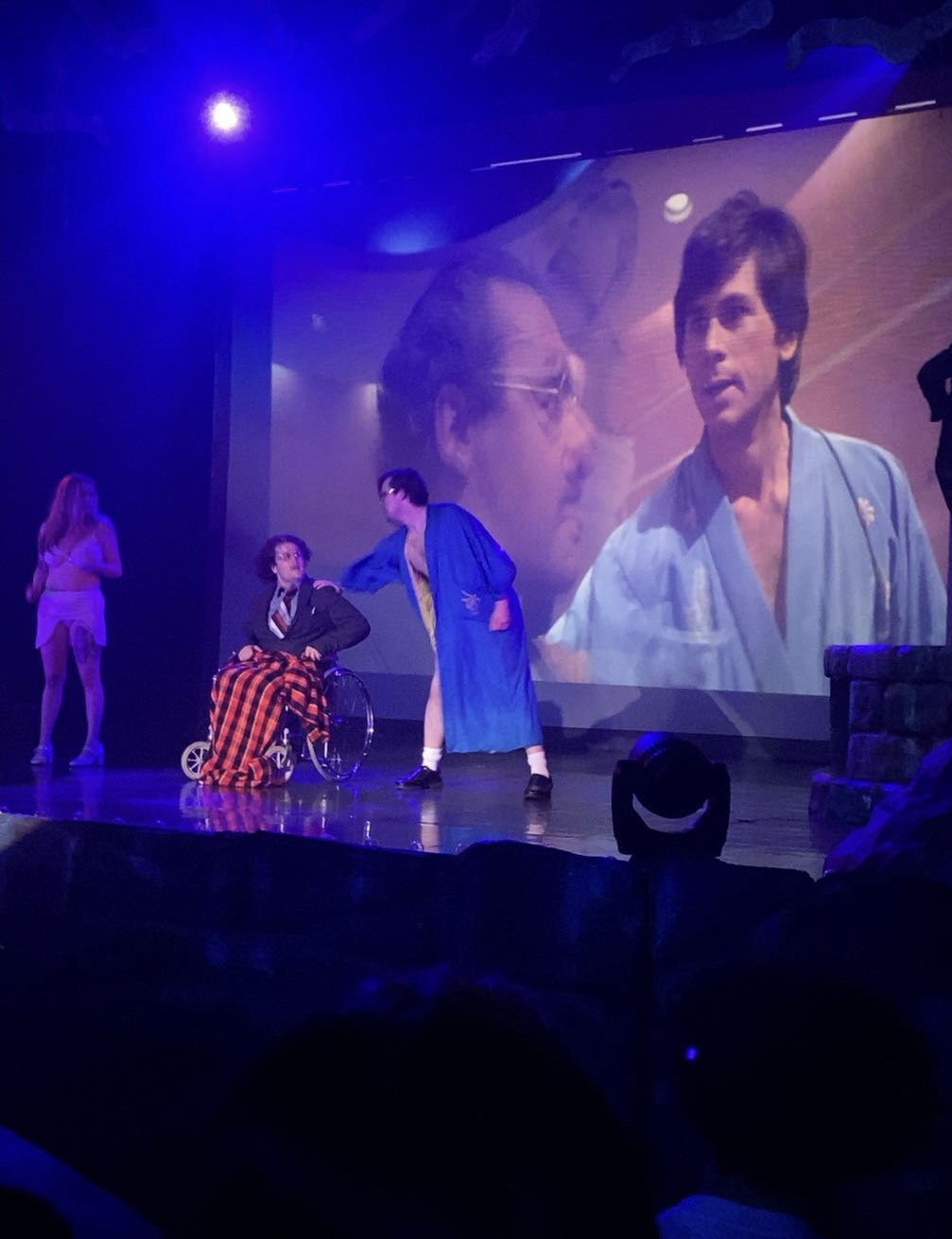
RHPS performance at Six Flags St. Louis during Fright Fest

Annual Rocky Horror conventions are held in varying locations lasting days. Tucson, Arizona has hosted a few times including 1999 with “El Fishnet Fiesta”, and “Queens of the Desert” held in 2006. To the fans, Rocky Horror is a repeated cycle, of going home and coming back to see the film each weekend, making the practice a ritual of compulsive, re-affirmation of community that has been compared to a "religious event". The audience call backs are similar to responses in church during a mass. The Rocky Horror Picture Show has a global following and remains popular well into the 21st century, and the film's fan culture of cosplaying and audience participation during screenings laid the groundwork for the similarly influential cult following surrounding Tommy Wiseau's The Room (2003).

20th Century Fox, the distributor of The Rocky Horror Picture Show, had a longstanding policy that offered most of the films in its archive to any theater who requested it, thus allowing older films to receive theatrical showings far longer than other studios' films. As a result of this policy, and of the frequent requests for the film, it has remained in continuous circulation since its release. The Walt Disney Company ended this policy when it acquired 20th Century Fox in 2019, but it made an exception for The Rocky Horror Picture Show because of its long history (and, as commentators noted, because putting the film into the Disney Vault would likely cause a revolt against Disney).

== Audience participation ==
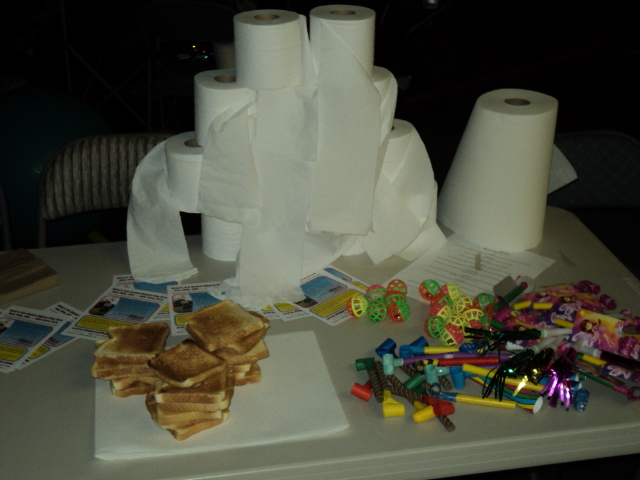
Some Rocky Horror paraphernalia set out at a Boise, Idaho showing in early 2011

The film gained popularity because of fan participation as much as anything else. "Shadow Casts" of fans acting out the entire movie below, or in some cases directly in front of the screen, are almost always present at showings. At the Strand Theatre in San Francisco, fans came to see a well-organized group coordinated by Grady Broyles, performing with sets and props like a professional theatre troupe. At the Tiffany Theater on Sunset Boulevard in Los Angeles, fans included a transgender individual performing as Frank N. Furter, just a few blocks away from the Roxy Theatre where The Rocky Horror Show made its American debut.

Audience participation also includes dancing the Time Warp along with the film, and throwing objects such as toast, water, toilet paper, hot dogs, and rice at appropriate points in the movie. Many theatres forbid throwing items that are difficult to clean up. In many cases, a total ban on throwing objects has been instituted due to severe damage to movie screens, or demand that the audience throw items up and backward to the seats behind them. Fans often attend shows in costume as the characters. At a now-defunct theater in New Orleans, the local "Eddie" would ride his motorcycle down the aisle during Meat Loaf's/Eddie's song, "Hot Patootie."

== Call backs ==
During a showing of Rocky Horror, ad-lib responses, more commonly known as call backs, are lines the audience may shout out in response to events occurring on screen, as a form of audience participation. In some venues, audience members who provide incorrect or poorly timed responses may find themselves angrily shouted down just as if they were being disruptive in a normal movie. However, creative new lines are usually applauded and even added to the local repertoire. There have been audience participation albums recorded and scripts published. However, most fans feel that it is preferable for responses to grow organically from the local culture.

== See also ==
- Clinton Street Theater, Portland, Oregon
- Neptune Theatre (Seattle), Washington
- Midnight circuit of The Room
