= Kimi and Ritz =

English pop vocal duo

- Kimi Wong and Richard O'Brien

Background information
- Origin: England
- Genres: Pop
- Years active: 1970s
- Formerly of: Richard O'Brien; Kimi Wong

Kimi and Ritz were a short-lived English pop vocal duo in the early 1970s, comprising Richard O'Brien (best known as the creator of cult stage musical The Rocky Horror Show) and his then-wife, Kimi Wong. Although the duo only recorded six songs (of which two were never even released), they have since acquired something of a cult reputation in the light of O'Brien's subsequent success as a performer and songwriter.

== Background ==
In 1971, Richard O'Brien and his girlfriend Kimi Wong were struggling actors, performing in the English touring production of the stage musical Hair. During this time they befriended fellow cast member John Sinclair and, through him, John's childhood friend Andrew (Andy) Leighton, a budding record engineer. When Sinclair left Hair after a knee injury, he and Leighton attempted to establish their own recording studio, and then co-founded a music publishing company, Druidcrest Music. By this time, Richard O'Brien had left the cast of Hair to join the original London production of Jesus Christ Superstar, although he soon left when the management disagreed over his interpretation of Herod. He and Kimi were married on 4 December 1971. After the birth of their son the following April, Kimi re-joined the cast of Hair (playing the featured role of Chrissie) while O'Brien stayed home and looked after their son while working on the script that would eventually become The Rocky Horror Show. During that time, John Sinclair and Andy Leighton were frequent visitors to O'Brien's flat and, after initially signing him to their publishing company, subsequently made him a full partner in it. The three men duly adopted the pseudonym of Andrew O'Bonzo to describe themselves, and launched a music production company, Rich Teaboy Productions.

== The singles ==
=== "Merry Christmas Baby"/"Eddie" ===
At a time when it was still common for pop performers to approach record companies to obtain a one-off contract to release a single on their label, Andrew O'Bonzo struck up a deal with Epic Records (a division of CBS Records) for Richard O'Brien and his wife Kimi to release two songs that he had written. Produced under the auspices of Rich Teaboy Productions, the songs were arranged by London musician Robin Sylvester, later to become a prominent session guitarist and (since 2003) bass player for Ratdog. The single, released on 7 December 1973 in mono, comprised an original Christmas song, "Merry Christmas Baby" (sung by Kimi, with some harmonies and a spoken interlude by O'Brien) and, on the B-side, Kimi's rendition of "Eddie" (aka "Eddie's Teddy"), one of the songs written for The Rocky Horror Show. The latter song, released the same year as the show's original London cast album, can rightly be considered as the first of innumerable cover versions of songs from the cult show.

Along with general release, copies of the debut single were also sold from the foyer of the King's Road Theatre in Chelsea, where The Rocky Horror Show was being performed at the time, and were later given away to crew members when work was completed on the show's 1975 film adaptation, The Rocky Horror Picture Show. According to Kimi Wong, the single sold about 12,000 copies and not only got onto the BBC radio playlist but also scored a complimentary review from John Peel, a leading DJ of the day. In an effort to generate further Christmas airplay, the single was re-issued around the same time the following year, on 22 November 1974. This version was remixed in stereo and has a shorter running time (it fades out earlier than the original release).

=== "I was in Love with Danny"/"Pseud's Corner" ===
During 1974, Rich Teaboy Productions secured a second one-off single deal from Epic Records. This time, the A-side was an original O'Brien composition with the lengthy title of "I was in love with Danny (but the crowd was in love with Dean)". Essentially a new take on the traditional teenage tragedy song, the song was performed as a duet and told the story of two competing race car drivers, one of whom was killed during the race. The B-side was "Pseud's Corner", named after a weekly column in the satirical magazine Private Eye, which featured a solo vocal by O'Brien and some complex word play in its dark and obscure lyrics. This time around, the songs were arranged by O'Brien's friend Richard Hartley, former keyboardist for The Tornados, who had also served as arranger and musical director for the original stage production of The Rocky Horror Show. The new single was released on 21 February 1975, but generated little attention or airplay.

=== "Liebesträume"/"There's A Light" ===
Rich Teaboy Productions subsequently recorded another two songs by Kimi and Ritz for possible release; however, this time CBS Records did not take up the option. The proposed A-side was an updated version of the "Liebesträume" by Franz Liszt, with new lyrics by O'Brien. The B-side was to be another selection from The Rocky Horror Show score – a version of "There's a Light" (aka "Over at the Frankenstein Place"), albeit re-arranged for a string section and a vocal chorus that included Wong, O'Brien, Belinda Sinclair and perhaps even John Sinclair and Andy Leighton themselves.

== Legacy ==
During this period, Rich Teaboy Productions oversaw the recording and release of one-off singles credited to other artists including Truth & Beauty, which featured Perry Bedden and Johnathan Kramer. Little Nell also contributed a vocal on the A-side of their lone single. The B-side contained a cover of "Touch-A, Touch-A Touch Me" (1974), Dicky Hart and the Palpitations, the only other Andrew O Bonzo single other than "Kimi And Ritz" to feature Richard O' Brien on lead vocal (1975), Rollox (1975) and Belinda Sinclair (with The Richard O'Brien Crusade) (1979). Although O'Brien himself was involved in these projects in various capacities (as a writer, co-writer and/or vocalist), he and his wife never again recorded under the name Kimi and Ritz. Wong appeared in The Rocky Horror Picture Show (1975) and in O'Brien's follow-up stage musical, T Zee (1976), before the couple divorced in 1979.

Since 1975, the three Kimi and Ritz singles have never been commercially re-issued in any format, although they were later included on a limited edition bootleg CD entitled Dark Refrains (1996), which consisted of rare Rocky Horror-related audio tracks. Both the original 7-inch vinyl releases, and the bootleg CD (of which only 35 copies were pressed) remain extremely rare and sought-after collector's items, particularly amongst fans of The Rocky Horror Show. In more recent years, the tracks (except for the still-unreleased "Liebesträume" and "There's a Light" recordings) have circulated as Internet downloads from various websites.

== Discography ==
- "Merry Christmas Baby" (R. O'Brien) b/w "Eddie" (R. O'Brien) – Epic S EPC 1971/EPC 1971 (1973)
- "Merry Christmas Baby (D J version)" (R. O'Brien) b/w "Eddie" (R. O'Brien) – Epic EPC 1971 (1974 re-issue)
- "I was in love with Danny (but the crowd was in love with Dean" (R. O'Brien) b/w "Pseud's Corner" (R. O'Brien) – Epic S EPC3018 (1975)
- "Liebesträume" (F. Liszt/R. O'Brien) b/w "There's a Light (R. O'Brien) – unreleased

== See also ==
- "Reasons to Be Cheerful, Part 3"
