= Richard O'Brien =

British-New Zealand writer and actor (born 1942)

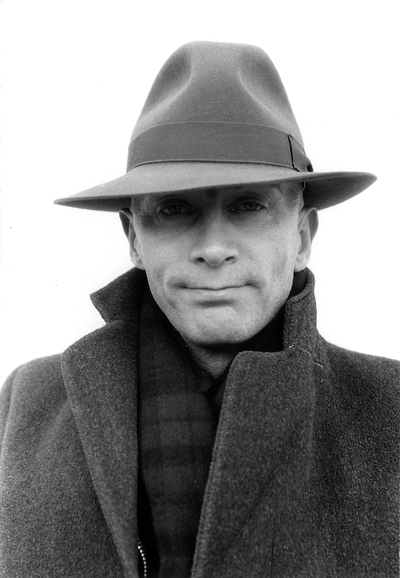
- O'Brien in 2008
- Born: Richard Timothy Smith; 25 March 1942 (age 84); Cheltenham, Gloucestershire, England
- Citizenship: United Kingdom; New Zealand (since 2011)
- Education: Tauranga Boys' College
- Occupations: Actor; writer; singer
- Spouses: Kimi Wong (m. 1971; div. 1979) Jane Moss (m. 1983; div. 2006) Sabrina Graf (m. 2013)
- Children: 3
- Writing career
- Years active: 1965–present

Richard O'Brien (born Richard Timothy Smith; 25 March 1942) is a British and New Zealand actor, writer and singer. He wrote the musical stage show The Rocky Horror Show in 1973, which has remained in continuous production. He also co-wrote the screenplay along with director Jim Sharman for the film adaptation, The Rocky Horror Picture Show (1975), and appeared on-screen as Riff Raff. O'Brien co-wrote the musical film Shock Treatment (1981) and appeared on-screen as Dr. Cosmo McKinley.

From 1990 to 1993, O'Brien presented the Channel 4 game show The Crystal Maze (1990–1993). He played the voice role of Lawrence Fletcher in the Disney Channel animated series Phineas and Ferb (2007–2015; 2025–present) and its two films (2011 and 2020). His other acting credits include Flash Gordon (1980), Spice World (1997), Ever After (1998), Dark City (1998), Dungeons & Dragons (2000), and Elvira's Haunted Hills (2001).

After a long and successful career based in the United Kingdom, O'Brien gained dual citizenship with New Zealand in 2011, where he resided in Tauranga. O'Brien identifies himself as third gender and uses he/him pronouns.

== Early life ==
O'Brien was born Richard Timothy Smith in Cheltenham, Gloucestershire. He emigrated with his family to Tauranga, New Zealand, at the age of 10, where his accountant father had purchased a sheep farm. He went to Tauranga Boys' College. It is known also that O'Brien attended Fairfield School in Hamilton, New Zealand in 1952. O'Brien worked as a barber at a barbershop in front of Hamilton's Embassy Theatre. It was at this theatre where O'Brien attended many late-night picture shows and had the idea for The Rocky Horror Picture Show. He returned to England in 1964, after having learned how to ride horses (a skill which provided him with his break into the film industry as a stuntman in Carry On Cowboy) and developing a keen interest in comic books and horror films. He launched his acting career using his mother's maiden name, O'Brien as there was already an actor named Richard Smith.

He says that his upbringing in New Zealand "instilled him with egalitarian ideals that helped him transcend British class restrictions".

== Career ==
To improve his acting skills, O'Brien took method acting classes, and then joined several stage productions as an actor. In 1970, he went into the touring production of Hair for nine months, and spent another nine months in the London production. In the summer of 1972, he met director Jim Sharman who cast him as an Apostle and Leper in the London production of Jesus Christ Superstar. O'Brien then took over the role of King Herod, but the producer disagreed with his interpretation and fired him after his first performance in the role. Sharman then cast O'Brien as Willie, the alien in his March 1973 production of Sam Shepard's The Unseen Hand at the Royal Court Theatre Upstairs.

Sharman also helped make O'Brien's draft of a gothic-themed, schlock-horror comic-book fantasy romp into a reality. Sharman suggested changing the working title from They Came from Denton High, and The Rocky Horror Show opened at the Theatre Upstairs in June 1973. Within weeks it had become a box-office hit, moving from the Royal Court to the Classic Cinema, a cinema up for demolition on the King's Road, then to the King's Road Theatre (formerly a cinema known as the Essoldo) and eventually into the West End at the Comedy Theatre.

After seeing the second night's performance of The Rocky Horror Show in the Theatre Upstairs, Jonathan King produced the original cast soundtrack in just over 48 hours during an off-stage weekend, and rushed it out on his UK Records label. He also became a 20% backer with producer Michael White, who put up the remaining 80%.

During this period, O'Brien and his wife Kimi Wong recorded and released pop singles under the name Kimi and Ritz.

=== Later career ===
O'Brien continued writing musicals with arranger Richard Hartley, including: T. Zee (1976), Disaster (1978), The Stripper (1982 – based on the Carter Brown novel and produced in Australia), and Top People (1984). O'Brien and Hartley also provided three songs for the film The Return of Captain Invincible (1983), starring Alan Arkin. O'Brien wrote his one-man revue Disgracefully Yours (1985) singing as Mephistopheles Smith.

O'Brien has appeared in Jubilee (1977), Flash Gordon (1980),The Wolves of Willoughby Chase (1989), Dark City (1998), Ever After (1998) and Dungeons & Dragons (2000), among others. Additionally he guest starred in five episodes in the third series of the HTV dramatisation of Robin of Sherwood, as the corrupt druid Gulnar. A music CD of the songs from Disgracefully Yours entitled Absolute O'Brien was released in 1998.

O'Brien became the presenter of UK Channel 4's game show The Crystal Maze in 1990, specialising in sardonic put-downs, occasional eccentricities and playing his harmonica at random intervals. The show ran from 1990 to 1995, with O'Brien presenting the first four series. It was regularly Channel 4's highest-rated programme, reaching a peak of 7 million viewers for the 1993 Christmas special. O'Brien left The Crystal Maze in 1993 after the fourth series; the show was then taken over by Edward Tudor-Pole.

In other roles, O'Brien has conceptualised and played the role of the Child Catcher in the West End theatre production of Chitty Chitty Bang Bang. He also occasionally performs cabaret-style music and comedy on stages around the world, singing songs from Rocky Horror among others. In 1995, he performed a select number of shows as the devilish charmer Mephistopheles Smith in a musical/comedy show he wrote entitled Disgracefully Yours, to which he later gave permission to be adapted into a musical, first by Eubank Productions for the Kansas City Fringe Fest in 2006, and more recently by Janus Theatre Company for the Edinburgh Fringe 2007, simply entitled Mephistopheles Smith. In late 2005, he appeared (as the spirit of the mirror) in the pantomime version of Snow White, which played at the Milton Keynes Theatre. In the summer of 2006, he played the Child Catcher in the Queen's 80th birthday celebrations at Buckingham Palace.

O'Brien performed in Thank-You for the Music, a 90-minute ABBA documentary for ITV, directed by Martin Koch, who previously directed the musical Mamma Mia! The documentary included a remake of the mini musical '"The Girl with the Golden Hair" which ABBA performed during their 1977 world tour and featured on ABBA: The Album (also 1977). The musical was performed at the Prince of Wales Theatre and featured O'Brien, Liz McClarnon and the Dynamos. He also hosted the 1993 Brit Awards.

A patron of the Five Stars Scanner Appeal, which benefits the Royal Manchester Children's Hospital. From 2001 to 2006 he hosted the annual Transfandango, gala gathering of Dearhearts and Trans 'n' Gentle People to raise money for the hospital. This has since been superseded by Richard O'Brien's Halloween Party.

A script for another rumoured sequel entitled Revenge of the Old Queen of Rocky Horror, has been circulated on the web and reproduced on various fan sites, although it has been officially denied as O'Brien's work by his representatives. While he has worked on a screenplay by that title, it was never publicly released. He wrote the lyrics for The Stripper (based on the book by Carter Brown), a musical which had its British premiere at the Queen's Theatre, Hornchurch (London) on 28 August 2009.

In 2004, members of the Hamilton City Council in New Zealand honoured O'Brien's contribution to the arts with a statue of Riff Raff, the character he played in The Rocky Horror Show, on the site of the former Embassy Cinema.

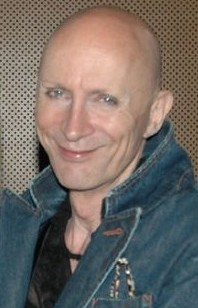
O'Brien in 2006

In September 2007, he reprised his role as the Child Catcher for the final two weeks of the five year British run of Chitty Chitty Bang Bang. He then played the role in its Singapore engagement for the month of November, extended to 9 December. Also in December, he visited Hamilton, New Zealand, for An Evening With Richard O'Brien, with presenter Mark Sainsbury and director Fiona Jackson.

In December 2008, O'Brien donated his original script Pig in Boots to the Wireless Theatre Company, who converted it into an audio pantomime. The show was recorded live at the Headliners Comedy Club in front of a studio audience with live FX and music. The production was opened by an original interview with O'Brien. In October 2012, O'Brien judged "Stage Fright" with the Wireless Theatre Company as part of the London Horror Festival and performed an acoustic set of Rocky Horror songs.

In March 2012, he gave a performance of song and autobiographical stories, It's Party Time with Richard O'Brien at the Hamilton Founders Theatre to celebrate his 70th birthday. In June 2012, he returned to Hamilton, New Zealand, to appear on stage as Fagin with the Hamilton Operatic Society's production of Oliver! at the Founders Theatre.

O'Brien appeared in 2015 in The Rocky Horror Show in the West End in a limited 11-performance run.

In September 2016 O'Brien opened the second stage Embassy Park in Hamilton together with Mayor Julie Hardaker. In October 2016, he appeared as the Crystal Maze Computer in a one-off Celebrity Crystal Maze episode for the charity 'Stand Up To Cancer' on Channel 4.

== Personal life ==
In a 2009 interview, O'Brien spoke about an ongoing struggle to reconcile cultural gender roles and described himself as transgender or "of a third gender" as Anton Rodgers once told him. O'Brien stated, "There is a continuum between male and female. Some are hard-wired one way or another, I'm in between". He expounded on this in a 2013 interview where he talked about using oestrogen for the previous decade, and that he views himself as 70% male and 30% female.

In 2017, O'Brien caused controversy when he said that he supported the statements of Germaine Greer and Barry Humphries that transgender women are not real women. He offered his sympathy to the trans community. In a 2020 interview with The Guardian, O'Brien was reported as stating: "I think anybody who decides to take the huge step with a sex change deserves encouragement and a thumbs-up. As long as they're happy and fulfilled, I applaud them to my very last day. But you can't ever become a natural woman". In a 2023 interview, O'Brien stated "We all know that nobody asks to be born straight or gay. We seem to be going backwards slightly, don't we, on this whole issue. I thought we'd have got over that. I thought we all understood now that people are born gay and people are born transgender. It's not a choice. I thought we'd all agreed on that. But lately, we're becoming confused by the whole subject once again. I prefer a more tolerant society".

In June 2010, the media reported that O'Brien had been denied New Zealand citizenship owing to his being too old under the country's immigration criteria. He commented, "They build a statue of me and celebrate me as a New Zealander, but I have to go on my knees and do all sorts of things, and I'm probably too old." O'Brien's application appeared to garner public support and the decision was later overturned on appeal. In August 2010, New Zealand's Dominion Post reported that O'Brien would be allowed residency and possibly citizenship as an "exceptional" case. According to the Waikato Times, he was officially registered as a New Zealand citizen on 14 December 2011.

On 16 August 2010, he appeared on an episode of Celebrity Cash in the Attic, where he donated the takings from his sale of memorabilia to the Royal Manchester Children's Hospital, Manchester.

O'Brien has been married three times and has three children. He and actress Kimi Wong were married on 4 December 1971 and had a son in 1972. He has a son and daughter from his second marriage to designer Jane Moss.

On 7 July 2012, aged 70, he proposed to Sabrina Graf, aged 35, a native of Germany, whom he had been dating for three years. They married on 6 April 2013 at their home in Katikati, Bay of Plenty.

== Filmography ==
=== Film ===
| Year | Title | Role | Notes |
|---|---|---|---|
| 1965 | Carry On Cowboy | Stunt Performer | |
| 1966 | The Fighting Prince of Donegal | Stunt Performer | |
| 1967 | Casino Royale | Stunt Performer | |
| 1971 | Zee and Co. | Party guest | |
| 1972 | Four Dimensions of Greta | Degenerate | |
| 1975 | The Rocky Horror Picture Show | Riff Raff | Also co-writer and composer |
| 1977 | Jubilee | John Dee | |
| 1977 | The Contraption | The Man | Short film |
| 1978 | The Odd Job | Batch | |
| 1980 | Flash Gordon | Fico | |
| 1981 | Shock Treatment | Dr. Cosmo McKinley | Also co-writer and composer |
| 1981 | The Rocky Horror Treatment | Himself | Documentary |
| 1983 | Digital Dreams | Partige the Surrey Servant | Also writer |
| 1985 | Revolution | Lord Hampton | |
| 1989 | The Wolves of Willoughby Chase | James | |
| 1997 | Spice World | Damien | |
| 1998 | Ever After | Pierre Le Pieu | |
| 1998 | Dark City | Mr. Hand | |
| 2000 | Dungeons & Dragons | Xilus | |
| 2000 | The Mumbo Jumbo | Archie | |
| 2001 | Elvira's Haunted Hills | Lord Vladimere Hellsubus | |
| 2009 | Night Train | Mrs Froy | |
| 2009 | Tales of the Fourth Dimension | Time Master | |
| 2010 | Jackboots on Whitehall | Heinrich Himmler (voice) | |
| 2011 | Phineas and Ferb the Movie: Across the 2nd Dimension | Lawrence Fletcher / Lawrence 2 (voice) | |
| 2011 | The British Guide to Showing Off | Himself | Documentary |
| 2013 | Justin and the Knights of Valour | Innkeeper / Baker (voice) | |
| 2013 | The Last Impresario | Himself | Documentary |
| 2016 | Manor Hunt Ball | Uncle Felix | |
| 2017 | The Stolen | Mr. Russell | |
| 2020 | Phineas and Ferb the Movie: Candace Against the Universe | Lawrence Fletcher (voice) | |
| 2025 | Strange Journey: The Story of Rocky Horror | Himself | Documentary |

=== Television ===
| Year | Title | Role | Notes |
|---|---|---|---|
| 1975 | Caribe | General Desmond | 1 episode |
| 1977 | Playhouse | Dave Head | |
| 1977 | Premiere | Reporter | Also writer for 1 episode |
| 1979 | The Dick Francis Thriller: The Racing Game | Cowboy | 1 episode |
| 1980 | The Kids Who Knew Too Much | Commissioner Avery | Television film |
| 1985 | Robin of Sherwood | Gulnar | Recurring role |
| 1986 | Roland Rat: The Series | Himself | Special guest, episode 8 |
| 1989 | Rushton's Illustrated | Himself | 5 episodes |
| 1990–1993, 2016 | The Crystal Maze | Presenter | 55 episodes (host); 2 episodes (guest) |
| 1991 | Mystery Train | Presenter | |
| 1993 | Full Stretch | Himself | 2 episodes |
| 1994 | The Ink Thief | The Ink Thief | 1 series |
| 1995 | The Detectives | Dr. Phibes / Police Mortician | 2 episodes |
| 1995 | The Car's the Star | Silver Cloud Owner | 1 episode |
| 1998 | Murder Call | | Season 2, episodes 10-11: “Deadline (parts 1 & 2)” |
| 1999 | Behind the Music | Himself | Episode: "The Rocky Horror Picture Show" |
| 2006 | The Ten Commandments | Anander | 2 episodes |
| 2007 | Urban Gothic | Thin Man | 1 episode |
| 2007 | The Dame Edna Treatment | Himself | 1 episode |
| 2008–2015, 2025–present | Phineas and Ferb | Lawrence Fletcher (voice) | Recurring role |
| 2008 | Richard O'Brien's Dead Strange | Presenter | Documentary series |
| 2010 | Celebrity Cash in the Attic | Himself | For charity |
| 2011 | Mongrels | Zombie Dog (voice) | Series 2, episode 2 |
| 2015 | DNA Detectives | Presenter | 1 series |
| 2017 | The Barefoot Bandits | Varney (voice) | |
| 2018 | Enchantimals | Lawrence (voice) | Series 3, episode 1 |
| 2020 | Midnight Movie Macabre | Himself | 1 episode |

=== Video games ===
| Year | Title | Role |
|---|---|---|
| 1999 | Rocky Interactive Horror Show | The Game Devil |
| 2006 | Carry On Quizzing | Presenter |
| 2007 | Robin Hood's Quest | Sheriff of Nottingham |

== Theatre ==
| Year | Title | Role | Notes |
|---|---|---|---|
| 1969 | Gulliver's Travels | Various | Mermaid Theatre |
| 1970 | Hair | Woof Daschund | UK tour |
| 1972 | Jesus Christ Superstar | Apostle / Leper | West End |
| 1973 | The Unseen Hand | Willie | The Royal Court Theatre Upstairs |
| 1973 | The Rocky Horror Show | Riff Raff | Also writer and composer The Royal Court Theatre Upstairs |
| 1975 | The Rocky Horror Show | Riff Raff | Belasco Theatre, Broadway |
| 1975 | And They Used to Star In Movies | Mickey Mouse | Soho Theatre |
| 1975 | The Tooth of Crime | Crow | The Royal Court Theatre |
| 1976 | T. Zee and the Lost Race | Various | Also writer and composer The Royal Court Theatre Upstairs |
| 1986 | Little Shop of Horrors | Mushnick | Newcastle Playhouse |
| 1986 | The News | Killer | Windmill Theatre |
| 1996 | Disgracefully Yours | Mephistopheles Smith | Also writer Comedy Theatre London; The Bottom Line, New York City |
| 2004–2005, 2007 | Chitty Chitty Bang Bang | Child Catcher | West End |
| 2006 | Snow White | Mirror | Milton Keynes Theatre |
| 2006 | The Rocky Horror Tribute Show | Himself | The Royal Court Theatre Upstairs |
| 2006 | Dirty Dancing | Bobbie | West End |
| 2009 | The Stripper | Mr. Arkwright | Also writer and composer Queen's Theatre, Hornchurch |
| 2012 | Oliver! | Fagin | Hamilton Founders Theatre |
| 2012 | It's Party Time with Richard O'Brien | Himself | Hamilton Founders Theatre |
| 2015 | Rocky Horror Show Live | Narrator | West End |
| 2015 | Shock Treatment | — | Writer, producer and composer King's Head Theatre, London |

== Discography ==
=== Singles ===
- "Merry Christmas Baby" (Kimi and Ritz) (1973)
- "Eddie" (Richard O'Brien) (1973)
- "Merry Christmas Baby (DJ version)" (Kimi and Ritz) – Epic Records (1974)
- "I was in love with Danny (but the crowd was in love with Dean)" (Kimi and Ritz) (1974)
- "Pseud's Corner" (Richard O'Brien) (1975)
- "Liebesträume" (Franz Liszt/Richard O'Brien) (performed by Kimi and Ritz) (1975)
- "There's a Light" (Kimi and Ritz) (1975)

=== Albums ===
- Absolute O'brien (1999) (Oglio Records)

=== Soundtracks and cast recordings ===
- The Rocky Horror Show (Original London cast) (1973)
- The Rocky Horror Picture Show (1975)
- Shock Treatment (1981)

== Awards and nominations ==
=== Awards ===
- 1998: Berlin International Film Festival Award - Special Teddy (for The Rocky Horror Picture Show)
- 2000: Gaylactic Spectrum Award (for The Rocky Horror Picture Show)
- 2025: Scroll of Honour from the Variety Artists Club of New Zealand in recognition of his valued contribution to the entertainment industry

=== Nominations ===
- 1974: Grammy Award for Best Musical Theater Album (for The Rocky Horror Show)
- 1999: Fangoria Chainsaw Award - Best Supporting Actor (for Dark City)
- 2001: Tony Award for Best Revival of a Musical (for The Rocky Horror Show)
