= McNally (surname) =

Origin
- Language: Irish
- Region of origin: Ulster; Connacht, Ireland

Other names
- Variant forms: MacNally, McAnally, Nally

McNally is an Irish surname.

In Ulster, it originated in County Tyrone as the anglicized form of Mac Conallaidh 'son of Cú Allaidh', a Gaelic name of the Cenél nEógain meaning the 'wild hound', i.e. 'wolf'. Prevalent in Ulster counties Antrim, Armagh and Monaghan, Mac Con Allaidh is a branch of the “Northern Ó Néill” group of Ulster clans. They are separate from the Mayo name Mac an Fhailghigh (see below).

In Connacht, the surname (typically spelt as Nally) originated in County Mayo as anglicized from Mac an Fhailghigh, 'son of the poor man' (modern Irish: Mac an Fhailí). Of Norman origin, the name was a Gaelicized form of Le Poer meaning "poor man" – this actually refers to a deliberate, religious vow of poverty, rather than ordinary pauperism.

Notable people with the name include:

== A–J ==
- Adrian McNally, British songwriter, producer and composer
- Alan McNally, British microbiologist
- Andrew McNally (1836–1904), Irish-American publisher
- Andrew McNally III (1909–2001), American printer and publisher
- Andrew McNally (baseball) (born 1973), Australian baseball player
- Andy McNally (born 1982), English rugby league footballer
- Art McNally (1925–2023), American football official
- Bernard McNally (born 1963), Northern Irish footballer and manager
- Bernard McNally (rugby league), Wales international rugby league footballer
- Bob McNally, American government official
- Brendan McNally (1935–2011), Irish footballer
- Brian McNally, British-born restaurateur
- C. S. McNally, American architect
- Caty McNally (born 2001), American tennis player
- Charles McNally (1787–1864), Irish Roman Catholic Bishop
- Chloé McNally, Brazilian jiu-jitsu practitioner from the US
- Chris McNally (actor) (born 1988), Canadian actor
- Christopher McNally (born 1960), American politician
- Colin McNally (1899–1952), Australian politician
- Conor McNally, Métis documentary filmmaker
- Dave McNally (1942–2002), American baseball player
- David McNally (academic) (born 1953), Canadian political scientist
- David McNally (director) (born 1960), British-Canadian director
- David McNally (football executive), English football administrator
- Derek McNally (1934–2020), British astronomer
- Donna McNally (born 1972), Northern Irish lawn bowler
- Dustin McNally, American politician
- Ed McNally (born 1962), Scottish-born Canadian soccer player
- Edward McNally (1900–1968), American politician
- Elizabeth M. McNally, American human geneticist and cardiologist
- Errol McNally (1943–2017), Northern Irish footballer
- Eryl McNally (born 1942), British politician
- Frank McNally (American football) (1907–1993), American football player
- Frank McNally (politician) (born 1988), Scottish politician
- George E. McNally (1923–1988), American politician
- George Fred McNally (1878–1965), Canadian educator
- Grant McNally (born 1962), Canadian politician
- Gregg McNally (born 1991), Ireland international rugby league player
- Harry McNally (1936–2004), English football manager
- Isabelle McNally (born 1989), American actress
- James M. McNally (born 1934), American politician
- James McNally (musician), British musician
- James McNally (American football), American football player and coach
- Jim McNally (born 1943), American football coach
- Jim McNally (baseball) (1952-2013), American baseball umpire
- Jim McNally (sport shooter) (1931–2018), American sports shooter
- Joanne McNally (born 1983), Irish comedian and actress
- Jody McNally, American politician
- Joe McNally (Gaelic footballer) (born 1960), Dublin Gaelic footballer
- Joe McNally (photographer) (born 1952), American photographer
- John J. McNally (1854–1931), American playwright
- John J. McNally (businessman) (1928–2018), American businessman
- John McNally (boxer) (1932–2022), Irish boxer
- John McNally (musician) (born 1941), English guitarist
- John McNally (politician) (born 1951), Scottish politician
- John McNally (tennis) (born 1998), American Professional tennis player
- John McNally (sport shooter) (born 1956), American sports shooter
- John McNally IV (born 1969), American lawyer
- John Thomas McNally (1871–1952), Canadian Catholic prelate
- Joseph McNally (businessman) (1942–2012), British businessman and philanthropist
- Joseph McNally (brother) (1923–2002), Irish brother
- Josh McNally (born 1990), England international rugby union player

== K–Z ==
- Karen McNally (1940–2014), American seismologist
- Keith McNally (born 1951), British restaurateur
- Kevin McNally (born 1956), English actor and writer
- Lauren McNally, American politician
- Leonard McNally (1752–1820), Irish barrister, playwright, and spy
- Louise McNally (born 1965), American linguist
- Luke McNally (born 1999), Irish professional footballer
- Mark McNally (footballer) (born 1971), Scottish footballer
- Mark McNally (racing driver) (born 1981), Australian racing driver
- Mark McNally (cyclist) (born 1989), British cyclist
- Martin McNally, Irish sportsman
- Mary McNally (born 1955), American politician
- Michael Joseph McNally (1860–1916), United States Navy Medal of Honor recipient
- Michele McNally (1955–2022), American photojournalism editor
- Mike McNally (1893–1965), American baseball player
- Nicholas McNally (1931–2021), Zimbabwean judge
- Owen McNally (1906–1973), Scottish footballer
- Paddy McNally (1937–2026), British motorsport businessman
- Paul McNally (astronomer) (1890–1955), American astronomer
- Paul McNally (footballer) (born 1949), English footballer
- Phil McNally, British animator
- Randy McNally (born 1944), American politician
- Raymond T. McNally (1931–2002), American historian and writer
- Richard McNally (born 1954), American psychologist
- Sandra McNally (born 1972), Irish economist
- Seumas McNally (1979–2000), Canadian video game designer
- Shane McNally (1954–2023), Australian RL coach and former rugby league footballer
- Shannon McNally (born 1973), American singer and songwriter
- Shaun McNally (born 1957), American politician
- Sonia McNally (born 1973), British visual artist
- Stephen McNally (1911–1994), American actor
- Stephen McNally (musician) (born 1978), British musician
- Stephen McNally (footballer) (born 1984), Scottish footballer
- Steve McNally (doctor), English physician
- Steve McNally (cricketer) (born 1958), New Zealand cricketer
- T. M. McNally (born 1969), American writer
- Terrence E. McNally (born 1948), American actor
- Terrence McNally (1938–2020), American playwright
- Tom McNally, Baron McNally (born 1943), British politician
- Vince McNally (1902–1997), American football executive
- William Duncan McNally (1882–1961), American chemist
- William McNally (1894–1976), English recipient of the Victoria Cross
- Zena McNally (born 1979), English singer

== See also ==
- McNally (disambiguation)
- Arthur McNalty (disambiguation)
- McAnally
- Nally
