= McInally =

McInally or MacInally is a Scottish surname. Notable people with the surname include:

- Alan McInally (born 1963), Scottish footballer and pundit
- Charlie McInally (born 1939), Scottish footballer
- Damian McInally (born 1975), Australian rugby union player
- Jackie McInally (1936–2016), Scottish footballer
- Jim McInally (ice hockey) (1948–2021), Canadian ice hockey player
- Jim McInally (born 1964), Scottish footballer and manager
- John McInally (disambiguation), multiple people
- Pat McInally (born 1953), American football player
- Stuart McInally (born 1990), Scottish rugby union player
- Tommy McInally (1899–1955), Scottish footballer

== See also ==
- McAnally
- McNally (surname)
