= James McNally =

James McNally or Jim McNally may refer to:

- James McNally (American football), American football player and coach
- James McNally (musician), British musician, composer and producer of the band Afro Celt Sound System
- James M. McNally (born 1934), American lawyer and politician from Iowa
- Jim McNally (born 1943), American retired football coach
- Jim McNally (baseball) (died 2013), Major League Baseball umpire
- Jim McNally (sport shooter) (1931–2018), American
- Jim McNally, locker room attendant involved in the 2015 Deflategate controversy
- James Wilson (Irish nationalist) (1836–1921; born James McNally), Fenian who was transported as a convict to Western Australia
- Randy McNally (James Rand McNally III, born 1944), American politician
