= Balthazar (restaurant) =

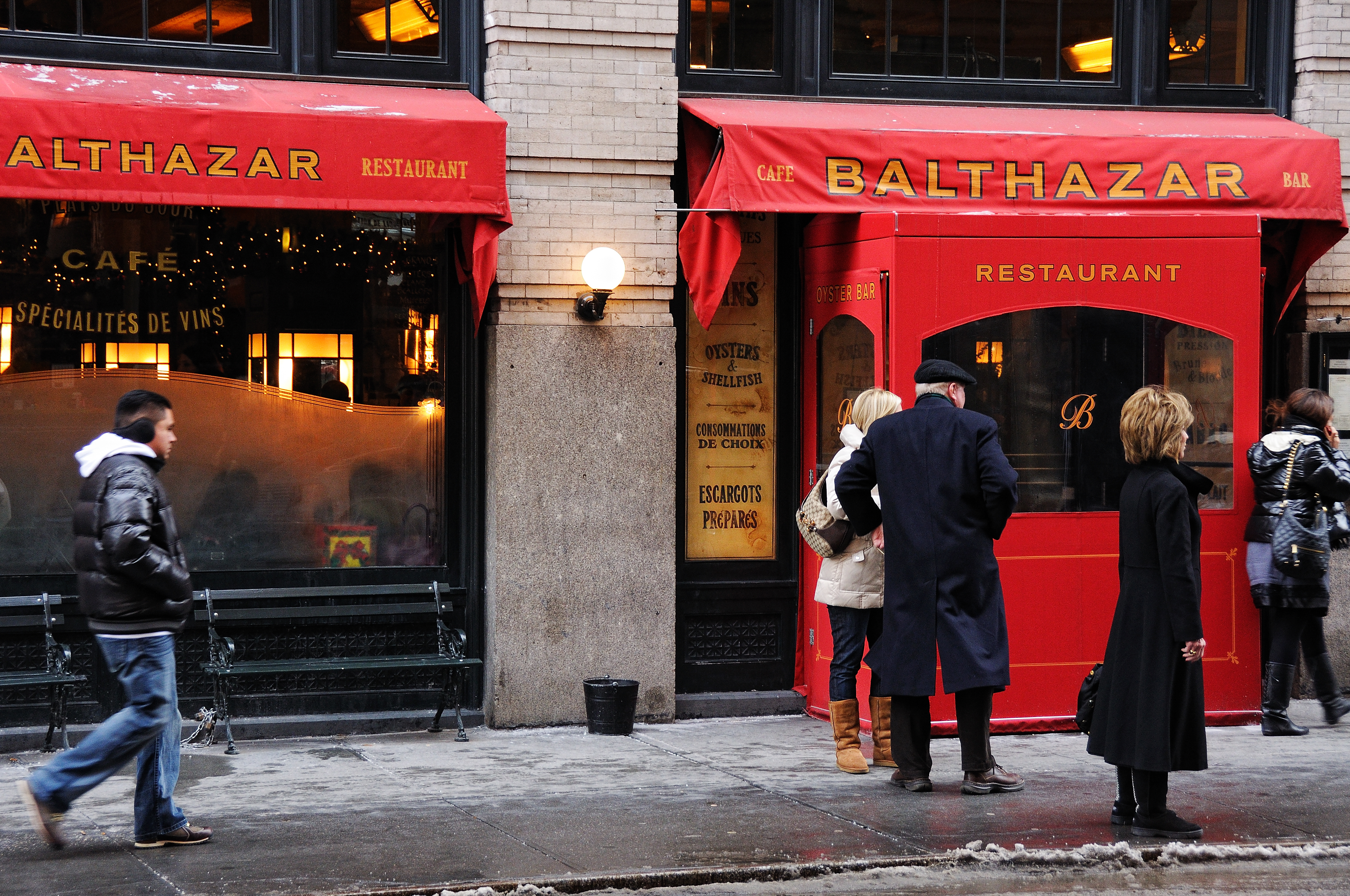
- Balthazar's SoHo location
- Interactive map of Balthazar

Restaurant information
- Established: April 21, 1997; 29 years ago
- Owner: Keith McNally
- Food type: French brasserie
- Dress code: Chic
- Location: 80 Spring Street (between Broadway and Crosby Street) in SoHo in Manhattan, New York, New York, New York, 10012, United States
- Coordinates: 40.722712°N 73.998159°W
- Reservations: Recommended
- Other locations: Balthazar Boulangerie; 8 Russell Street (corner of Wellington Street); Covent Garden; London WC2B 5HZ
- Website: Official website

Balthazar is a French brasserie restaurant located at 80 Spring Street (between Broadway and Crosby Street) in SoHo in Manhattan, in New York City. It opened on April 21, 1997, and is owned by British-born restaurateur Keith McNally.

McNally also created Nell's, Pastis (also now in Miami), Morandi, and Minetta Tavern (recently added to Washington, D.C.), as well as Lucky Strike, Pravda, and Schiller's Liquor Bar (all since closed) and The Odeon and Cafe Luxembourg (both owned by his ex-wife). Balthazar Bakery was later opened at 80 Spring Street. McNally opened Balthazar in the theatre district in Covent Garden in London, in February 2013.

== Description ==
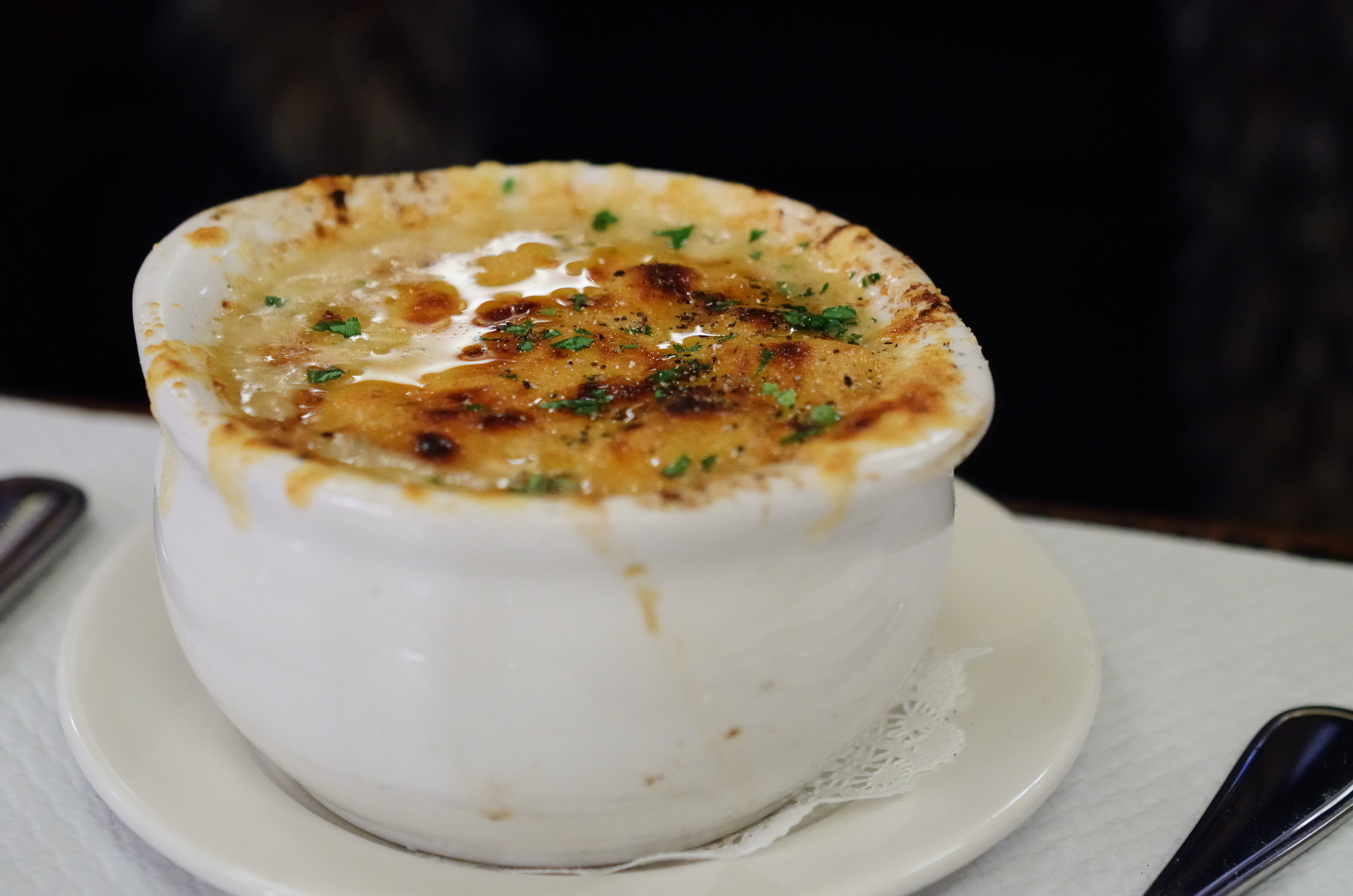
The French onion soup at Balthazar

Among its dishes are steak au poivre, steak frites, short ribs, beef stroganoff, duck confit, butternut squash, skate, and French onion soup. Balthazar typically serves around 1,500 guests a day, and its most popular dish is steak frites; the restaurant can sell 200 per day. Out of more than 200 employees, two full-time prep cooks are required just to handle potatoes for frying. It is also known for its raw bar. The head chef is Shane McBride, who was preceded by Lee Hanson and Riad Nasr.

The SoHo building that houses Balthazar used to be occupied by a tannery. Balthazar's design was intended to resemble that of a brasserie, with high-backed red leather banquettes, scarred and peeling brass oversize mirrors, high tin ceiling, scuffed tiled floor, faded saffron yellow walls, large windows, and antique lighting. The restaurant seats 180 people. Balthazar is also known for celebrity-watching; in 2012, Fodor's ranked it # 1 in New York City in that category.

In 2013, Zagat's gave Balthazar a food rating of 24 (out of 30), a decor rating of 24, and ranked it the second best French brasserie restaurant in New York City. That year, the New York Daily News rated its French onion soup the second-best in the city.

Balthazar made headlines in 2022 when comedian and actor James Corden was banned from the restaurant by owner Keith McNally, after reportedly being "abusive" and "extremely nasty" to staff. The ban was later rescinded after Corden apologised to McNally in private and in public, admitting that he had been "ungracious."

== In popular culture ==
Balthazar features in the 1998 Sex and the City episode “The Power of Female Sex” under the name of Balzac. Carrie Bradshaw and Samantha Jones have a difficult time getting a table at the exclusive restaurant, but they ultimately succeed after Carrie gives the hostess a tampon in the restaurant bathroom.

Balthazar features in the 1999 episode of Will and Grace "Will on Ice". Karen uses her high profile to secure a last minute table for four at the restaurant for Will's birthday.

Balthazar is featured in the 2009 autobiography Under the Table: Saucy Tales from Culinary School, by Katherine Darling (Simon & Schuster), in the 2010 novel The Associate, by John Grisham (Random House), in the 2010 novel Something Borrowed, by Emily Giffin (Macmillan), in the 2010 novel 36 Arguments for the Existence of God: A Work of Fiction, by Rebecca Goldstein (Random House), in the 2011 juvenile fiction novel Holiday Spirit, by Zoe Evans (Simon & Schuster), in the 2011 autobiography Innocent Spouse: A Memoir, by Carol Ross Joynt (Random House), and in the 2012 novel The Stolen Chalice, by Kitty Pilgrim (Simon & Schuster). In November 1999, comedian and actor Jerry Seinfeld proposed to Jessica Sklar at Balthazar.

In the 2026 novel Games: A Love Story by Anna Maria Volkova, main characters Lili and Aleksandr have two crucial encounters at Balthazar during breakfast hours.

== See also ==
- Jesse Dunford Wood, a chef at Balthazar
- List of French restaurants
