= Frenchette =

French restaurant in New York City

Coordinates: 40.719658°N 74.005752°W

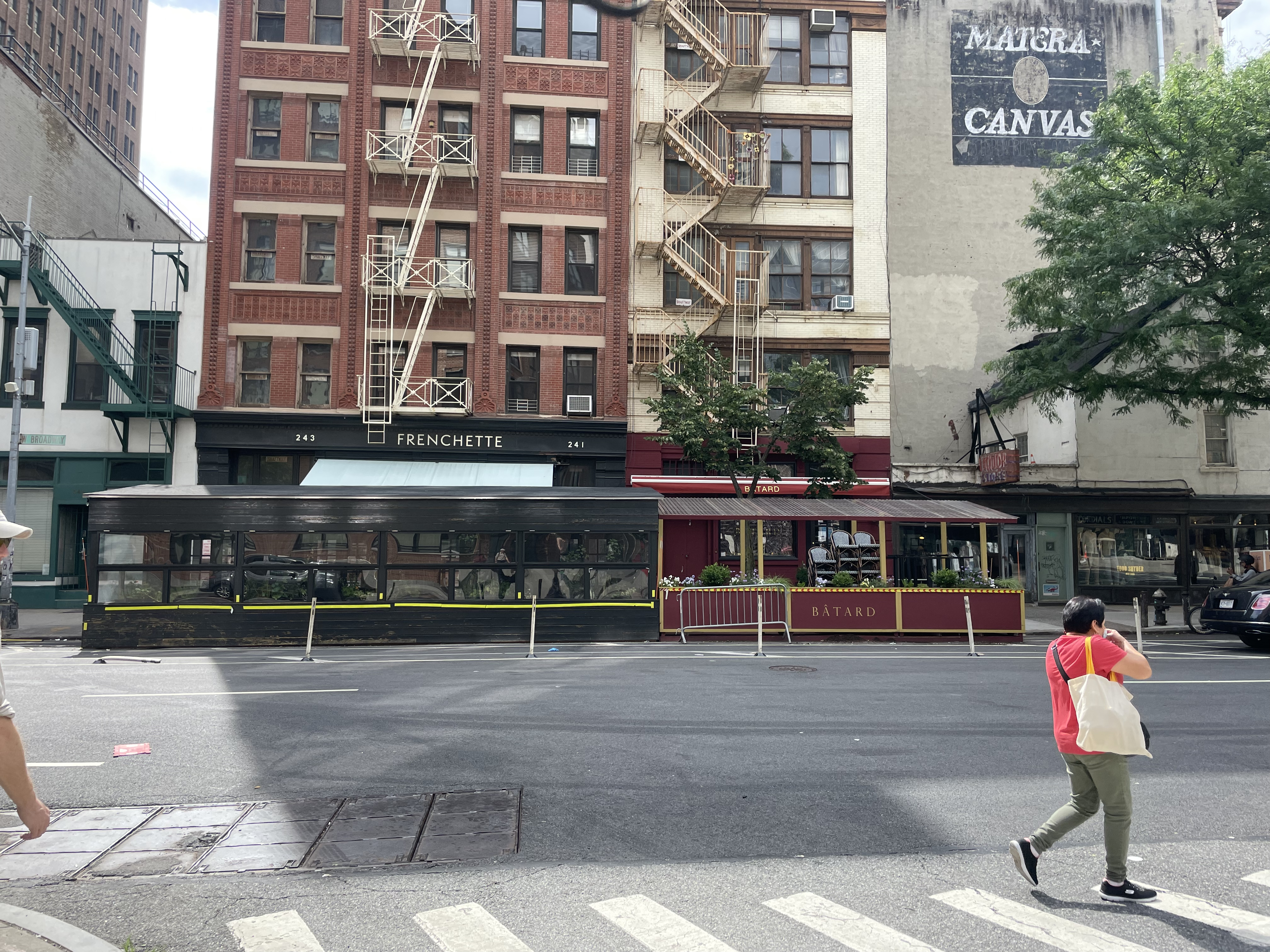
- Frenchette (left)
- Interactive map of Frenchette

Restaurant information
- Established: 2018
- Food type: French
- Location: 241 West Broadway, New York City, New York, 10013, United States
- Website: https://www.frenchettenyc.com/

Frenchette is a restaurant in Tribeca, Manhattan, New York City, which opened in April 2018. Situated in the Tribeca East Historic District, the restaurant won the James Beard Foundation Award as Best New Restaurant in 2019. It is owned by chefs Riad Nasr and Lee Hanson and is named for David Johansen's 1978 song "Frenchette". The menu includes a mix of modern and traditional French with dishes like escargots, tortilla espanola, and spaghetti with shaved bottarga.

Nasr and Hanson worked together since 1997 at Keith McNally's restaurants, Balthazar, Pastis, and Minetta Tavern, before opening Frenchette.

Pete Wells placed Frenchette in fifty-seventh place in his 2023 ranking of the hundred best restaurants in New York City.
