= Senator McNally =

Senator McNally may refer to:

- James M. McNally (born 1934), Iowa State Senate
- Randy McNally (born 1944), Tennessee State Senate
