= John McNally =

John McNally may refer to:

== Arts and entertainment ==
- John McNally (musician) (born 1941), singer and guitarist with the Searchers
- John J. McNally (c. 1854–1931), American playwright and theatre critic
- John McNally (Emmerdale), a fictional character on the British soap opera Emmerdale

== Politics ==
- John J. McNally (businessman) (1928–2018), American businessman and government official
- John McNally (politician) (born 1951), Scottish National Party politician, MP for Falkirk since 2015
- John McNally IV (born 1969), mayor of Youngstown, Ohio

== Sports ==
- Johnny Blood (John Victor McNally, 1903–1985), American football player and coach
- John McNally (boxer) (1932–2022), Irish Olympic boxer
- John McNally (sport shooter) (born 1956), American Olympic sport shooter
- John McNally (tennis) (born 1998), American tennis player
