= Golden calf (disambiguation) =

The golden calf is an idol in the Bible and the Qur'an.

Golden calf may also refer to:

== Books ==
- The Little Golden Calf, a 1931 Soviet novel by writers Ilf and Petrov

== Film and television ==
- Golden Calf (award), a Dutch film award
- The Golden Calf (1925 film), a 1925 German film
- The Golden Calf (1930 film), a 1930 American pre-Code comedy film
- The Golden Calf (1961 film), a 1961 Finnish comedy film
- The Golden Calf (1968 film), a 1968 black and white Soviet film based on the novel
- Mooby the Golden Calf, a fictional character in director Kevin Smith's film settings

== Other ==
- "The Golden Calf", a song on the Prefab Sprout album From Langley Park to Memphis
- A sculpture by British artist Damien Hirst
- Le veau d'or est toujours debout (The Golden Calf is still standing), an aria in Charles Gounod's opera Faust
- Le Veau d'Or restaurant
