= Indochine (restaurant) =

Restaurant in New York City

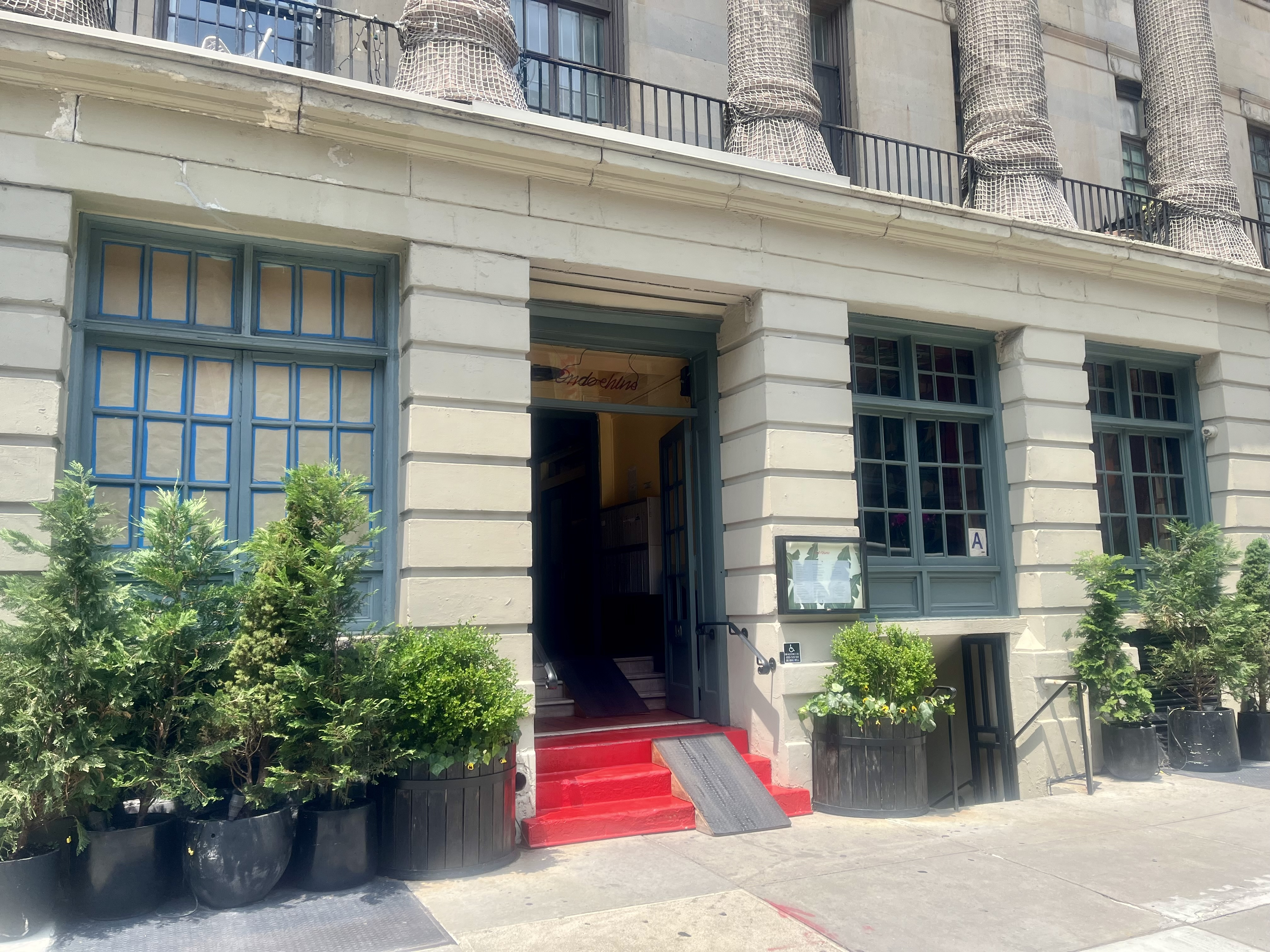
- The restaurant's exterior in 2025
- Interactive map of Indochine

Restaurant information
- Established: 1984
- Location: 430 Lafayette Street, New York, New York, New York, 10003
- Coordinates: 40.7292°N 73.9923°W
- Website: indochinenyc.com

Indochine is a French-Vietnamese restaurant founded in the 1980s in New York City by restaurateur Brian McNally (who had previously co-founded The Odeon with his brother Keith McNally) and music producer John Loeffler. Opened "among the auto body shops of gritty Lafayette Street" it sits in a historic row of buildings across from the Public Theater known as La Grange Terrace, which was, at times, the home of Vanderbilts, Astors, Julia Gardiner Tyler (wife of President Tyler), and Warren Delano Jr. (grandfather of FDR).

Opening in 1984 with a dinner honoring artist Julian Schnabel, Indochine quickly became a popular gathering place for members of what is referred to as the East Village art scene, which included Jean-Michel Basquiat, Kenny Scharf, and Andy Warhol.

In 1992, McNally sold the business to Jean-Marc Houmard — who had started at the restaurant as a waiter in 1986 — along with partners Michael Callahan and chef Huy Chi Le. The restaurant retained much of its original design, including the signature palm leaf motif and low lighting, as well as its unique menu, considered by many as an early example of the fusion cuisine trend in the United States.

Critical reception has varied over time. A 1984 review in The New York Times described it as offering "some invigorating food from Southeast Asia." In a follow-up piece, they remarked that the "still-trendy-after-all-these-years" restaurant served "vivid and authentic" spring rolls; another review by The Infatuation called the same signature rolls "entirely generic." However, in 2004 Times critic Frank Bruni remarked that "food was beside the point," calling Indochine "the epitome of cool" and the living idea of a restaurant as a "badge of knowingness and belonging."

In 2009, marking its 25th anniversary, Rizzoli published Indochine: Stories, Shaken and Stirred, a photo book featuring archival images of high-profile guests in the restaurant over the years, such as Madonna, Kate Moss, Grace Jones, Marc Jacobs, Bruce Weber, and Valentino with many of the photos taken by Patrick McMullan, Roxanne Lowit, and Patrick Demarchelier, published alongside stories by writers such as Salman Rushdie, Anthony Haden-Guest, and Moby, and artworks by Francesco Clemente, Helmut Lang, Ruben Toledo, Tom Sachs, and more.

Around this time, Vogue editor-in-chief Anna Wintour described Indochine as "virtually unique in New York – and pretty much everywhere else, for that matter."
