= Vincent Burke =

Vincent Burke may refer to:

- Vincent P. Burke (1878–1953), Canadian politician
- Vincent S. Burke (1920–2001), American politician
- Vincent Burke (producer) (1952–2022), New Zealand film and television producer
