= Nell Campbell =

Australian actor and singer

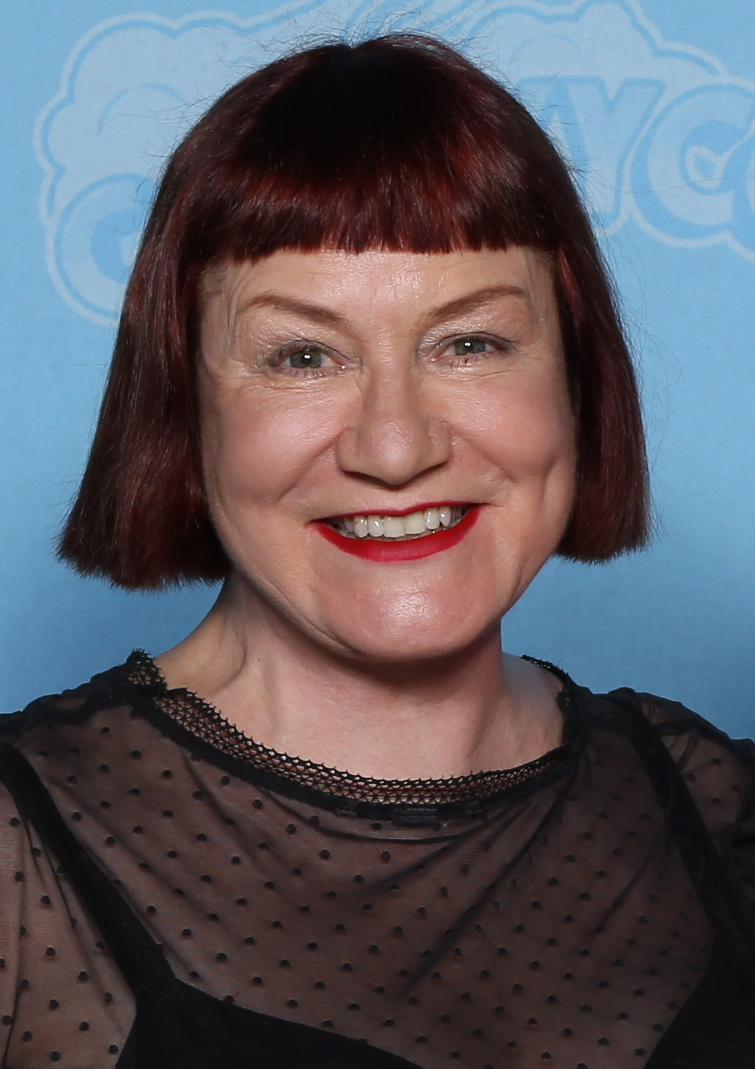
- Campbell at GalaxyCon Raleigh in 2019
- Born: Laura Elizabeth Campbell; 24 May 1953 (age 73); Sydney, New South Wales, Australia
- Other name: Little Nell
- Occupations: Actress; singer; club owner
- Years active: 1973–present
- Organisation: Nell's (1986–2004)
- Children: 1
- Relatives: Cressida Campbell (sister)
- Musical career
- Genres: Pop; disco
- Instrument: Vocals
- Labels: A&M; Festival

Laura Elizabeth Campbell (born 24 May 1953), better known as Nell Campbell or by her stage name Little Nell, is an Australian actress, singer and former club owner. She played the role of Columbia in both the 1975 film The Rocky Horror Picture Show and the original stage play from which it was adapted.

Campbell released her EP, The Musical World of Little Nell (Aquatic Teenage Sex & Squalor), through A&M Records in 1978. She appeared as Nurse Ansalong in the 1981 film Shock Treatment, the sequel of Rocky Horror Picture Show. In 1984, she appeared as Beth in the drama film The Killing Fields. Campbell owned the nightclub Nell's from 1986 to 2004.

== Early life ==
Campbell was born in Sydney, to Ruth and Ross Campbell. Ross, a writer, referred to her as "Little Nell" (after a character in Charles Dickens' The Old Curiosity Shop) in his family life column in the Sydney Daily Telegraph. She grew up with three siblings: Sally, Patrick and Cressida. Her elder sister Sally was a property master, a set designer and (subsequently) a fashion designer; her younger sister Cressida Campbell is an artist; her elder brother Patrick (who died in 2020) was a solar engineer at the University of New South Wales. Nell began dancing when she was 10, in order to remain healthy following being diagnosed with hepatitis A. She was called Laura E. Campbell until the age of about 17, when she went by the nickname "Sonny" (pronounced to rhyme with "Donny"), short for "Sonata". She attended high school at Abbotsleigh School for Girls in Sydney, supporting herself as a waitress.

== Career ==
Campbell decided to use the name "Little Nell" as a stage name after her arrival in Britain in the early 1970s with her family. She sold clothes at Kensington Market; her stall was next to Freddie Mercury's. She also worked as a busker and as a soda jerk in a café, where her tap dancing is often noted as the reason why she was cast as Columbia in the original production of The Rocky Horror Show following an impromptu audition. She reprised the role in The Rocky Horror Picture Show, released in 1975, and starred as Nurse Ansalong in the 1981 sequel, Shock Treatment.

After The Rocky Horror Picture Show, Campbell signed a recording contract with A&M Records. Her debut single was "Stilettos and Lipstick" backed with "Do the Swim", released in 1975. She also recorded a disco version of the song "Fever" in 1978, which was again backed with "Do the Swim". The B-side of both of these releases became better known, perhaps helped by a performance on British television in which she accidentally (and repeatedly) exposed her breasts. While edited out of the original broadcast in 1975, the unedited version was shown worldwide on bloopers shows (beginning with the British show It'll Be Alright on the Night in 1977). Following this notoriety, another effort was made to promote the recordings made in 1975 and 1976. In 1978, a "triple B-side" extended play titled The Musical World of Little Nell (Aquatic Teenage Sex & Squalor) was released which featured both "Do the Swim" and "Stillettos and Lipstick" along with the track "Dance that Cocktail Latin Way" (also known as "Tropical Isle") which originally appeared as the B-side of her second single from 1976. Following some success with the EP, the other two tracks, singles "Fever" and "See You Round like a Record", were released as a single but that was to be her last release on A&M. A final single, "Beauty Queen" from the film The Alternative Miss World, was released on PRE Records in 1980.

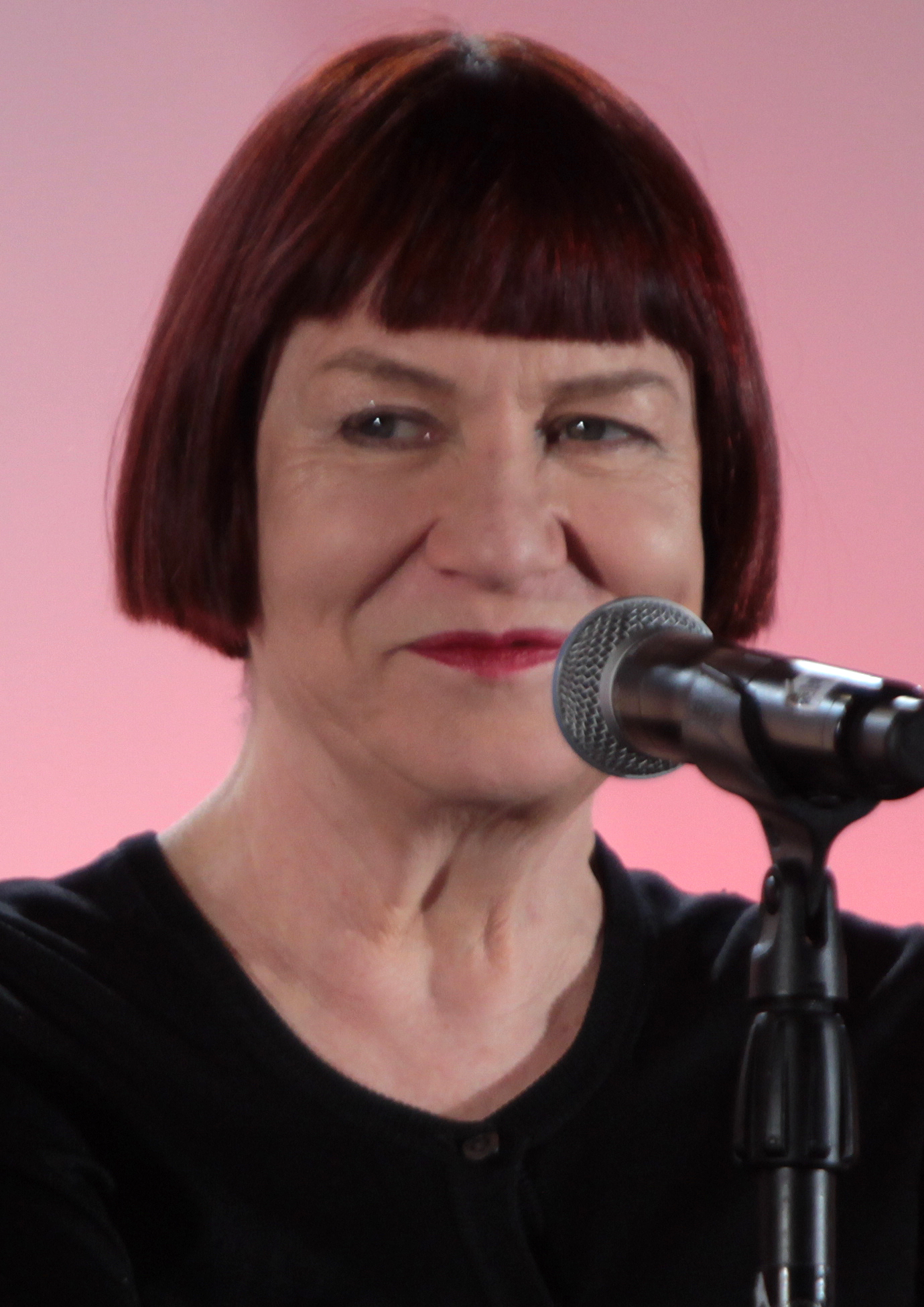
Campbell in 2015

Campbell has also appeared in several stage productions, including the Off-Broadway play You Should Be So Lucky and the Broadway musical Nine. She appeared as Sandra LeMon in the British TV series Rock Follies of '77.

In 1986, Campbell opened the nightclub Nell's on West 14th Street in Manhattan (New York) with Keith McNally and Lynn Wagenknecht. In 1995 she opened two restaurants in New York: The Kiosk (uptown) and E&O (downtown). Nell's was sold in 1998 to Noel Ashman and his business partner, actor Chris Noth, right before Campbell gave birth to her daughter, Matilda Violet, with ex-boyfriend and business partner, Eamon Roche. The club closed in 2004.

Campbell has written several magazine articles, including regular segments called "MamaTalks" and "FirstLook" in the now-defunct Talk magazine, starting in the December 1999 issue.

== Filmography ==
=== Film ===
| Year | Title | Role | Notes |
|---|---|---|---|
| 1974 | Barry McKenzie Holds His Own | Nerida Brealey | Feature film |
| 1974 | Ulla's Fete | Self | Short film |
| 1975 | The Rocky Horror Picture Show | Columbia | Feature film |
| 1975 | Lisztomania | Olga | Feature film |
| 1975 | Alfie Darling | Party Guest | Feature film |
| 1976 | Summer of Secrets | Kym | Feature film |
| 1977 | Jubilee | Crabs | Feature film |
| 1977 | Journey Among Women | Meg | Feature film |
| 1980 | The Alternative Miss World | Herself | Film documentary |
| 1981 | The Rocky Horror Treatment | Self (uncredited) | TV film |
| 1981 | Shock Treatment | Nurse Ansalong | Feature film (sequel to The Rocky Horror Picture Show) |
| 1982 | Pink Floyd – The Wall | Groupie | Live-action/animated feature film |
| 1983 | Dead on Time | Female Teller | Short film |
| 1983 | Stanley | Amy Benton | Feature film |
| 1984 | The Killing Fields | Beth | Feature film |
| 1985 | I Wanna Be a Beauty Queen | The Opening Act | |
| 1998 | Great Expectations | Erica Thrall | Feature film |
| 2000 | Joe Gould's Secret | Tamara | Feature film |
| 2000 | The Intern | The Host | Feature film |
| 2013 | The Last Impresario | Herself | Documentary film |
| 2019 | Palm Beach | Unimpressed Grandmother | Feature film |
| 2021 | Seriously Red | Doc Nell | Feature film |

=== Television ===
| Year | Title | Role | Notes |
|---|---|---|---|
| 1971 | GTK | | TV series, 1 episode |
| 1975 | The London Weekend Show | Performer | 2 episodes |
| 1977 | Rock Follies of '77 | Sandra LeMon | 6 episodes |
| 1977 | It'll Be Alright on the Night | Herself | |
| 1979 | Hazell | Pamela | Episode: "Hazell and the Happy Couple" |
| 1979 | Shoestring | Joanna Lomas | Episode: "Nine Tenths of the Law" |
| 1980 | Armchair Thriller | Zoe Summers | Serial: "Dead Man's Kilt" |
| 1981 | Funny Man | Fiona | Episode: "Letting Go" |
| 1981 | Countdown | Performer (singing "Beauty Queen") | 1 episode |
| 1983 | Bergerac | Mrs. Moberley | Episode: "Prime Target" |
| 1987 | Saturday Night Live | Performer | Episode: "Garry Shandling/Los Lobos" |
| 2010 | Rake | Flick Moyers | Episode: "R vs. Lorton" |

=== Television (as self) ===
| Year | Title | Role | Notes |
|---|---|---|---|
| 1980 | TV's Bloopers & Practical Jokes | Self | TV series US, 1 episode |
| 1987 | Saturday Night Live | Self – Guest | TV series US, 1 episode |
| 1989 | After Dark | Self – Guest | TV series UK, 1 episode |
| 1990 | The Big Picture | Self (as Little Nell) | TV series UK, 1 episode |
| 1990 | The Word | Self – Guest | TV series UK, 1 episode |
| 1990 | Juke Box Jury | Self – Panelist (as Little Nell) | TV series UK, 1 episode |
| 1995 | Rocky Horror Double Feature Video Show | Self | Video US |
| 2000 | VH-1 Where Are They Now? | Self | TV series US, 1 episode |
| 2000 | Rocky Horror 25: Anniversary Special | Self | TV Special US |
| 2001 | Backstory | Self | TV series US, 1 episode |
| 2001 | Tracey Ullman's Visible Panty Lines | Self | TV series UK, 2 episodes |
| 2008 | Spicks and Specks | Self | TV series Aus, 2 episodes |
| 2015; 2022 | Studio 10 | Self with Patricia Quinn | TV series, 1 episode |
| 2016; 2022 | Today Extra | Self – Guest | TV series Aus, 1 episode |
| 2018 | Horror Kung-Fu Theatre | Self | TV series US, 1 episode |
| 2019 | Time Warp: The Greatest Cult Films of All-Time | Self | TV miniseries US |
| 2020 | Midnight Movie Macabre | Self | TV series US |
| 2021 | Rocky Horror 45: The Movie | Self | Film documentary UK |
| 2022 | The Chronicles of Podcast | Self | TV series UK, 1 episode |
| 2022 | Today Extra | Self – Guest | TV series Aus, 1 episode |
| 2022 | Studio 10 | Self – Guest | TV series Aus, 1 episode |
| 2023 | The Morning Show | Self – Guest | TV series Aus, 1 episode |
| 2023 | Weekend Sunrise | Self | TV series Aus, 1 episode |
| 2023 | Studio 10 | Self – Guest | TV series Aus, 1 episode |

== Theatre ==
| Year | Title | Role | Notes |
|---|---|---|---|
| 1973 | The Rocky Horror Show | Columbia | The Royal Court Theatre Upstairs |
| 1975 | And They Used to Star in Movies | Minnie Mouse | Soho Theatre |
| 1977 | A Streetcar Named Desire | Stella | Oxford Playhouse |
| 1977 | Censored Scenes From King Kong | Iris Fantoccini | Open Space Theatre |
| 1978 | Stoop | Herself | Soho Theatre |
| 1985 | Women Behind Bars | Host | Footbridge Theatre at Sydney University |
| 1994 | You Should Be So Lucky | Polly | Off-Broadway |
| 2003 | Nine | Lina Darling | On Broadway at Eugene O'Neill Theatre |
| 2006 | The Rocky Horror Tribute Show | Herself | The Royal Court Theatre Upstairs |
| 2022–2023 | All's Nell That Ends Nell | Herself | One-woman show |
| 2023 | The Rocky Horror Show 50th Anniversary | Narrator | London |

== Discography ==
Singles / EPs

- "Stillettos and Lipstick" / "Do the Swim" (A&M, 1975)
- "See You Round like a Record" / "Dance that Cocktail Latin Way" (A&M, 1976)
- "Fever" / "Do the Swim" (A&M, 1976)
- The Musical World of Little Nell (Aquatic Teenage Sex & Squalor) (A&M, 1978)
- "Fever" / "See You Round like a Record" (reissue) (A&M, 1978)
- "Beauty Queen" (Pre Records, 1980)

Guest vocals

- Tuff Little Surfer Boy (featured as "Roxanne" for the song by Truth & Beauty) (1974)

Soundtracks and Cast Recordings

- The Rocky Horror Show (Original London Cast) (1973)
- The Rocky Horror Picture Show (1975)
- Shock Treatment (1981)
