= Le Veau d'Or =

Restaurant in New York City

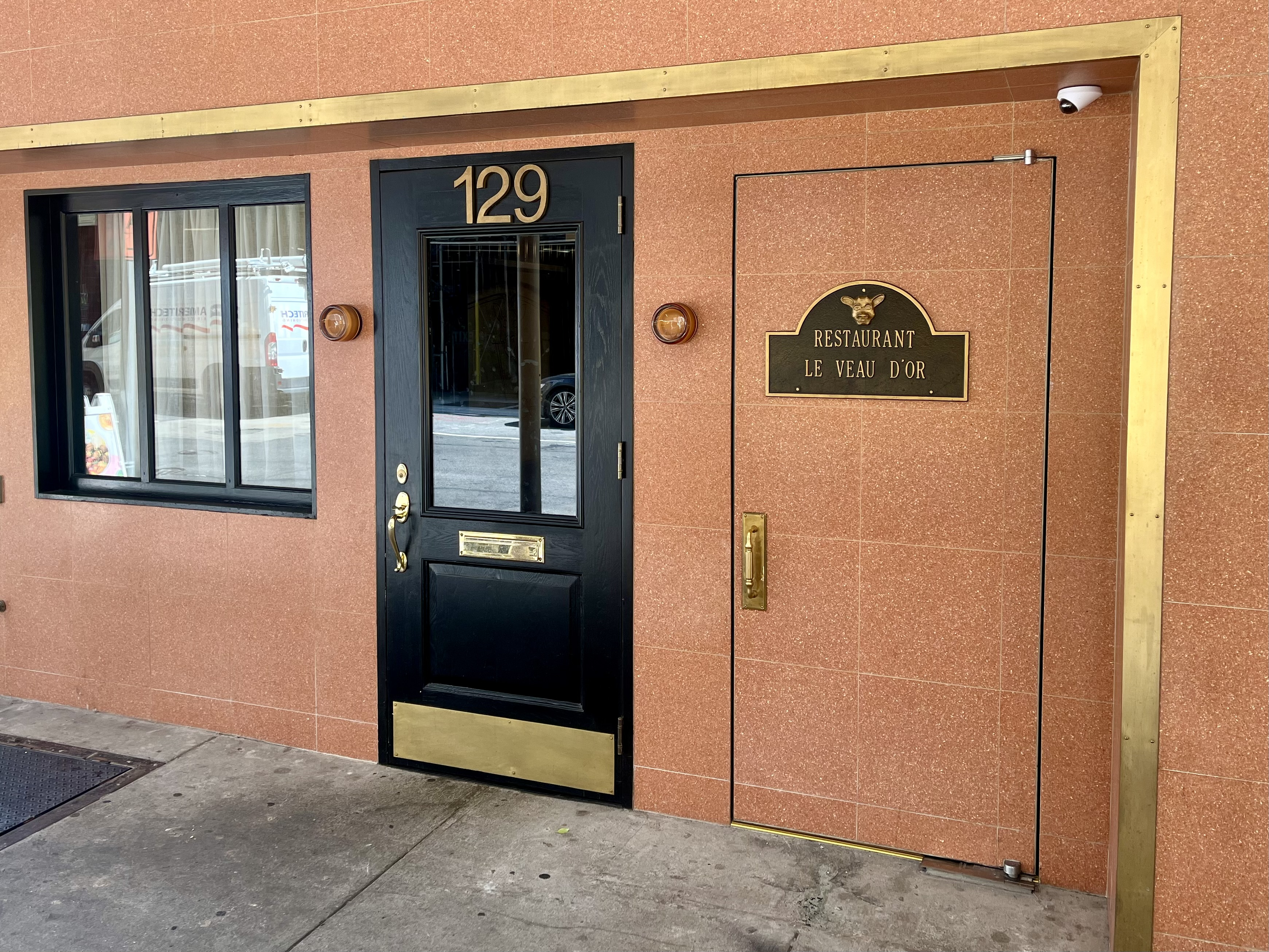
- The restaurant's exterior in 2024
- Interactive map of Le Veau d'Or

Restaurant information
- Established: 1937
- Owners: Riad Nasr; Lee Hanson
- Food type: French
- Location: 129 East 60th Street, New York, New York, 10022, United States
- Coordinates: 40°45′47.4″N 73°58′5.3″W

Le Veau d'Or is a restaurant on the Upper East Side of Manhattan, serving traditional French cuisine since 1937. It is the oldest French bistro in New York City.

Since 2019, Riad Nasr and Lee Hanson (of the restaurant Frenchette) have been the owners, having bought Le Veau d'Or from Catherine Treboux, the daughter of the longtime owner, Robert Treboux, who bought the restaurant in 1985 and died in 2012.

== History ==
The restaurant opened at a time when many French chefs and restaurateurs were traveling to New York to work at the French Pavilion at the 1939 New York World's Fair in Flushing, Queens, generating new local excitement around French cuisine.

Le Veau d'Or was created by Henri Guiguet in 1937, joined by Georges Baratin in 1945. Georges Baratin’s family owned Les Pleiades in Barbizon, France. Lucien Guillemaud, who had worked with Alexandre Dumaine of la Côte d'Or in Saulieu, France, joined as chef for 17 years. Lucien Verge joined the staff in 1956 upon his arrival in New York from Paris.

At the height of le Veau d'Or's mid-century popularity, customers included Marlene Dietrich, Ernest Hemingway, Oleg Cassini, Grace Kelly and Orson Welles.

In 1968, Craig Claiborne of The New York Times gave the restaurant a four-star review. He called it the one restaurant he couldn’t live without.

Georges Baratin and Lucien Guillemaud retired in 1970, passing the restaurant to Gerard Rocheteau, whose family owned Au Grand Comptoir in Les Halles, Paris. The chef was Roland Chenus from Henri Soulé’s Le Pavillon and La Côte Basque, followed by Gerard Vidal from Lutèce.

The first American to work with Roland Chenus was Sandy D'Amato, who went on to open Sanford Restaurant in Milwaukee and became a James Beard-awarded chef. The other American to have worked in the kitchen was Daniel Leader of Bread Alone.

Gerard Rocheteau retired in 1985 when Robert Treboux bought the restaurant. Robert Treboux had previously created Le Manoir, Le Clos Normand, and La Rotisserie.

In April 2006, "Vive le Restaurant", James Villas's tribute to le Veau d'Or and other old-school French restaurants was published in Saveur Magazine, edited by James Oseland. The essay was later anthologized in Best Food Writing 2006.

On Anthony Bourdain: No Reservations, Bourdain visited the restaurant, where he was impressed with the breadth of the traditional menu. The episode, titled "Disappearing Manhattan", ran on February 23, 2009.

In 2011, Le Veau d'Or received the America's Classic Award from the James Beard Foundation. In the feature video created by the James Beard Foundation, food writer Barbara Kafka said "for 50 years I've been coming here...please may it still survive."

The Frenchette team took over in 2019, planning to reopen later that year, after renovations. Due to the COVID-19 pandemic, the restaurant remained closed for nearly five years and ultimately reopened July 2024. The reopened restaurant includes a new upstairs private dining space.

== Honors and awards ==
- 2011 The restaurant received the America's Classics Award from the James Beard Foundation
- 2025 James Beard Foundation Award for Outstanding Restaurateur went to co-owners Riad Nasr and Lee Hanson
- 2025 The World’s 50 Best Restaurants named le Veau d'Or No. 10
- 2026 The World’s 50 Best Restaurants named le Veau d'Or No. 12

== Books mentioning le Veau d'Or ==
In keeping with le Veau d'Or's long history as a literary hotspot, the restaurant has received numerous mentions in biographies, memoirs, and novels, and has been referenced in many books on food and culinary history.

=== Biography and memoir ===
- Papa Hemingway by A. E. Hotchner (1966)
- The House by the Sea by May Sarton (1977)
- King of the Confessors by Thomas Hoving (1981)
- In My Own Fashion: An Autobiography by Oleg Cassini (1987)
- Between Bites: Memoirs of a Hungry Hedonist by James Villas (2002)
- Dishing: Great Dish - and Dishes - from America's Most Beloved Gossip Columnist by Liz Smith (2005)
- Rogue’s Gallery: The Secret History of the Moguls and the Money That Made the Metropolitan Museum by Michael Gross (2009)
- Dearie: The Remarkable Life of Julia Child by Bob Spitz (2012)
- Good Stock: Life on a Low Simmer by Sanford D'Amato (2013)

=== Fiction ===
- Hold the Dream by Barbara Taylor Bradford (1985)
- Fine Things by Danielle Steele (1987)
- After the Fall: An Illustrated Novel by Victoria Roberts (2012)
- The Goldfinch by Donna Tartt (2013)
- Fixers: a novel by Michael M. Thomas (2016)
- The Glass Hotel by Emily St. John Mandel (2020)

=== Food history, cookbooks and restaurant guides ===
- Knife and Fork in New York: Where to Eat, What to Order by Lawton Mackall (1949)
- Great Restaurants of America by Ted Patrick & Silas Spitzer (1960)
- Bottoms Up by Ted Saucier (1962)
- Hart's Guide to New York City by Harold H. Hart (1964)
- George the Housewife by George Leonard Herter (1964)
- The New York Times Guide to Dining Out in New York by Craig Claiborne (1968)
- The Restaurants of New York, 1987 Edition by Seymour Britchky (1986)
- Great Chefs of Chicago (Chapter on Lucien Verge) by Ellen Brown (1992)
- Best Food Writing 2006 (essay "Vive le Restaurant" by James Villas) edited by Holly Hughes (2006)
- The United States of Arugula by David Kamp (2006)
- Appetite City: A Culinary History of New York by William Grimes (2009)
- The Man Who Changed the Way We Eat: Craig Claiborne and the American Food Renaissance by Thomas McNamee (2012)
- James Beard's All-American Eats: Recipes and Stories from our Best-Loved Local Restaurants edited by Anya Hoffman (2016)
- Ten Restaurants That Changed America by Paul Freedman (2016)
