= Robert Treboux =

French-American chef and restauranteur

- Born: Robert Marcel Tréboux; October 21, 1924; Vinzier, France
- Died: August 22, 2012 (aged 87); New York City, US
- Occupations: Chef and restaurateur
- Children: Catherine Treboux

Robert Marcel Tréboux (October 21, 1924 Vinzier - August 22, 2012), was a French chef working in New York City at Le Pavillon. From 1985 to his death in 2012, he owned the restaurant Le Veau d'Or, which was profiled in a 2009 episode of Anthony Bourdain: No Reservations. With his death, Time declared the era of la cuisine classique to be over.

== Career ==
Tréboux was sixteen when he went to work as a waiter at his cousin's hotel in Paris before going to work at Lasserre, also in Paris.He then worked at Claridge's in Paris and London as well as The Palace in Madrid. At some point, he was promoted to captain. On board the French liner Le Liberté, Treboux met a New York judge who sponsored him to come to the United States where he worked at Le Pavillon for five years. When he went to work at Maud Chez Elle, he was a Maitre d’.

He opened Le Manoir, December 1962.He also opened Le Clos Normand (1965 ) and La Rotisserie Française (1973), which was one of the first restaurants with an open kitchen.

Chef Alain Sailhac’s first Chef position in New York was with Robert Treboux at Le Manoir.

Robert Treboux bought Le Veau d'Or in 1985. When he died, his daughter Catherine Treboux ran it until she sold it in 2019.

Robert Treboux is credited in the Baseball Hall of Fame due to his restaurant La Rotisserie. Michael Lewis states in Moneyball (page 86 ), “In 1980 a group of friends, led by Sports Illustrated writer Dan Okrent, met at La Rotisserie Francaise, a restaurant in Manhattan, and created what became known as, to the confusion of a nation, as Rotisserie Baseball”.
