= Ross Campbell (writer) =

Australian journalist and humorist

Ross McKay Campbell (26 December 1910 – 24 February 1982) was an Australian humorist.

== History ==
Campbell was born in Kalgoorlie, Western Australia, eldest son of Alice Jean Nicol Campbell, née Paulin, (died 1949) and Douglas McKay Campbell (1884–1960), goldfields inspector and a member of the Kalgoorlie Operatic Society known for humorous performances and organisational ability. Around 1912 the family moved to Melbourne, living at 13 Denmark Hill Road, Upper Hawthorn. Later homes were at Clapham street, Thornbury and 15 Powlett Street, Heidelberg.

Campbell's stellar scholastic career began at Thornbury Primary School, where he was dux for two years and won scholarships to Scotch College, and another to Ormond College at Melbourne University, culminating in the 1933 Rhodes Scholarship, which took him to Magdalen College, Oxford University, studying literature.

He joined The Daily Telegraph, then with the onset of World War II joined the RAAF, served as Flying Officer attached to the RAF, and was awarded a DFC. After the fall of Germany, Campbell was engaged in compiling a history of Bomber Command. Around this time he met Ruth Hazel Seale, who was with Australian Consolidated Press; they married on 11 December 1946 at Croton-on-Hudson, New York where he was working for the Sydney Morning Herald.

He subsequently wrote for the Telegraph, Australian Women's Weekly and The Bulletin. His gently humorous column in The Weekly was enjoyed by Australians for 22 years.

Campbell and wife Ruth settled in Greenwich, Sydney, in a house he referred to in his columns as "Oxalis Cottage"; they had three daughters including the artist Cressida Campbell and the actress Nell Campbell and a son, known to his readers as "Theodora", "Lancelot", "Little Nell" and "Baby Pip". He died age 71 after a long illness and was cremated.

== Publications ==
- Daddy Are You Married (1962)
- Mummy, Who Is Your Husband (1964)
- She Can't Play My Bagpipes (1970)
- My Life as a Father (2005)
- An Urge to Laugh (1981 autobiography)
