= Arthur McNalty =

Arthur McNalty may refer to:

- Arthur MacNalty (1880–1969), British Chief Medical Officer
- Arthur George McNalty (1871–1958), British Army officer
