= Patrick Clark (chef) =

American chef (1955–1998)

- Born: Patrick Dean Clark; March 17, 1955; Brooklyn, New York City, U.S.
- Died: February 11, 1998 (aged 42); Princeton, New Jersey, U.S.
- Occupation: Chef
- Years active: 1981–1998
- Spouse: Lynette (m. 1979)
- Children: 5
- Awards: 1994 James Beard Foundation: "Best Chef: Mid-Atlantic Region"

Patrick Dean Clark (March 17, 1955 – February 11, 1998) was an American chef. He won the 1994 James Beard Foundation award for "Best Chef: Mid-Atlantic Region" during his tenure at the Hay-Adams Hotel, Washington, D.C. and also competed in the 1997 Iron Chef. Clark is credited with having been the first chef in New York City to mix fine-dining and bistro at The Odeon in Tribeca, as well as also having been one of the first American chefs to apply French technique to growing American regional cuisine in the late 1970s and early 1980s.

== Early life ==
Clark was born in Brooklyn, New York City, the son of Melvin, also a chef, and Idella. He was raised in Canarsie, a residential neighborhood in Brooklyn, New York. He trained and worked in Britain and France, notably with three-star chef Michel Guérard.

== Career ==
In 1988, he opened his own restaurant, Metro, on the Upper East Side. It closed in 1990 and he went to work at Bice in Beverly Hills. He soon returned to the East Coast, taking over the kitchen at the Hay–Adams Hotel. In 1995, he returned to New York City to become Executive chef at Tavern on the Green.

He has been hailed as "one of the greatest American culinary stars of the last half-century"

Chef Anthony Bourdain describes the impression he made: "Patrick for sure impressed the hell out of us. He was kind of famous; he was big and black; most importantly he was American, not some cheese-eating, surrender specialist Froggie. Patrick Clark, whether he would have appreciated it or not, was our home-town hero, our Joe DiMaggio – a shining example that it could be done."

== Personal life ==
In 1979, he married Lynette. The couple had five children: two sons and three daughters. At the time of his death, he and his family were living in Plainsboro Township, New Jersey.

=== Death ===
Clark died of amyloidosis, a rare blood disease, on February 11, 1998, at the Princeton Medical Center in Princeton, New Jersey. He was 42. His wife and their five children survived him.
