= John McInally =

John McInally is the name of:

- John McInally (footballer, born 1915), Scottish footballer for Celtic
- John McInally (footballer, born 1951), Scottish footballer for Lincoln City and Colchester United
