= McNally =

McNally may refer to:

- McNally (surname), an Irish surname
- McNally (crater), a crater on the Moon
- Re Wakim; Ex parte McNally, a case decided in the High Court of Australia
- McNally v. United States, a court case on the definition of mail fraud

== See also ==
- Bishop McNally High School in Calgary, Alberta, Canada
- McNally High School in Edmonton, Alberta, Canada
- McNally Robinson, a small chain of Canadian independent bookstores
- McNally Smith College of Music, a music school based in Saint Paul, Minnesota
- Rand McNally, a publishing company
