= McAnally =

McAnally Mac Conallaidh
- Language: Irish

Origin
- Origin: Mac Con Allaidh; Mac Conallaigh
- Meaning: 'son of the wild hound'
- Region of origin: Ulster

Other names
- Variant forms: McNally, McAnalty, McNalty, Nalty, Conalty, Connally
- Cognates: Mac Conallta, Ó Conallta

McAnally is an Irish surname. It is the Anglicized form of Gaelic Mac Conallaidh meaning 'son of Cú Allaidh' ('wild hound', 'wolf'). The death of the progenitor – Conchobhar mac Con Allaidh, lord of Cenél Moain, in Ulster – is recorded in the Annals of the Four Masters in 1178.

In Ulster, McAnally, and its common variant spelling McNally, is unrelated to the Mayo name Mac an Fhailghigh ('son of the poor man'). It is however etymologically related to Mac Conallta, a County Sligo sept, and Ó Conallta ('son/descendant of Cú Allta'; a variant of Cú Allaidh).

== History ==
The MacAnallys were of the Cenél nEógain, a large and powerful confederation of clans descended from Eógan mac Néill (fl. 5th century), son of Niall of the Nine Hostages. The MacAnally sept of County Tyrone were descended from Conchobar mac Con Allaidh (fl. 12th century), chieftain of Cenél Moain. A minor sept derived from their eponym Cú Allaidh Ó Luinigh, the family fostered Niall Conallagh O'Neill, tanist of Tyrone, who derived his sobriquet. A prominent branch ruled from their seat of Lisanally (Irish: Lios Chon Allaidh, lit. 'fort of the wolf') in what is now County Armagh. Another branch settled in Clandeboye, County Antrim and became hereditary physicians to the O'Neill Kings of Clandeboye (Léigh Mac Con Allaidh). In the 17th century, the family lands were confiscated following the Flight of the Earls and subsequent Plantation of Ulster.

The status of the family is fully recognized in the Annals of Ulster and Ceart Uí Néill.

== Notable people ==
- Aonghus McAnally (born 1955), Irish broadcaster, entertainer and billiards player
- Bill McAnally (born 1965), American racing driver and team owner
- Charles McAnally (1836–1905), United States Army officer
- Conor McAnally (born 1952), Irish television writer, producer, and director
- Ernie McAnally (born 1946), American baseball player
- John McAnally (born 1945), British Vice Admiral
- Mac McAnally (born 1957), American singer-songwriter
- Mary McAnally (1945–2016), British TV producer
- Ray McAnally (1926–1989), Irish actor
- Robert McAnally (1882–1959), Australian composer and conductor
- Ron McAnally (born 1932), American horse trainer
- Shane McAnally (born 1974), American musician and songwriter

== See also ==
- McNally (surname)
- Nally
- Branches of the Cenél nEógain
