= Cressida Campbell =

Australian artist (born 1960)

Cressida Campbell AM
- Born: Cressida Rosemary Campbell; 8 July 1960 (age 66); Sydney, Australia
- Spouse: Warren Macris (m. 2022)
- Parent(s): Ross Campbell, Ruth Campbell
- Relatives: Nell Campbell (sister) Sally Campbell (sister)

Cressida Rosemary Campbell AM (born 8 July 1960) is an Australian artist.

== Early life and education ==
Cressida Rosemary Campbell was born on 8 July 1960 in Sydney to Ruth and Ross Campbell.

She studied at East Sydney Technical College in 1978 and 1979. Her older sister is actress Nell Campbell.

== Career ==
Campbell held her first solo show in Sydney in 1979. Campbell spent several weeks at the Yoshida Hanga Academy in Tokyo in 1985. From this she learned how to lead the eye around the picture plane using composition. Through the 1990s and the 2000s, she showed work with Rex Irwin Art Dealer. Since 1994 she has shown with Phillip Bacon Galleries in Brisbane who is considered to be her prime dealer. Later Campbell worked with the Sophie Gannon gallery in Melbourne. She exhibited in London in 2001 (when Germaine Greer introduced her at the opening) and 2003.

A major exhibition surveying her work was held at the National Gallery of Australia in Canberra from September 2022 though to February 2023. It was the highest attended exhibition for a living artist in Australian history.

Her technique has centered on carving and painting her woodblocks in preparation for hand-printing them. An image is drawn on wood, carved, then painted with up to three coats of paint. It is then wetted and a single print is made. The block is repainted briefly to replace any significant loss of detail, the print is then hand painted for up to a period of months to create a fully resolved artwork. Two artworks are therefore created - one on paper, and one on wood. Her work emphasizes colour and design. It echoes the flattened picture plane of Japanese ukiyo-e-prints, whilst being anchored in contemporary Australia. The Japanese artist Kitagawa Utamaro is one of several artists who have influenced her work. Campbell exhibits prints and hand painted woodblocks as artworks in their own right.

One of Campbell's woodblocks was sold at the highest price for a living Australian women artist in 2022.

Campbell's technique is based on 'white line' printmaking, a technique pioneered by the Provincetown Printers of Massachusetts in 1913. She is described as following in the footsteps of Margaret Preston and Thea Proctor. She created a suite of painted woodblocks to celebrate the life and home of Campbell's friend and fellow artist, Margaret Olley.

== Recognition and honours ==
Campbell was appointed a Member of the Order of Australia in the 2024 Australia Day Honours for "significant service to the visual arts".

Two photos of Campbell are featured in the National Portrait Gallery in Canberra.

== Personal life ==
In 1991, Campbell married Peter Crayford (1951-2011), who had ongoing health problems, which caused them to decide against having children. Since 2001, she has lived in the Sydney suburb of Bronte, in her home studio. In April 2022 she married fine art printer and photographer Warren Macris.

== Selected exhibitions ==
Solo:

- Cressida Campbell, survey exhibition, 24 Sep 2022 – 19 Feb 2023, National Gallery of Australia, Canberra
- Timeless: The art of Cressida Campbell, 10 January – 22 February 2009, National Trust S H Ervin Gallery, Sydney
- Cressida Campbell, 7–22 July 2005, Nevill Keating Pictures, London
- Cressida Campbell (Masks, Paintings and Things), 29 September – 14 October 1979, Hogarth Galleries, Paddington, NSW

Group:

- Cutting Through Time—Cressida Campbell, Margaret Preston, and the Japanese Print, 18 May - 28 July 2024, Geelong Gallery, Geelong, Victoria
- Preview for Dalia Stanley Auctioneers, 4 August 1995 - 5 August 1995, Mary Place Gallery, Paddington, NSW
- Speaking of Women, 8 March 1995 - 8 June 1995, Art Gallery of New South Wales, Sydney
- Sydney prints: 45 years of the Sydney Printmakers, S.H. Ervin Gallery (19 August 2006 – 24 September 2006), Hawkesbury Regional Gallery (9 February 2007 – 11 March 2007) and Tamworth Regional Gallery (24 March 2007 – 29 April 2007)
- Transformations: Australian Perspecta '85: Project 50, 24 October 1985, Art Gallery of New South Wales, Sydney

== Collections ==
Campbell's work is held in the following collections:

- Art Gallery of New South Wales
- National Gallery of Australia (NGA)

NGA director Nick Mitzevich said in 2022 that Campbell was among the most privately collected artists of Australia.

== See also ==
- Provincetown printmaking (also known as White Line printmaking)
