= Nell's =

Former New York City restaurant and nightclub

- Interactive map of Nell's
- Address: 244 West 14th Street
- Location: New York City
- Coordinates: 40.7394°N 74.002°W
- Type: nightclub

Construction
- Opened: 1986
- Closed: May 30, 2004

Nell's (or Nells) was a nightclub located on 244 West 14th Street in the Greenwich Village neighborhood of Manhattan. It opened in the fall of 1986 in the space of a former electronics store and closed May 30, 2004.

== History ==
Nell's opened in the fall of 1986 in the space of a former electronics store. It came onto the scene when some clubgoers were tiring of the cavernous discothèques (e.g., Studio 54) popular in the 1970s and early 1980s. Decorated as a slightly shabby 19th-century English men's club, Nell's afforded its upscale patrons a place to eat, sit, socialize, and listen to live music. Other exclusive supper clubs like M.K. and Au Bar soon followed.

Actress-singer Nell Campbell was its namesake and longtime proprietress. Initially, she co-owned the club with Lynn Wagenknecht and Keith McNally. McNally gave up ownership when he and Wagenknecht divorced. The painter Thomas Moller was Nell's original manager. Moller takes credit for attracting New York's art scene to the club. Also a 1985 Interview Magazine included Nell and Christian Lepanto in different articles. Christian L worked as coatcheck and introduced Semour Stein to Tommy Page. At its peak of popularity in the late 1980s, with a capacity of only 250, Nell's was known for denying even the famous entry to the club.

It was the quiet hookup place for Rob Lowe and Melissa Gilbert. Prince also visited as well as Al Franken. It was the last nightclub Andy Warhol attended with Dionne Warwick just before his botched hospital visit in which he died. On June 4, 1987, artist Robert Mapplethorpe and actress Susan Sarandon hosted a dinner for AIDS charity amfAR at Nell's. Duran Duran frontman Simon Le Bon and his wife Yasmin Le Bon frequented the night club in the 80's and 90's.

In the 1990s, Nell's matured into a jazz, reggae, and hip-hop showcase.

Run-DMC was often known to take over the DJ booth on any given night. In 1995, The Notorious B.I.G. made his video for "Big Poppa" there. It was also there in 1993 that Tupac met a woman who accused him of sexual assault

Nell's was also a frequent haunt of fictional character Patrick Bateman, in the book American Psycho by Bret Easton Ellis.

In early 2004, actor Mark Wahlberg was planning to buy Nell's. It closed on May 30, 2004.

The space later held a private club NA opened by actor Chris Noth and his business partner Noel Ashman. Noel Ashman then teamed up with new partners to open semi-private club NA in 2005. Several other clubs opened and closed in the space before the space split into two to become Stash nightclub, which lies underneath Snap Sports Bar.
