= John McInally (footballer, born 1915) =

Scottish footballer (born 1915)

Personal information
- Date of birth: 17 May 1915
- Place of birth: Blantyre, Scotland
- Position: Inside forward

Youth career
- Wishaw Juniors

Senior career*
Years	Team	Apps	(Gls)
1934–1937	Celtic	9	(4)
1937–1946	Arbroath		
1946–1947	Cowdenbeath		
- Ballymena United
- * Club domestic league appearances and goals

John McInally (born 17 May 1915) was a Scottish professional footballer who played as an inside forward.

== Career ==
Born in Blantyre, McInally played for Wishaw Juniors, Celtic, Arbroath, Cowdenbeath and Ballymena United

McInally is deceased.
