= Kitty Pilgrim =

American journalist

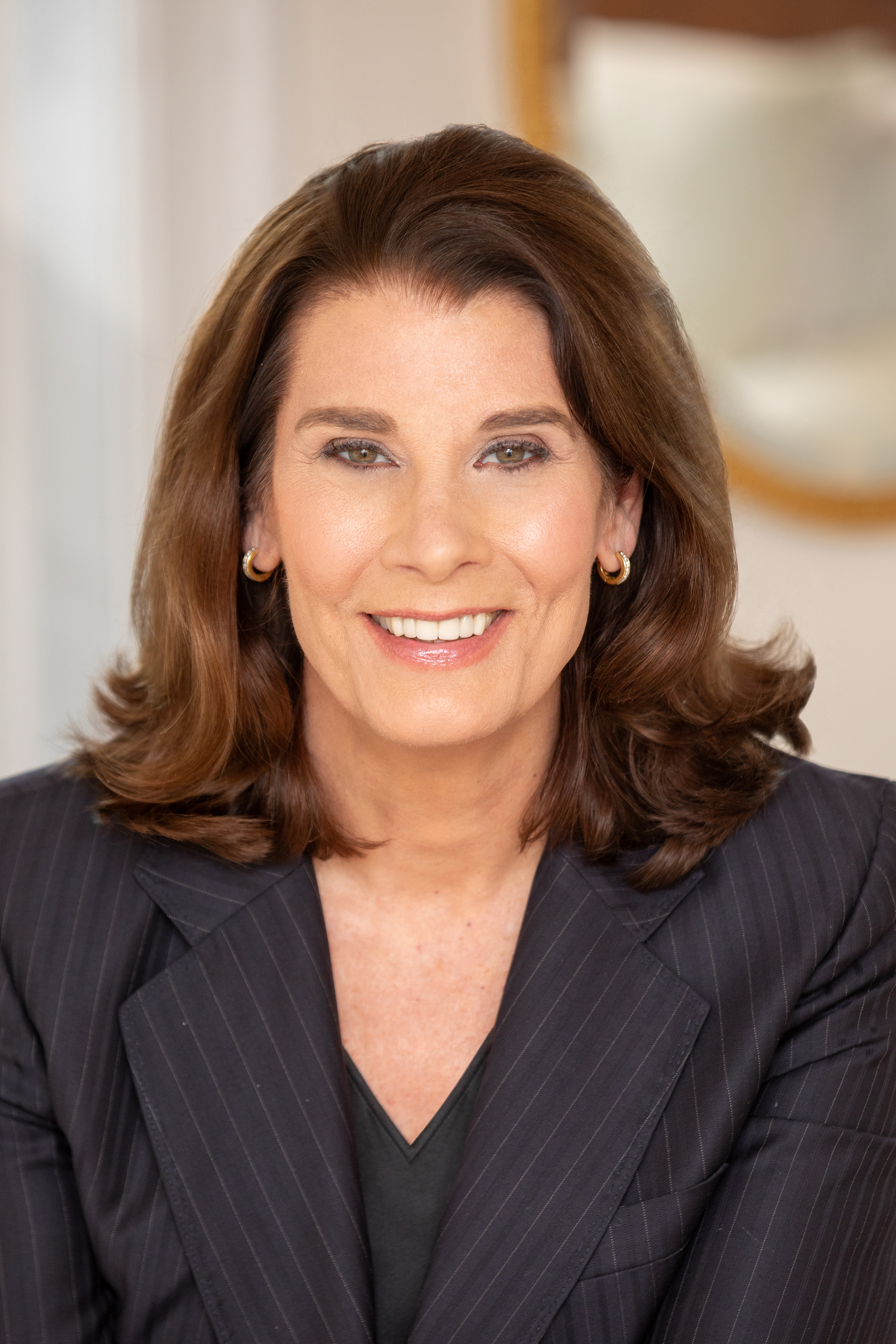
- Education: Manhattanville College (BA); Columbia University (MA)
- Occupations: Journalist, Foreign Policy Expert, advocate for Women Peace and Security
- Website: www.kittypilgrimbooks.com

Kathryn Pilgrim, known professionally as Kitty Pilgrim, has worked throughout her career as international journalist and author. She was a CNN anchor and correspondent for 25 years. She is active in the world of foreign policy, covering many international issues. She is currently a lifetime member of the Council on Foreign Relations and is founder of her own company, Kitty Pilgrim Media, based in New York.

Pilgrim is a devoted advocate of Women Peace and Security and gives speeches on that topic in many venues around the world. As one of the early reporters at CNN she is often asked to speak on the role of the media in society. She publishes her own podcast Pilgrim's Progress - a program that interviews women who make a difference in their communities and the world.

== Education, fellowships and organizations ==
She is a lifetime member of the Council on Foreign Relations, a member of Chatham House in London, and a member of the NACFP, National Committee on American Foreign Policy. In 2024 she became a adjunct senior fellow in the Office of the president at East-West Center in Honolulu. She accepted a nonresident Fellowship in Women Peace and Security at WIIS (Women in International Security) in 2024 and continues to work with that organization as a board member. Many of her academic fellowships involve security issues in various regions of the world. She was a fellow at the Salzburg Global Seminar in Salzburg, Austria, for Asian Pacific security, a fellow at the East–West Center in Honolulu, Hawaii, for Asian economic and security issues, and a Hong Kong journalism fellow and a fellow in the East–West Center's Korean Journalism exchange.

Pilgrim graduated from Manhattanville College in Purchase, New York, with a degree in political science. She studied Russian, economics and political science, which ultimately led to her career in journalism. She delivered the commencement speech for the Class of 2012, earning an honorary Doctor of Humane Letters from Manhattanville College. She currently teaches Women Peace and Security and Critical Thinking at Manhattanville College in Purchase, New York. In 2025, she is teaching in the Leadership for Change program at the Bard College summer session in Brooklyn, New York.

She has a master's from the School of International and Public Affairs (SIPA) at Columbia University. She attended the Harriman Institute for Advanced Study of the Soviet Union. In 2024 she earned a Graduate Certificate in International Security from Harvard Extension School. In 2025 she earned a certificate at Harvard Business School's Executive Women's Leadership Program.

She is interested in science and exploration, particularly ocean science and arctic regions, and is a fellow in the Royal Geographical Society in London, and a full member of the Explorer's Club of New York City. . She participates in various scientific meetings on oceanography and arctic security.

== Journalist ==
Pilgrim worked as New York-based anchor and correspondent for CNN for 25 years. Her travels have taken her on special assignments to Russia, Cuba, China, Japan, South Korea, Europe, and parts of Africa. In domestic reporting she covered economics, politics, and a range of other topics. She was part of the CNN team that broadcast continuously in New York during the September 11 attacks and in the weeks thereafter.

Kitty Pilgrim began her career as a New York City-based news anchor and correspondent for CNN, starting in 1986 as a production assistant, and was named correspondent shortly thereafter. She anchored her own morning show, Early Edition, in 1998 and 1999 and served as an anchor for CNN, CNNI, CNNfn, and Headline News for more than a decade. Starting in 2001, she was prime-time back-up anchor for the 7PM hour on CNN, a position she held for a decade.

She also served as a correspondent for CNN's Southeast Bureau and was the lead correspondent in CNN's coverage of the Birmingham, Alabama anti-abortion violence in 1998 and the subsequent hunt for suspect Eric Rudolph. She was also part of the CNN Moneyline team that won an Overseas Press Club Award for its live broadcasts from Havana, Cuba, in 1995. Pilgrim has won an Emmy, Peabody and the New York Society of Black Journalists Award for field reporting on social and economic issues in South Africa.

== Author and speaking engagements ==
Pilgrim travels the world on speaking engagements regarding Women Peace and Security, Leadership Communications and the role of the media. Her recent appearances include multiple panels at the annual global meeting of the Women's Forum for the Economy and Society in Paris, the Annual Women Peace and Security Symposium at the Naval War College, training seminars at US Naval Postgraduate School in Monterey California, the Women Peace and Security Series at the Military Women's Memorial, the New York Times TEDx lecture series.

Pilgrim has also written fiction - romantic thrillers with an international flavor, featuring an archaeologist John Sinclair, and a female oceanographer, Cordelia Stapleton. In 2010 she signed a two-book deal with New York publisher Charles Scribner's Sons. Her novels The Explorer's Code. and The Stolen Chalice, were published by Scribner. Her third novel "Summer of Fire" came out in 2014. Her romantic thrillers are characterized by their diverse locations and "around the world" approach. Her debut novel, The Explorer's Code, was quickly followed by a sequel "the Stolen Chalice". A third novel based on the same characters. "Summer of Fire" was published by River Grove.

== Family ==
Kathryn Pilgrim is the great-nice of Olympian Paul Henry Pilgrim (1883–1958), an American runner. He competed at the 1904, 1906 and 1908 Olympics and won three gold medals in 1904 and 1906. He later became the Athletic Director of the New York Athletic Club from 1914 to 1953. Kathryn Pilgrim (nee Overbagh) is the direct descendent of Maria Van Leuven Overbagh and Peter A. Overbagh (1779–1842), and portraits of both ancestors were painted by the American painter Ammi Phillips.
