= Vincent S. Burke =

American politician (1920–2001)

Member of the Iowa Senate from the 39th district
- In office January 11, 1965 – January 8, 1967

Personal details
- Born: Vincent Sanders Burke; May 17, 1920 Luverne, Minnesota, U.S.
- Died: February 2, 2001 (aged 80)
- Party: Democratic
- Spouse: Mary
- Children: 3
- Education: East High School; Morningside College; University of South Dakota
- Occupation: Politician

Military service
- Allegiance: United States
- Branch/service: United States Army (United States Army Air Forces)
- Battles/wars: World War II

Vincent Sanders Burke (May 17, 1920 – February 2, 2001) was an American politician.

Vincent Burke was born to parents James M. and Marion F. Sanders Burke on May 17, 1920. The Burke family later moved from Vincent's birthplace of Luverne, Minnesota, and he graduated from East High School and Morningside College in Sioux City, Iowa. From his teenage years, Burke was interested in aviation and stunt flying. During World War II, he served in the United States Army Air Forces, with the rank of staff sergeant. After earning his bachelor's degree in business administration and sociology, Burke obtained a master's degree in communications at the University of South Dakota in 1972. He died on February 2, 2001, aged 80, survived by his wife, two daughters, and a son.

Burke worked for Iowa Vocational Rehabilitation Services. He was elected to the Iowa Senate in 1964, and served District 39 from January 11, 1965, to January 8, 1967, alongside James M. McNally, as a lawmaker affiliated with the Democratic Party.
