= Sonia McNally =

British visual artist

Sonia McNally (born 5 March 1973) is a British visual artist, known for her work in painting glass and object making, as well as her paintings.

== Early career (1998-2003) ==
Prior to focusing on fine art, McNally (previously Marriott), ran a wedding and party decoration business, Big Sky Productions and was awarded the Institute of Directors Award with the Prince's Trust for the Best Marketing Campaign

McNally also worked as a scenic artist, set builder, costume maker, and props and model maker for film, television, theatre, and community art projects. She contributed to productions for the National Theatre, M&C Saatchi, and films including One Life and Sexy Beast, as well as several television advertisements.

== Art career (2003-present) ==
In 2004, while studying, McNally co-founded Dartmoor Artists Week with Jennifer Blake, a series of residential painting trips.

McNally has written and illustrated two artists poetry books: Euphrosyne and the Harty Spring, which was published in 2022, and The Hand of God (2023), which was shown in an exhibition in the Jewish Seminary in Manhattan. She also illustrated P. Kinton's children's book 'Wishing for Wizards and Chips for Tea' 2010.

From 2011 to 2013, she was commissioned by Rev. Rachel Webbley to create a 12-metre acid-etched glass screen commemorating the martyrdom of St Alphege. Research for the project included translation of Old English texts by Dr Hilary Powell, a period of Ignatian spiritual direction, and study of medieval stained glass. During this period, she led workshops and courses for St Alphege CE Infant School and mentored students. She also organised an eight-mile sponsored run to raise money for these projects.

McNally taught at Canterbury Christchurch University between 2008 and 2020 in the Department of Media, Art and Design, and between 2013 and 2018, she taught theurgy on the creative module on the MA Myth, Cosmology and the Sacred at Canterbury Christ Church University.

== Selected exhibitions ==
- 2024: POW (Power of Women): Rest, Liquid Landscapes, 101 Social, Margate
- 2023: Genesis, Jewish Theological Seminary, New York (including the panel The Art of Creation and the Role of the Feminine in the Secular and the Sacred with Karenna Gore)
- 2014: I Offer You These Feet with Liz Jones. Sculptural piece using steel, plaster and cast concrete, Canterbury Festival
- 2013: Permanent Collection, St Alphege Church, Whitstable, Kent : 12 metre acid etched glass screen depicting the Life and Martyrdom of St Alphege
- 2013: Celebrating the Story of St Alphege in the Millennium of his Death, Canterbury Festival

== Videos ==
- 2025: Capturing the Spirit of Many Moons Ago (film), Bizarre, Fox Yard Studio
- 2019: Old Bill & Sausage Robbers (film documenting 50 years of Manor of Faversham Freemasons Lodge)
- 2011–2013: The Story of St Alphege etched glass screen, Whitstable

== Publications and media ==
- 2025: Faversham Life – profile on St Alphege project
- 2022: Euphrosyne and the Harty Spring Illustrated artists poetry book
- 2022: Kent Online feature on Canterbury International Arts Festival
- 2021: Meeting Vikings in English Churches, Churches Conservation Trust
- 2021: The Creative Podcast (Parts 1 and 2)
- 2014: Canterbury Times - Hot footing it to festival sculpture, Canterbury Festival 2014
- 2014: Canterbury Festival: Kent's International Arts Festival
- 2013: Canterbury Festival: Kent's International Arts Festival
- 2013: Art and Christianity 75 ( ISSN 1746-6229) on St Alphege Glass Screen
- 2010: Illustrator for 'Wishing for Wizards and Chips for Tea'
- 2009: Resurgence featuring artwork 'Tree at Night' illustrating poem
