= The Odeon =

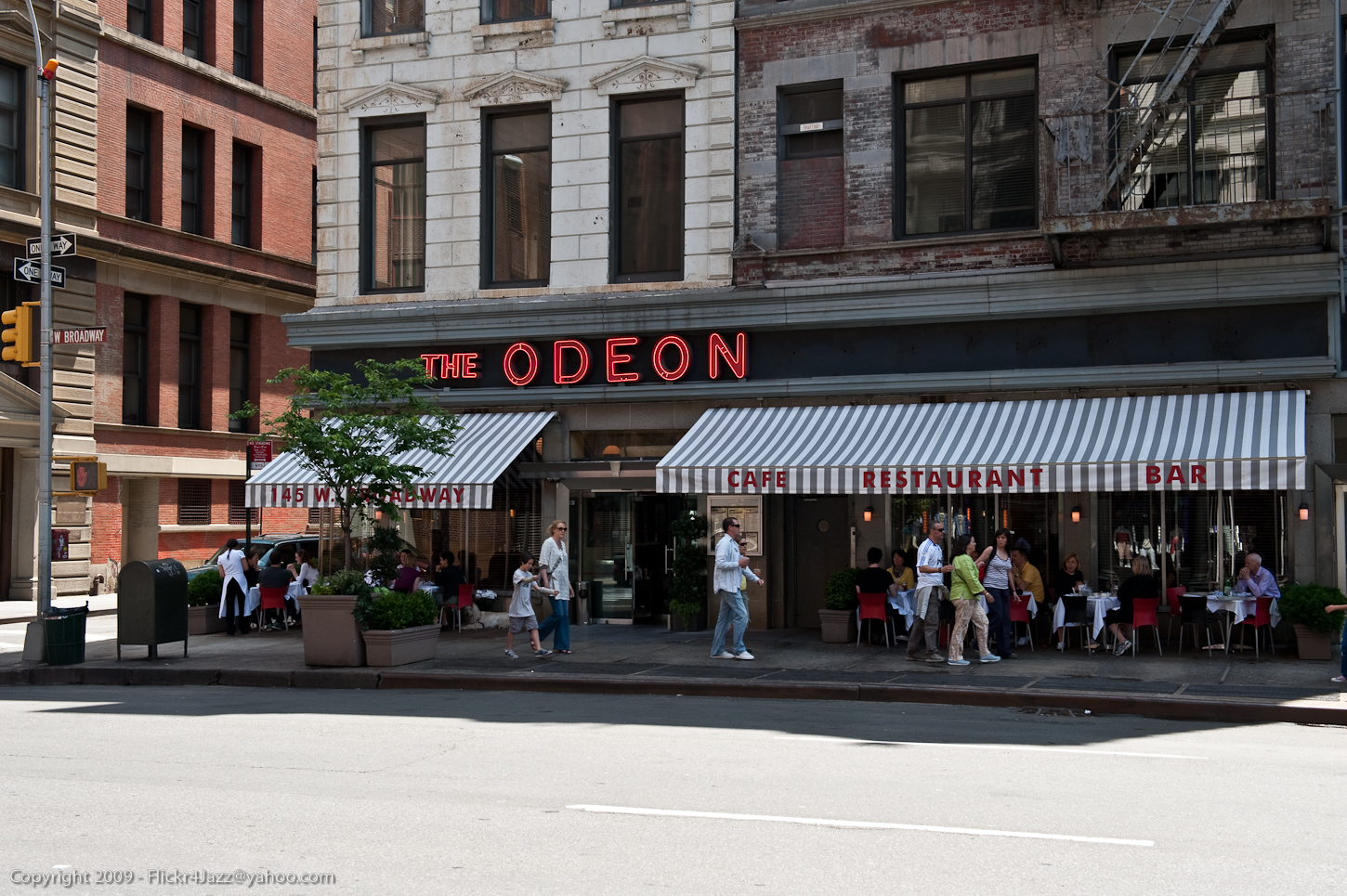
- The restaurant's exterior in 2009
- Interactive map of The Odeon

Restaurant information
- Location: 145 West Broadway, New York City, New York, United States
- Coordinates: 40°43′01″N 74°00′28″W

The Odeon is a restaurant in New York City. The restaurant opened in 1980, in space previously occupied by Towers Cafeteria. The restaurant was founded by Lynn Wagenknecht, Keith McNally, and Brian McNally. Wagenknecht continues to run the restaurant. Wagenknecht has characterized the restaurant as a brasserie.

== History ==
Before founding The Odeon, Lynn Wagenknecht and brothers Keith McNally Brian McNally all worked at One Fifth, another Manhattan restaurant. Keith McNally and Wagenknecht developed the idea for The Odeon while on a vacation in Paris in 1979. The Odeon opened in 1980, in space previously occupied by Towers Cafeteria, and was named for the movie theater frequented by Keith and Brian as children. Early investors in the restaurant included Alan Bennett. Patrick Clark was The Odeon's first chef. Keith and Brian experienced tension while running the restaurant. Brian ceased working at The Odeon in 1982 and moved to Paris. He later returned to New York City and opened the restaurant Indochine. Bar Odeon, a "spin-off" located across the street from The Odeon, was replaced by another restaurant in 2002.

The restaurant experienced a renewal in its popularity and cachet in the 2010s. Jacob Bernstein, writing for the New York Times, attributed this surge in part to the relocation of the offices of media company Condé Nast, to the nearby One World Trade Center. During the COVID-19 pandemic, the restaurant built an outdoor dining structure, with seating on both West Broadway and Thomas Street. The structure collapsed in December 2021 due to wind, injuring one person.

== Reception ==
Critics from The New York Times have given The Odeon a full review in 1980, 1986, 1989, and 2016. Moira Hodgson, the first critic to review the restaurant for The New York Times, in 1980, praised chef Patrick Clark's cooking and the service. Hodgson also noted the clientele, referring to them as "pillars of the art world". Hodgson awarded the restaurant two stars. Bryan Miller, reviewing The Odeon in 1986 for the Times, awarded the restaurant one star. In 1989, Miller reviewed the restaurant again and awarded it two stars. Pete Wells, in a 2016 review, awarded the restaurant one star, and emphasized the sense of comfort that dining at the restaurant brought him.

== Reputation, influence, and clientele ==
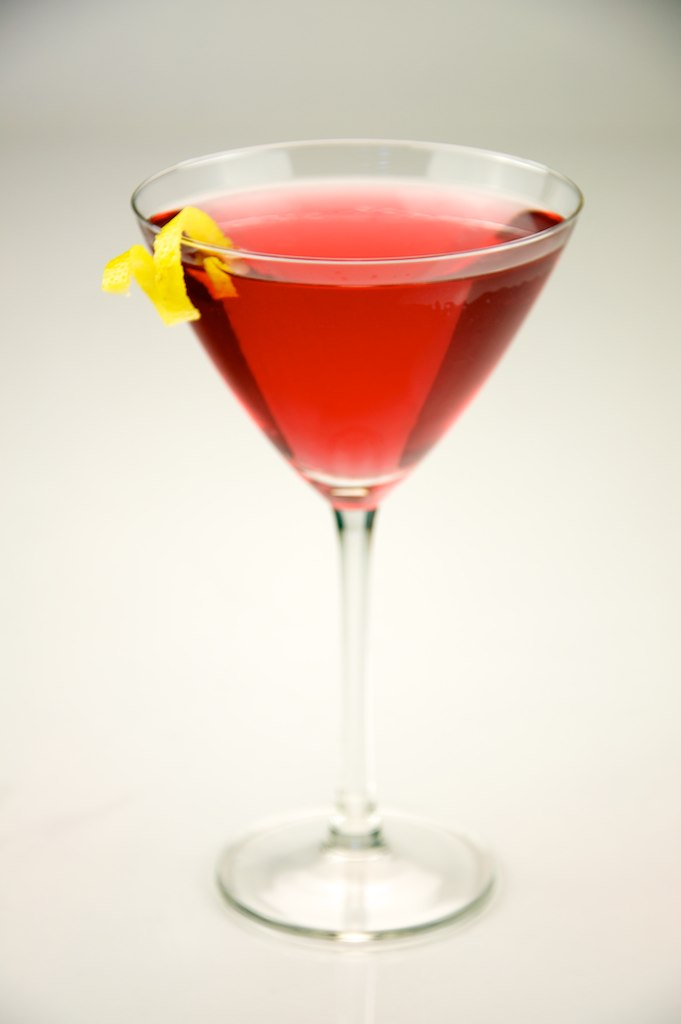
A cosmopolitan

The Odeon has been referred to as a "classic" New York City restaurant. In his 1989 review, Bryan Miller commented that the restaurant was already "called an institution" despite having been open for less than ten years. William Grimes referred to The Odeon as "ageless and definitively downtown" in a 2000 review of Village, a restaurant opened by former Odeon chef Stephen Lyle. Stephen Heyman, writing for Surface, described The Odeon and other restaurants operated by Keith McNally as gradually transitioning from a "forward operating bases of gentrification" to "important parts of the city's heritage". The restaurant has been credited with inspiring imitators hoping to mimic its ambience and success.

Scenes in Jay McInerney's novel Bright Lights, Big City take place at The Odeon, and the exterior was depicted on the book's first edition cover. McInerney has said that attorneys at his publishing house were concerned about depictions of drug use at the restaurant in the novel, so McInerney sought Keith McNally's permission to portray the restaurant in and on the book. McNally granted permission assuming the novel would not sell well. The exterior was also featured in the opening credits of Saturday Night Live. A celebration commemorating the 20th anniversary of the novel's publication was held at the restaurant.

The Odeon is known for its celebrity clientele. Regulars at the restaurant have at points included Jean-Michel Basquiat, John Belushi, and Andy Warhol. Lena Dunham has a tattoo of the restaurant's sign. In addition to its popularity with celebrities, the restaurant was at one point popular among Wall Street quants.

=== Invention of the Cosmopolitan ===
Toby Cecchini and Melissa Huffsmith-Roth, bartenders at The Odeon in the 1980s, have been credited with inventing the Cosmopolitan cocktail, with Cecchini sometimes receiving solo credit. When asked about claims the drink was invented at The Odeon in an interview with Bon Appétit, Keith McNally said "Nothing could be closer to the truth."
