= Arthur George McNalty =

British Army general (1871–1958)

Brigadier-General Arthur George McNalty CMG CBE
- Born: Arthur George Preston McNalty; 6 June 1871
- Died: 2 September 1958 (aged 87)

Brigadier-General Arthur George Preston McNalty CMG CBE (6 June 1871 – 2 September 1958) was a British Army field commander of both the Second Boer War and the First World War.

== Military career ==
McNalty was commissioned a second lieutenant on 3 August 1901. He saw active service in South Africa during the Second Boer War (1899–1902), for which he received the Queen's South Africa Medal (campaign medal) with 5 battle clasps. Attached to the Army Service Corps, he was promoted to lieutenant on 3 August 1902, while still in South Africa. McNalty served thereafter with the British Army of Occupation in Egypt from 1911 to 1914. Arthur McNalty served, finally, from 1914 to 1919 during WWI in Egypt, Turkey (during the Dardanelles Campaign or Battle of Gallipoli) and France, during which he had 6 combat despatches and completed his service as a Brigadier General or Brigadier (in field command, a commander of a brigade or three battalions, that is approximately 3000 troops). In France, Arthur McNalty was severely wounded. McNalty, subsequently, acted as Director General of grave registrations and enquiries from 1919 and until his retirement from service in the British Armed Forces in 1920.

== Family ==
=== Wife and children ===
Arthur McNalty married in 1905 Margaret Maude de Windt, eldest daughter of Harry de Windt, but they divorced in 1921. There were two children of the marriage:

- Frances Joy St. George McNalty (b. 1907)
- Peter Geoffrey Bourchier McNalty (b. 1909).

=== Father ===
Arthur McNalty's father, British Army brigade surgeon Lt. Col. George William McNalty, MD, LRCSI, FRCSI, CB (1837–1912) invented (1873) the "iron wire folding fracture box" or splint, which was intended for use on the battlefield and in mass casualty situations and which foreshadowed the German surgeon Friedrich Cramer's (1847–1903) later invention of the Cramer wire ladder splint or the malleable wire ladder splint, which was developed for the same purposes and which is still used widely to this day individually or in multiple for emergency splint of fractured limbs. The Lieutenant Colonel served with the British Ambulance Service during the Franco-Prussian War and also served in the Ashanti War (1873–74), the Russo-Turkish War, the Second Anglo-Afghan War, and the Anglo-Egyptian War. He was the Honorary Surgeon to the Viceroy of India. He retired from the British Army in 1892.

=== Sisters ===
George William McNalty's daughter and Arthur George McNalty's sister, Elizabeth Ann McNulty, was the wife of the Irish surgeon Andrew Sexton Gray, who is known as the "founder of ophthalmology in Australia". An infant sister Georgina Lucy McNalty died on 15 September 1875.

== See also ==
- List of British generals and brigadiers
