= Minetta Tavern =

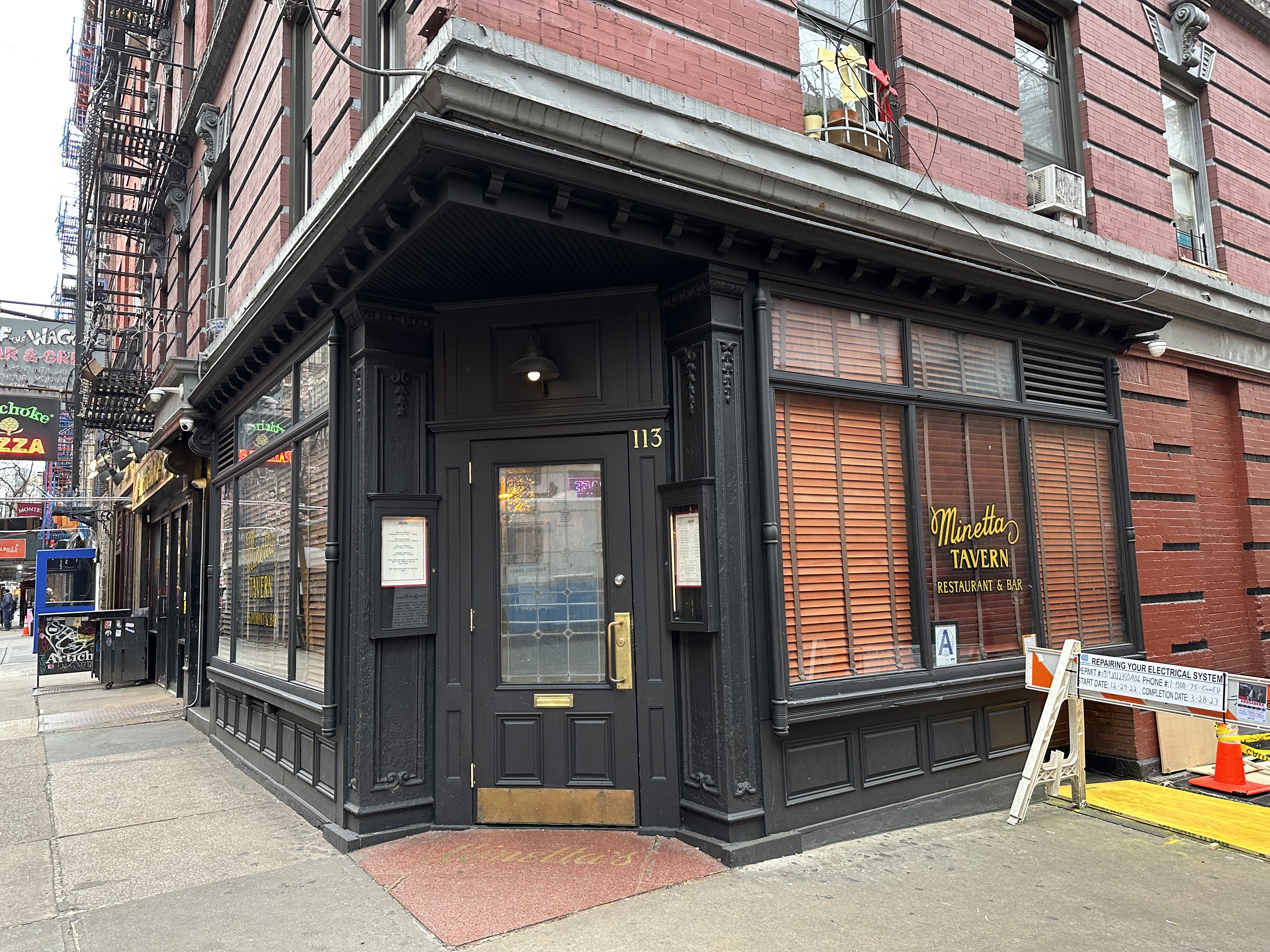
- Interactive map of Minetta Tavern

Restaurant information
- Established: 1937
- Owner: Keith McNally
- Previous owners: Taka Becovic, Eddie "Minetta" Sieveri
- Food type: Steakhouse, gastropub
- Location: 113 Macdougal Street, Manhattan, New York, 10012
- Coordinates: 40°43′48″N 74°0′2.5″W
- Other locations: 1287 4th Street NE, Washington, D.C.
- Website: www.minettatavernny.com

Minetta Tavern is a restaurant owned by Keith McNally in Greenwich Village. In 2009, Frank Bruni of The New York Times gave the Tavern three stars. It served as a popular spot for writers like e.e. cummings, Ernest Hemingway, Eugene O'Neill, and Dylan Thomas.

McNally reopened the Tavern in 2009 as a "high-end revamp of a storied, nearly 100-year-old ... space."

== History ==
Minetta Tavern, named after the Minetta Brook, originally opened in 1937 by Eddie "Minetta" Sieveri.

It was also used as a speakeasy, hosting writers such as Joe Gould, who was rumored to receive his mail at the pub due to the frequency of his visits.

Keith McNally took over the restaurant in 2008 when it was owned by former busboy Taka Becovic and served family style Italian food. After Sieveri sold the Tavern to Becovic, he returned every year for his birthday dinner until his death. Becovic sold the restaurant when he could no longer pay the increased rent; Becovic did not disclose the exact amount, but it was speculated to be a minimum of $50,000/month. The restaurant closed in early May 2008, reopening in 2009 with a focus on French bistro food.

In December 2024, Minetta Tavern opened a second location in the Union Market district of Northeast Washington, D.C. This location is situated inside an old industrial building, as many other businesses in the neighborhood are.

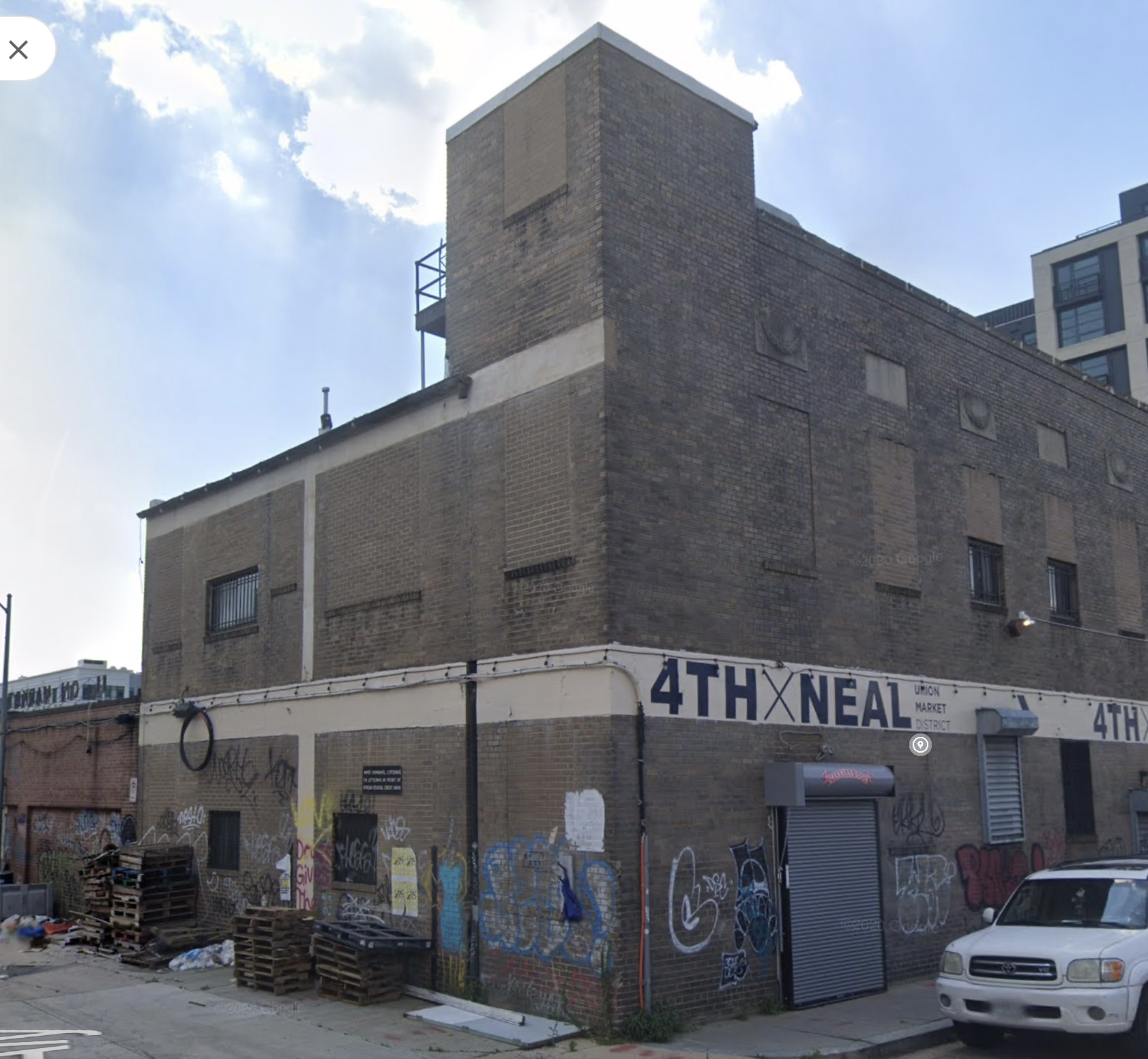
The industrial building in Washington, D.C., July 2019, later to house the second location of Minetta Tavern.

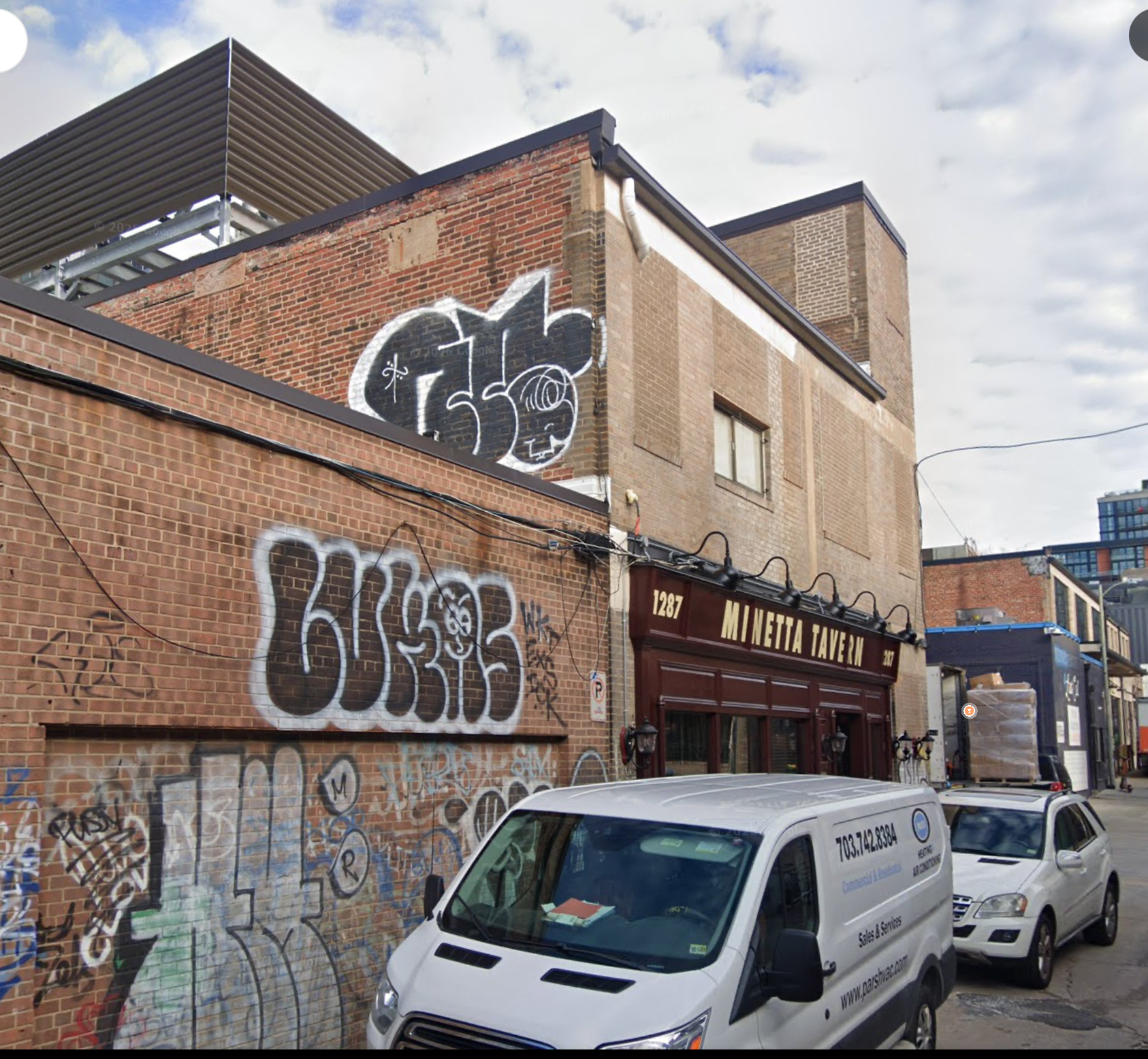
Minetta Tavern location in Washington, D.C.

== Ratings ==
Minetta Tavern received one Michelin star from 2010 until 2018.

== In popular culture ==
The Minetta Tavern is a featured location in the video game The Blackwell Convergence where the spirit medium Rosangela Blackwell learns about Joe Gould, who is connected to a case she is working on.
