= Phil McNally =

British animator

Phil Captain 3D McNally is a Northern Irish-born British-American animator best known for his work in 3-D film; in the 1990s, he legally changed his middle name to "Captain 3D". The BBC describes him as a "leading pioneer of 3D animation.".

A graduate of the Royal College of Art in London, McNally's first public presentation of his work was at SIGGRAPH 2000. He subsequently moved to the united states, where he joined Industrial Light and Magic; as an animator. While at Industrial Light & Magic he supervised the 3D conversion of Chicken Little before moving to Disney Animation as the supervising Stereographer. He was then hired by Jeffrey Katzenberg at DreamWorks Animation, where he was given the task of developing and building the DreamWorks Animation 3D pipeline. He left DreamWorks Animation to become the Global Stereographer at Rocket Science 3D.
