= Steve McNally (doctor) =

English physician

Steve McNally is a British medical doctor and the former Head of Sports Medicine and Science at Premier League football club Manchester United. In December 2023 he left and joined up the team of English PGMOL referees McNally joined the Liverpool F.C. Academy as their medical official in 1998. In 2002, he began working with the England youth international squads as well as at Liverpool.

In July 2006, McNally replaced Mike Stone as the senior club doctor at Manchester United. Stone had been at the club since 1999. McNally worked alongside the Head of Human Performance, Richard Hawkins, and was supported by a medical team including Lead First Team Physiotherapist Richard Merron and assistant first-team club doctor Tony Gill, as well as First Team Physiotherapist Jonathan Picot and First Team Rehabilitation Physiotherapist John Davin . He worked out of the Trafford Training Centre in Carrington, Greater Manchester, and in 2013 new multi-million-pound medical and sports science facilities were opened at the training centre. McNally received praise from former manager Sir Alex Ferguson and United players for his treatment of injuries at the club, including managing Rio Ferdinand's back problems and Darren Fletcher's illness.

McNally found himself at the centre of disputes between Manchester United and the England national football team over the treatment of injuries, and United being unhappy with the England set-up publicly releasing details of player injuries. His staff were also involved in a public argument over the treatment of injuries suffered by Owen Hargreaves, who appeared to criticise United's medical team after departing the club in 2011. United strongly backed their medical staff, and considered taking legal action against Hargreaves.
