= Brian McNally =

British-born restaurateur

Brian McNally is a British-born restaurateur. He opened various Manhattan restaurants, including The Odeon, Indochine, Canal Bar, and 150 Wooster in the 1980s. In 1989, Vanity Fair referred to McNally as the "undisputed King Midas of downtown eateries for nearly a decade."

== Life and career ==
McNally was born into a working-class family in Bethnal Green, London. After leaving school at the age of 16, he moved to Amsterdam and sold English-magazine subscriptions before returning to London and working as a busboy in Chelsea. In 1969, he left England to travel around the world and he settled in New York City in 1976, where his brother, Keith McNally, worked as a waiter at One Fifth in Greenwich Village.

In October 1980, he opened The Odeon, a bistro, in TriBeCa with his brother, Keith McNally. They created Odeon to compete with Elaine's "who didn't welcome the young writers, was too expensive, and didn't like women." 1988, Brian McNally sold his share of Odeon to his brother.

In 1982, McNally married Anne McNally, who he met through their mutual friend Anna Wintour. They later divorced.

In 1984, McNally and music producer John Loeffler transformed Lady Astor's into Indochine, a French-Vietnamese restaurant that they opened at 430 Lafayette St in NoHo, Manhattan. In the early 1990s, McNally couldn't pay the taxes on Indochine and the restaurant was closed. Indochine was re-opened by Huy Chi Le, who was a busboy at the restaurant.

In 1987, McNally and Jerry Joseph opened Jerry's at 101 Prince Street in SoHo, Manhattan. Due to financial issues, McNally sold his interest in Jerry's. Jerry's remained in operation until 2007.

McNally turned Munson Diner into Canal Bar, which served American food. The Canal Bar opened in 1987 and was located at 511 Greenwich St in the Hudson Square neighborhood of Manhattan.

In 1989, he opened 150 Wooster at a former garage in SoHo. The short-lived restaurant was closed in 1991 and McNally was sued by several investors.

In 1989, McNally purchased the bistro Man Ray at 169 Eighth Avenue in Chelsea, Manhattan. He reopened Man Ray as a French-American restaurant in 1990.

In 1991, McNally opened 44 at the Royalton Hotel. He signed over the lease to the hotel’s owner, Ian Schrager, in 2000.

In 1995, McNally and singer Madonna opened the Blue Door at Delano in Miami Beach, Florida. He later sold his interests to Ian Schrager.

He was a partner in the Bryant Park Hotel in New York and the Shore Club in Miami Beach before pulling out of both.

McNally relocated to Vietnam in 2008. In 2012, he opened the Italian restaurant Lucca in District 1, Ho Chi Minh City.
