= James McNally (American football) =

American football player and coach

Playing career
- 1890–1891: Fordham

Coaching career (HC unless noted)
- 1890: Fordham

Head coaching record
- Overall: 5–3–2

James McNally was an American college football player and coach. He was the head football coach at Fordham University for one season in 1890, compiling a record of 5–3–2.

== Head coaching record ==
Year	Team	Overall	Conference	Standing	Bowl/playoffs
Fordham (Independent) (1890)
1890	Fordham	5–3–2			
Fordham:		5–3–2			
Total:		5–3–2			
