= Nally =

Nally is a surname. Notable people with the surname include:

- Derek Nally (born 1936), Irish politician; unsuccessful candidate for president in 1997
- Donald Nally (born 1960), American conductor and opera chorus master
- Edward Julian Nally (1859–1953), American radio businessman; first president of RCA
- Edward Nally (solicitor) (born 1956), English solicitor and academic
- Eric Sean Nally, American rock singer
- Padraig Nally, Irish farmer; convicted then exonerated of manslaughter
- Pat Nally (1857–1897), Irish republican and sportsman
- Patrick Nally (born 1947), British sports marketing businessman
- Will Nally (1914–1965), British politician, MP from Wolverhampton
