= John J. McNally (businessman) =

American businessman (1928–2018)

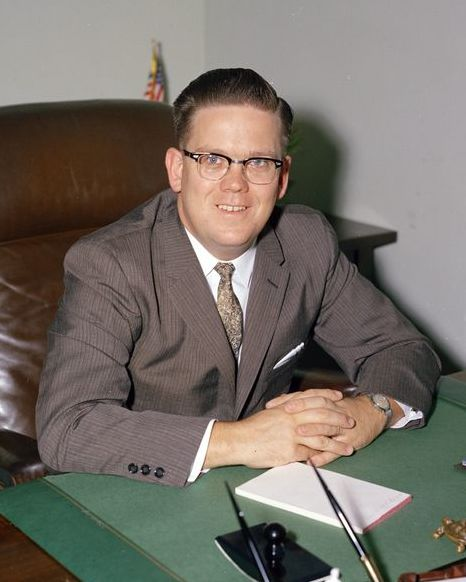
- McNally in 1961
- Born: John J. McNally Jr. 1928; Worcester, Massachusetts, US
- Died: November 21, 2018 (aged 89–90)
- Education: Northeastern University; Becker College
- Occupation: Businessman

John "Jack" J. McNally Jr. (1928 – November 21, 2018) was an American businessman who worked as the Staff Assistant for Congressional Liaisons during the Presidency of John F. Kennedy.

== Biography ==
McNally was born in 1928, in Worcester, Massachusetts. He attended Saint John's High School, later attending Northeastern University and Becker College. He served in the United States Army during World War II, and later became president of Webster Enterprises, a heating supplies company.

As the director of the Young Democrats of Worcester County, McNally began working for John F. Kennedy during the 1956 Democratic National Convention. He served as the Staff Assistant for Congressional Liaisons, and planned international trips. He also oversaw the State funeral of John F. Kennedy, and left the White House in 1965.

He retired from politics in 1990 and moved to Hilton Head Island, South Carolina. He married Irene M. McNally, who died in 2002. He died on November 21, 2018, aged 89 or 90.
