= James M. McNally =

American politician (born 1934)

Member of the Iowa Senate from the 39th district
- In office January 11, 1965 – January 8, 1967 Serving with Vincent S. Burke

Personal details
- Born: October 23, 1934 (age 91) Sioux City, Iowa, U.S.
- Party: Democratic
- Parent(s): John Edward McNally; Mary Loretta McNally
- Education: University of South Dakota (LLB)
- Profession: Politician, lawyer

James M. McNally (born October 23, 1934) is an American politician and lawyer.

McNally was born in Sioux City, Iowa, to John Edward and Mary Loretta McNally on October 23, 1934. He earned a bachelor of laws degree from the University of South Dakota, and operated a private legal practice in his hometown. Between January 1962 and January 1964, McNally was an assistant United States district attorney. He was subsequently elected to the Iowa Senate, and held the District 39 seat alongside fellow Democrat Vincent S. Burke from January 11, 1965, to January 8, 1967.
