= Keith McNally =

British restaurateur

- Born: 1951 (age 74–75); Bethnal Green, London, England
- Occupation: Restaurateur
- Children: 5
- Relatives: Brian McNally (brother); Sasha Spielberg (daughter-in-law)

Keith McNally (born 1951) is a British-born New York City restaurateur. McNally is or has been the owner of several establishments, including the Parisian-style brasserie Balthazar and, formerly, Nell's nightclub.

== Early life ==
McNally was born in 1951 in London, England. He grew up in the working-class East End neighborhood of Bethnal Green, where his father worked as a dockworker and his mother was a self-educated homemaker. McNally left school at age 16 and initially pursued acting. In the late 1960s, he landed a role in playwright Alan Bennett’s West End production Forty Years On, and Bennett became both a mentor and later McNally’s romantic partner.

In 1975, McNally moved to New York City, where he took entry-level restaurant jobs. He quickly rose to floor manager.

== Career ==
=== Restaurants ===
McNally has been active in New York City since the 1980s. In that time, he has opened multiple restaurants including Augustine, Balthazar, Cafe Luxembourg, Cherche Midi, Lucky Strike, Minetta Tavern, Morandi, Nell's, The Odeon, Pastis, Pravda, Pulino's, and Schiller's. Frank Bruni awarded three stars to Minetta Tavern in 2009. The New York Times has called him "The Restaurateur Who Invented Downtown."

In October 2022, McNally banned James Corden from entering his restaurants after Corden had behaved rudely toward a server after receiving an improperly prepared order. Corden later privately apologized to McNally and McNally's staff, after which McNally removed the ban. Subsequently, Corden also publicly apologized to both McNally and the staff on his late night show.

In 2025, McNally published a memoir titled I Regret Almost Everything.

=== Acting ===
McNally was a member of the original London cast of Alan Bennett's play Forty Years On in 1968, playing the part of Macilwaine.

== Personal life ==
McNally married Lynn Wagenknecht in the early 1980s, after meeting her while working in the restaurant industry in New York City. The couple had three children together, including actress Isabelle McNally. They divorced in 1994.

Wagenknecht later retained ownership of several early ventures co-founded with McNally, including The Odeon and Café Luxembourg. McNally later remarried and had two additional children, including George McNally, also a restaurateur. His brother, Brian McNally, is also a restaurateur in New York.

=== Instagram ===
McNally has been described as "cantankerous" on Instagram.

In May 2021, McNally faced controversy on Instagram after posting that Ghislaine Maxwell "must be given a fair trial".
