= Anthony Kelly =

Anthony Kelly may refer to:

- Anthony Kelly (lacrosse) (born 1980), professional lacrosse player with the Los Angeles Riptide
- Anthony Paul Kelly (1897–1932), American screenwriter
- Anthony Kelly (academic), professor of education at the University of Southampton
- Anthony Kelly (martial artist) (born 1964), grandmaster martial artist and world record holder
- Champ Kelly, American football executive
- Anthony Kelly (materials scientist) (1929–2014) British materials scientist

== See also ==
- Tony Kelly (disambiguation)
- Anthony-Noel Kelly (born 1956), British artist
