= Drag Syndrome =

British drag performance collective

Drag Syndrome is a British drag performance collective composed of drag queens and drag kings with Down syndrome. The collective was founded in London in 2018 by choreographer and artistic director Daniel Vais and developed from his work with performers with Down syndrome through Culture Device Dance Project.

The group's performances combine drag, dance, lip-sync, costume, movement, humour and audience interaction. Since its formation, Drag Syndrome has performed in the United Kingdom and internationally at queer nightlife venues, festivals, Pride events and cultural institutions. Appearances have included Glastonbury Festival, RuPaul's DragCon UK, Berghain in Berlin, Somerset House in London and the Münchner Kammerspiele in Munich.

The collective has received media attention for its relationship to disability, sexuality, gender, artistic autonomy and queer culture. It has been profiled by outlets including Dazed, British Vogue, The Guardian, The Standard, PAPER, Gay Times, PinkNews, Vice and ITV News.

== History ==
=== Formation and first performances ===
Drag Syndrome developed from Culture Device Dance Project, an artistic company founded by Daniel Vais involving dancers and performers with Down syndrome.

According to accounts published by Vice and Dazed, the idea developed after Vais attended an event with actor and dancer Sarah Gordy where they saw drag performers. Gordy expressed an interest in experimenting with drag, and Vais subsequently discussed the idea with other artists from Culture Device. The performers began researching drag and developing their own stage identities.

Drag Syndrome gave its first public performance on 29 March 2018 at vFd, formerly Vogue Fabrics, an LGBTQ+ performance space in east London. Vice reported that the sold-out performance featured six artists. Following the response to the first event, the project developed into an ongoing performance collective.

A second event, Drag Syndrome 0.2, was held at Vogue Fabrics on 31 May 2018.

ITV News profiled the collective in June 2018, including performer Otto Baxter, whose drag persona is Horrora Shebang.

The collective subsequently became part of London's queer nightlife and performance scene and appeared at London Pride, the Royal Vauxhall Tavern and other queer cultural events.

Later in 2018 the collective performed at Alternative Miss World at Shakespeare's Globe.

PAPER published a feature on the group during its first year. Vais described the performers researching drag and developing individual characters rather than treating drag solely as costume.

=== International expansion ===
During 2019 Drag Syndrome increased its activity outside London and the United Kingdom.

ITV News Wales covered members of the collective during a performance in Cardiff in June 2019.

The collective also appeared at Montréal Pride in Canada. By November 2019, Dazed described Drag Syndrome as being on an international tour following performances in Britain and continental Europe.

The Dazed feature profiled Vais and performers including Horrora Shebang, Justin Bond and Gaia Callas and discussed the development of their individual drag identities.

The collective subsequently continued touring internationally, appearing at Pride events, theatres, festivals, clubs and cultural institutions.

=== Michigan discrimination dispute ===
In 2019, Drag Syndrome was scheduled to perform in Grand Rapids, Michigan, as part of a disability drag event organised by DisArt.

Peter Meijer, owner of the Tanglefoot Building where the performance was scheduled to take place, prevented Drag Syndrome from performing at the venue. Meijer said he had concerns about whether the artists were able to give "full and informed consent" to participate in drag.

DisArt and the American Civil Liberties Union of Michigan challenged the decision, and the ACLU filed a formal discrimination complaint.

Members of Drag Syndrome publicly rejected the suggestion that they were incapable of deciding whether they wished to perform drag.

The dispute generated international coverage and discussion about autonomy, sexuality and the rights of people with intellectual disabilities.

=== DragCon and British Vogue ===
In January 2020, Drag Syndrome performed at the inaugural RuPaul's DragCon UK in London.

Filmmaker Jess Kohl followed members of the collective during the event for a short documentary titled Drag Syndrome, commissioned by British Vogue for its 2020 Pride film series.

The film followed the performers preparing for and performing at DragCon UK and explored their individuality, gender expression and artistic practice.

Kohl said that one aim of the film was to move away from patronising responses towards people with intellectual disabilities and instead present members of the collective as complex artists exercising their own agency.

The film was released by British Vogue on 23 June 2020.

The film later appeared at Fashion Film Festival Milano, where Kohl received the Best Director award.

=== 2021–2023 ===
Following the disruption to live performance caused by the COVID-19 pandemic, Drag Syndrome returned to live performances and international touring.

By 2022, a frequently presented line-up included Lady Mercury, Nikita Gold, Davina Starr, Justin Bond, Lady Francesca and Horrora Shebang.

In May 2022, Drag Syndrome appeared at the Mittenmang International Theatre Festival in Bremen, Germany. The programme listed Lady Mercury, Nikita Gold, Davina Starr, Justin Bond and Jonny Medals among the performers.

In August 2022 the collective staged a day-long programme at Somerset House in London as part of This Bright Land. The programme featured Nikita Gold, Lady Mercury, Justin Bond, Lady Francesca, Horrora Shebang and Davina Starr and combined drag performances with talks, music and guest appearances.

Drag Syndrome returned to RuPaul's DragCon UK in January 2023. The Guardian documented the collective as part of a photographic feature on the event.

In June 2023 Drag Syndrome performed at Glastonbury Festival, appearing in the Shangri-La programme.

=== 2024–present ===
In January 2024, Drag Syndrome performed as part of the All Abled Arts programme at the Münchner Kammerspiele in Germany.

The collective returned to the theatre in June 2024 for That's Drag! Extravaganza, alongside German guest performers including Rocky Black, Pinay Colada, Earl van Grey, KingTenu and Victoria Hell.

Rocky Black, a Germany-based drag king, appeared with Drag Syndrome as a guest artist in connection with this German activity.

On 18 June 2024, Drag Syndrome performed at the opening of Krake Festival at Berghain in Berlin.

In July 2024, The Guardian published a photographic feature about the collective featuring Nikita Gold, YouGo Boss, Justin Bond, Lady Francesca, Sheeza Bet, Davina Starr and Lady Mercury. The performers discussed their experiences of drag, performance and disability in their own words.

In 2025, the Barbican Centre in London hosted a screening of Saskia Boddeke's film Inside My Heart followed by a ScreenTalk featuring Drag Syndrome performers Annalie Huberman-Hertz (YouGo Boss) and Francis Majekodunmi (Lady Francesca) with Vais.

During 2025, Drag Syndrome announced that it would stop accepting new UK bookings, citing difficulties obtaining sufficient financial and institutional support for disabled artists.

In March 2026, The Guardian reported that Drag Syndrome had joined UnMute, a live music roster established to improve professional opportunities for disabled musicians and performers. The collaboration enabled the collective to resume taking UK bookings.

Annalie Huberman-Hertz, who performs as YouGo Boss, was quoted in the article discussing professional opportunities for disabled artists.

== Artistic practice ==
Drag Syndrome's artists perform through individual drag personas developed according to their own interests, performance styles and identities.

Performances typically incorporate dance, movement, lip-sync, costume, make-up, music, comedy and audience interaction.

Early reporting on the collective emphasised that the performers researched drag and developed individual characters rather than being assigned identities by the artistic director.

In the 2019 Dazed profile, members discussed their individual approaches to drag. Horrora Shebang described a performance identity influenced by horror and darker aesthetics, while Gaia Callas discussed costume, glamour and transformation.

Justin Bond, the drag king persona of Ruby Codiroli, has described Drag Syndrome as a professional artistic group. In a 2020 feature with The Standard, Codiroli discussed the importance of being treated with professional respect rather than being viewed primarily through disability.

The collective's work has frequently been discussed in relation to the autonomy and sexuality of people with intellectual disabilities. Media coverage has addressed assumptions that disabled adults should be separated from queer culture, sexuality or forms of performance associated with provocation and self-expression.

The collective's approach places emphasis on performers controlling their own stage identities and artistic personas.

== Performers ==
Drag Syndrome has operated with a changing ensemble since its formation in 2018. Artists perform under individual drag personas, and different combinations of performers have appeared in different shows, tours and periods of the collective's history.

Artists documented as having performed with Drag Syndrome include:

Horrora Shebang — Otto Baxter Justin Bond — Ruby Codiroli Lady Francesca — Francis Majekodunmi Gaia Callas — Danny Smith Frozita Honkong — Sam Barnard George the Lord Gymma Black Nikita Gold — Nick McKerrow Lady Mercury — Adam Wild Davina Starr — Davis Simpson Jonny Medals — Holly Riseborough YouGo Boss — Annalie Huberman-Hertz Sheeza Bet Lady Felicia Rocky Black — Germany-based guest artist

The official Drag Syndrome artist archive documents a number of the collective's early and long-standing performers.

Horrora Shebang, Justin Bond and Gaia Callas were profiled by Dazed during the collective's early period of international touring.

The 2022 Mittenmang International Theatre Festival identified Lady Francesca as Francis Majekodunmi, Lady Mercury as Adam Wild, Nikita Gold as Nick McKerrow, Davina Starr as Davis Simpson, Justin Bond as Ruby Codiroli and Jonny Medals as Holly Riseborough.

The Barbican Centre identifies Francis Majekodunmi as Lady Francesca and Annalie Huberman-Hertz as YouGo Boss.

YouGo Boss, Sheeza Bet, Nikita Gold, Justin Bond, Lady Francesca, Davina Starr and Lady Mercury were documented in The Guardian in 2024.

Lady Felicia has also been publicly documented as a Drag Syndrome performer in research on disability and performance.

Rocky Black appeared with Drag Syndrome in Germany as a guest artist and is included in the historical performer list while retaining that distinction.

The ensemble has changed over time, and inclusion in the historical list does not necessarily indicate current permanent membership.

== Selected performances ==
Selected appearances by Drag Syndrome include:

Vogue Fabrics / vFd, London — first performance, 29 March 2018 London Pride — 2018 Alternative Miss World, Shakespeare's Globe — 2018 Oslo, Norway — 2018 Royal Albert Hall, London — 2019 Montréal Pride — 2019 RuPaul's DragCon UK — 2020 Mittenmang International Theatre Festival, Bremen — 2022 Paris Pride — 2022 Somerset House, London — This Bright Land, 2022 WHOLE Festival, Germany — 2022 RuPaul's DragCon UK — 2023 Glastonbury Festival — 2023 Münchner Kammerspiele, Munich — 2024 Krake Festival at Berghain, Berlin — 2024

== Media and publications ==
Drag Syndrome has been the subject of coverage in newspapers, magazines, fashion publications, LGBTQ+ media, television and documentary film.

One of the earliest television reports about the collective was broadcast by ITV News in June 2018.

In September 2018, PinkNews published a profile of Otto Baxter and his drag persona Horrora Shebang, discussing his experiences performing with Drag Syndrome.

Vice published a substantial feature about the collective in December 2018, documenting its formation, first performance and early artistic development.

In January 2019, LGBTQ Nation published a feature on Drag Syndrome and its growing international activity.

In June 2019, Gay Times published a dedicated feature about the collective.

Later that year, Dazed published an extensive feature by Tom Rasmussen examining Drag Syndrome's origins, international touring and the individual drag personas of its performers.

Drag Syndrome also appeared in Attitude. Reporting on the 2019 Michigan discrimination dispute noted that the collective had previously appeared as one of the publication's cover subjects during its anniversary series.

In 2020, photographer Eimear Lynch photographed the collective for Dazed, with styling by Sophie Cochevelou and make-up by Jack Oliver.

The same year, Drag Syndrome appeared in King Kong Garçon, a publication associated with King Kong Magazine. The editorial was created by Berlin-based Contemporary Ct Collective and featured Gymma Black, George the Lord, Frozita Honkong, Gaia Callas, Lady Francesca, Justin Bond and Horrora Shebang.

In March 2020, The Standard published a profile of Justin Bond focusing on Drag Syndrome, professional performance and stereotypes surrounding Down syndrome.

In June 2020, British Vogue released Jess Kohl's short documentary Drag Syndrome as part of its Pride film series.

The documentary subsequently received recognition at Fashion Film Festival Milano.

In 2022, Drag Syndrome was the subject of a fashion editorial in DSECTION Magazine, photographed by Cameron McNee.

The Guardian documented Drag Syndrome at RuPaul's DragCon UK in a photographic essay in January 2023.

In July 2024, The Guardian published a dedicated photographic feature about Drag Syndrome. The feature presented a number of the performers discussing their work, identities and experiences in their own words.

In 2025, Drag Syndrome appeared in Novembre Magazine Issue 17 in an editorial photographed by Jules Moskovtchenko and styled by Patricia Villirillo. The editorial featured Davina Starr, Lady Francesca, Nikita Gold, Justin Bond, YouGo Boss and Daniel Vais.

Drag Syndrome was also featured as a cover subject for Issue 17 of Novembre Magazine.

Other publications and media outlets that have covered Drag Syndrome include NBC News and a range of LGBTQ+, arts, fashion and disability publications.

== Books and academic publications ==
Drag Syndrome has been featured in books concerning drag and LGBTQ+ culture and has been discussed in academic writing on contemporary drag and disability performance.

In 2020, Drag Syndrome was featured on page 34 of Dan Jones's 50 Drag Queens Who Changed the World: A Celebration of the Most Influential Drag Artists of All Time, published by Hardie Grant.

The inclusion placed Drag Syndrome among drag performers selected by Jones for their influence on the development and visibility of the art form.

In 2021, Drag Syndrome was featured in Dom&Ink's Queer Power: Icons, Activists & Game Changers from Across the Rainbow, published by HarperCollins.

The collective is also discussed in Mark Edward and Stephen Farrier's edited academic volume Contemporary Drag Practices and Performers: Drag in a Changing Scene, Volume 1. The book examines Drag Syndrome and Horrora Shebang within a wider discussion of contemporary drag practice and the expansion of drag beyond conventional assumptions about who participates in the form.

The volume discusses Drag Syndrome's participation in Andrew Logan's 2018 Alternative Miss World at Shakespeare's Globe and considers the collective in relation to disability, queer visibility and contemporary performance practice.

== Reception and cultural impact ==
Coverage of Drag Syndrome has frequently focused on the relationship between assumptions about intellectual disability and the performers' artistic and personal autonomy.

Early reporting by Vice documented the performers' involvement in researching and constructing their own drag personas.

Dazed described Drag Syndrome in 2019 as a professional drag collective of drag kings and queens with Down syndrome and examined how the performers developed distinct artistic identities.

In British Vogue, filmmaker Jess Kohl argued against reducing the performers to sentimental or patronising representations of disability. Her film instead focused on their personalities, sexuality, gender expression and professional practice.

The 2019 Michigan controversy brought particular attention to questions of consent and autonomy. The ACLU of Michigan challenged the decision to prevent the performers from appearing on the basis of assumptions about their intellectual disabilities.

In the 2024 Guardian feature, members of the group discussed performing as a form of self-expression, professional ambition and cultural participation.

The collective has also been discussed within broader debates about employment and professional opportunities for disabled artists. In 2026, The Guardian reported on Drag Syndrome's involvement with the UnMute roster and barriers the collective had encountered in securing sustainable UK bookings and support.

== See also ==
- Drag king
- Drag queen
- Drag (entertainment)
- Disability in the arts
- Down syndrome
- LGBTQ culture in London
