= Ruby (talk show) =

British late-night talk show

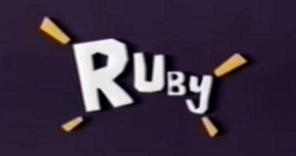
- Series 4 Title Card
- Genre: Talk show
- Directed by: Ed Bye; Peter Orton; Southan Morris
- Presented by: Ruby Wax
- Theme music composer: Simon Brint
- Country of origin: United Kingdom
- Original language: English
- No. of seasons: 4
- No. of episodes: 48

Production
- Executive producer: Clive Tulloh
- Production location: BBC Television Centre
- Camera setup: Multi-camera
- Running time: 40 min
- Production company: BBC Television

Original release
- Network: BBC Two
- Release: 12 May 1997 – 9 November 2000

Ruby was a late-night talk show broadcast on BBC Two in the United Kingdom.

The series premiered on 12 May 1997, and was hosted by writer and comedian Ruby Wax. In each episode Wax holds an unscripted roundtable discussion with up to five guests. Framed as a dinner party, guests included actors, writers, stand-up comedians, musicians, journalists and other well-known figures in the entertainment industry.

A total of 48 episodes were broadcast between May 1997 and November 2000.

== Production ==
Wax with guests Salman Rushdie and Carrie Fisher

Each episode was recorded at BBC Television Centre. All episodes were pre-recorded, and often with no time limit. The conversation between Wax and her guests would sometimes last up to three hours, and would later be edited down to 40 minutes for broadcast. Multiple episodes could be recorded on the same day. The set was dressed as a restaurant and bar, and guests would eat, drink and smoke as if at a dinner-party. To add to the restaurant atmosphere, additional tables were populated by BBC staff including producers, secretaries, cafeteria and office workers.

== Notable guests and episodes ==
Actress and writer Carrie Fisher appeared regularly on the series. Fisher and Wax had become close friends since first meeting on Wax's earlier series, The Full Wax. Fisher appeared in a total 7 episodes of the series.

According to his 2004 autobiography, talk show host Graham Norton first met Fisher when they both appeared as guests on the same episode, and also became good friends with her.

Actor and comedian Scott Thompson appeared during the series' third season, and spoke at length about witnessing the 1975 Brampton Centennial Secondary School shooting.

Actor Alan Cumming also appeared during the series' third season, and spoke at length of his experience of being stalked by obsessive fans while he was performing in the 1998 Broadway revival of Cabaret.

== Reception ==
In reviewing the first three episodes, columnist Jasper Rees wrote in The Independent:

Ruby (BBC2, Mon to Wed) doesn't feel fully thought through: you get the impression it's an experimental stop-gap. But - hats off - it doesn't skimp on ambition. Uniting guests round a dining table with no particular axe to grind or product to promote, the challenge accepted by Ruby is to keep the conversational ball up in the air without the support system of topicality, and without the flabby or ill-disciplined as an equivalent show on radio could get away with.

== Episodes ==
=== Series overview ===
Series	Episodes	Originally released	
Series	Episodes	First released	Last released
1	12	12 May 1997	4 June 1997
2	12	6 July 1998	29 July 1998
3	12	13 September 1999	6 October 1999
4	12	23 October 2000	9 November 2000

=== Season 1 (1997) ===
The first season of 12 episodes was broadcast thrice-weekly, usually on Monday-Wednesday nights, in May and June 1997.

No. overall	No. in series	Guests	Original release date
1	1	Leo Bassi, Raoul Heertje, Eddie Izzard, Terry Jones and Babben Larsson	12 May 1997
2	2	Eve Arnold and John Simpson	13 May 1997
3	3	Marianne Faithfull, Lucinda Lambton and Will Self	14 May 1997
4	4	Carrie Fisher and Salman Rushdie	19 May 1997
5	5	Carrie Fisher, Joanna Bowen, Helen Lederer, Kathy Lette and Bernadette Moran-Ferreira	20 May 1997
6	6	Carrie Fisher, John Lahr and Hugh Laurie	21 May 1997
7	7	Frances Barber and Meera Syal	27 May 1997
8	8	Frances Barber and Meera Syal	28 May 1997
9	9	Jeremy Hardy, Jonathan Miller and Muriel Spark	29 May 1997
10	10	John Diamond, Carmen Callil and Helena Kennedy	2 June 1997
11	11	Rupert Everett, Jill Robinson, Fiona Shaw and Martin Sherman	3 June 1997
12	12	Alan Davies, Anna Massey and Glenys Kinnock	4 June 1997

=== Season 2 (1998) ===
A second season of 12 episodes was broadcast thrice-weekly on Monday-Wednesday nights in July 1998.

No. overall	No. in series	Guests	Original release date
13	1	Jeanne Moreau, Joanna Lumley and Boy George	6 July 1998
14	2	Frances Barber, Michelle Collins and Gerald Ratner	7 July 1998
15	3	Rhona Cameron, Brigitte Nielsen and Joe Simpson	8 July 1998
16	4	Edwina Currie, Helen Lederer and Tony Slattery	13 July 1998
17	5	Dominick Dunne and Clive James	14 July 1998
18	6	Carrie Fisher, Dominick Dunne and Clive James	15 July 1998
19	7	Carrie Fisher, Julian Lennon and John Diamond	20 July 1998
20	8	Ivana Trump, Dana International and Julian Clary	21 July 1998
21	9	Richard Wilson, PD James and Elizabeth Wurtzel	22 July 1998
22	10	Bruce Robinson, Joanna Bowen and Ian Ross	27 July 1998
23	11	Neil Simon, Anna Massey and Josephine Hart	28 July 1998
24	12	Bret Easton Ellis, Carrie Fisher and Elizabeth Wurtzel	29 July 1998

=== Season 3 (1999) ===
A third season of 12 episodes was broadcast thrice-weekly on Monday-Wednesday nights in September and October 1999.

No. overall	No. in series	Guests	Original release date
25	1	Terry Gilliam and Eddie Izzard	13 September 1999
26	2	Anthony-Noel Kelly, Carrie Fisher, Graham Norton and Griff Rhys Jones	14 September 1999
27	3	Frances Barber and Graham Norton	15 September 1999
28	4	John Lloyd, Joanna Lumley and Sarah Miles	20 September 1999
29	5	Billy Crystal	21 September 1999
30	6	Robert Bly, Marion Woodman, John Simpson and Tony Slattery	22 September 1999
31	7	Glenda Jackson, Helena Kennedy, John Diamond and Patrick Kielty	27 September 1999
32	8	Marianne Faithfull, John Brown, Nicky Haslam and Anita Pallenberg	28 September 1999
33	9	Scott Thompson, Rhona Cameron and Robert McLiam Wilson	29 September 1999
34	10	Malcolm McDowell and Edward Hibbert	4 October 1999
35	11	Malcolm McDowell, Edward Hibbert, Lindsay Duncan, Scott Thompson and Karen Moline	5 October 1999
36	12	Olympia Dukakis, Martin Sherman and Alan Cumming	6 October 1999

=== Season 4 (2000) ===
A fourth and final season of 12 episodes was broadcast on Monday-Thursday nights in October and November 2000.

No. overall	No. in series	Guests	Original release date
37	1	Roseanne Barr	23 October 2000
38	2	Jerry Hall, Graham Norton and Georgina Beyer	24 October 2000
39	3	Siân Phillips, Amanda Donohoe and David Sedaris	25 October 2000
40	4	Lucie Arnaz, Alexis Arquette and Suzanne Bertish	26 October 2000
41	5	Jackie Collins, Rich Hall and Helen Lederer	30 October 2000
42	6	Roseanne Barr, David Baddiel and Lynda La Plante	31 October 2000
43	7	John Diamond, Matthew Manning, Beechy Colclough and Jonathan Harvey	1 November 2000
44	8	Jay McInerney, Kate O'Toole, and David Sedaris	2 November 2000
45	9	Ewan McGregor and Eddie Izzard	6 November 2000
46	10	Michael Gambon, James Fleet and Kevin McNally	7 November 2000
47	11	Anthea Turner, Will Carling, Clarissa Dickson Wright and Johnny Scott	8 November 2000
48	12	Robert Winston, Phil Hammond and Muriel Gray	9 November 2000
