= Frank Moraes =

Indian newspaper editor (1907–1974)

- Born: Francis Robert Moraes; 12 November 1907; Bombay, British India
- Died: 2 May 1974 (aged 66); London, England
- Occupations: Newspaper editor, writer
- Spouse: Beryl Moraes (m. 1937)
- Partner: Marilyn Silverstone (1960s–1974)
- Children: Dom Moraes (son)
- Relatives: Teresa Albuquerque (sister)

Francis Robert "Frank" Moraes (12 November 1907 – 2 May 1974) was an editor of many prominent newspapers in post-independence India, including The Times of India and The Indian Express.

== Early life and education ==
Born in Bombay (now Mumbai) of Goan descent on 12 November 1907, Moraes was the son of Anthony Xavier Moraes, a Goan civil engineer. He spent his childhood in the city of Poona, British India, and studied at Catholic schools in both cities. The historian Teresa Albuquerque was his sister.

From 1923, Moraes was at St Xavier's College where he studied history under Henry Heras and also economics. He earned his B.A. at Bombay University majoring in history and economics. He went to Oxford for his M.A. in history" He was active in Oxford University student politics, and edited the student newspaper Bharat. He also studied law at Lincoln's Inn in London, and was called to the Bar. In all, he spent seven years in England from 1927 to 1934.

In 1937, Moraes married Beryl Anna Bonosa. The couple had a son named Dom, who went on to become the famous poet Dom Moraes. Beryl suffered from mental illness in the 1940s and was confined to hospitals and mental asylums.

== Career ==
Returning to India in 1934, he practiced as a barrister for a few months, and in 1936 joined The Times of India as a journalist, was promoted to junior assistant editor in 1938, and worked in Burma and China as the war correspondent for The Times between 1942 and 1945.

Between 1946 and 1949, Moraes was based in Ceylon (now Sri Lanka) as editor of The Times Ceylon and The Morning Standard. He worked as the India correspondent of several British newspapers, and in 1950 became The Times of India's first "Indian editor", amidst a changing post-colonial situation.

On returning from Ceylon in 1949, Frank Moraes was named editor of The National Standard, a Goenka-owned Indian newspaper that later morphed into The Indian Express. According to another journalist of Goan origin, Victor Rangel-Ribeiro, "[A]t that time I was on the news copy desk as well as being the music critic, and remember him as an individual who kept himself aloof, quite unlike other editors I have worked with. Six days a week he wrote the main editorial and a column he signed as 'Atticus'". Moraes left within months to be the editor at the Times of India.

Ribeiro recalls that in January 1953, while at Calcutta on the job of Sunday editor at their soon-to-be-started edition in that city in eastern India, Moraes visited the edition. He recalls, "Well after midnight I was down in the pressroom okaying pages as they were being "made up" on the 'stone'---those were the days of metal type and printers' ink—and in rolled Frank Moraes at the head of his cohort, and he had just a one-line mantra for me: "Let's get the paper out! Let's get the paper out!" Having said that, he kept out of our way. Others in the group, however, were more obtrusive, and soon we had to hustle them back upstairs.".

In 1957, The Indian Express (formerly the Morning Standard) named him as the editor-in-chief of this Goenka-run newspaper. Becoming one of India's best-known journalists his columns appeared regularly on Sundays and Mondays in the Indian Express, while another column signed as "Ariel" made its mark in the Sunday Standard. He did some radio broadcasts. In 1961 he was appointed Sheriff of Bombay.

== Retirement and death ==
Frank Moraes retired from The Indian Express in 1972, moved to London as its representative the next year, and died in 1974. His last days were spent in the company of Marilyn Rita Silverstone with whom he had been in a relationship for more than a decade.

== Moraes' books ==
Moraes authored India Today, The Revolt in Tibet (1960), Report on Mao's China, Yonder one world : a study of Asia and the West, The importance of being black: an Asian looks at Africa (1965) and Behind the Bamboo Curtain.

Other books listed here include Introduction to India (1945. co-authored with H L Stimson), Report on Mao's China (1953); Jawaharlal Nehru: A Biography (1956); Sir Purshotamdas Thakurdas (1957); Yonder One World: A Study of Asia and the West (1957); India Today (1960); Nehru, Sunlight and Shadow (1964); John Kenneth Galbraith Introduces India (1974, co-edited); and his political autobiography, Witness to an Era: India 1920 to the Present Day (1973).

== Author, celebrated journalist, editor ==
In obituaries to his son, the poet and writer Dom Moraes, Frank Moraes was called an "author ... sometime editor of the Times of India", and "an Oxford-educated lawyer who was to become a celebrated journalist and Editor of The Times of India".

== Archives ==
Frank Moraes' archives are held in London by SOAS Special Collections and consist of "notebooks and diaries; correspondence; newspaper clippings and typescripts of Moraes' regular columns, articles and tour articles; reviews of Moraes' books; photographs; drawings, illustrations and programmes; recorded broadcasts; papers of (his wife) Beryl Moraes' objects".

His archives include papers covering mainly the 1930s–1974 period, and are useful considering that he worked as a journalist, author and editor during a crucial period in the history of India and a then just-being-decolonised Asia – particularly between 1950 and 1974.

It also contains his notebooks and diaries, dating from 1950 to 1974, from Australia and New Zealand, South East Asia, China, Japan, Pakistan, India, Africa, Western and Eastern Europe and the USA. Listings of his archives say it includes correspondence, professional and personal matters, newspaper clippings, regular columns and archives, reviews of the books he published, photographs from 1930s to 1970s, recorded broadcasts and the diary of his wife, Beryl, dating to 1962.

== Frank Moraes Foundation ==
This news item in The Hindu newspaper mentions a memorial lectures in honour of Frank Moraes. It cites a "Frank Moraes Foundation" being among the institutions taking the initiative in this regard. The United Writer's Association of India "is responsible for having instituted the distinguished FRANK MORAES MEMORIAL LECTURES to perpetuate the hallowed memory of distinguished Journalist FRANK MORAES – the doyen of Indian Journalism who was responsible for having extended the realm of journalism to socio-political dimensions of development, for fearless comments on the highest in the land and for a broader vision of India. (...) The UWA has eminently succeeded in organizing three decades of public lectures in our country."

EducationWorldOnline.net says the Frank Moraes Foundation was set up by demographer, social worker, academician and philosopher Dr. K. Thyagarajan "in 1985 and instituted the Frank Moraes Memorial Lecture in 2002". It adds that Thyagaraj was an "ardent admirer and disciple of the late Indian Express editor Frank Moraes, the doyen of Indian journalism."

== See also ==
- Marilyn Silverstone
