= Victor Rangel =

Victor Rangel may refer to:

- Victor Rangel-Ribeiro (born 1925), Indian writer and journalist
- Víctor Rangel (Mexican footballer) (born 1957), Mexican football manager and forward
- Victor Rangel (Brazilian footballer) (born 1990), Brazilian football forward
