= Jude Moraes =

English landscape gardener

- Born: Judith Anne St John; 30 December 1943; Northamptonshire
- Died: 4 January 1993 (aged 49); London
- Resting place: Highgate Cemetery
- Occupation: Landscape Gardener

Jude Moraes (30 December 1943 – 4 January 1993) was a British landscape gardener, writer and broadcaster based in London.

== Personal life ==
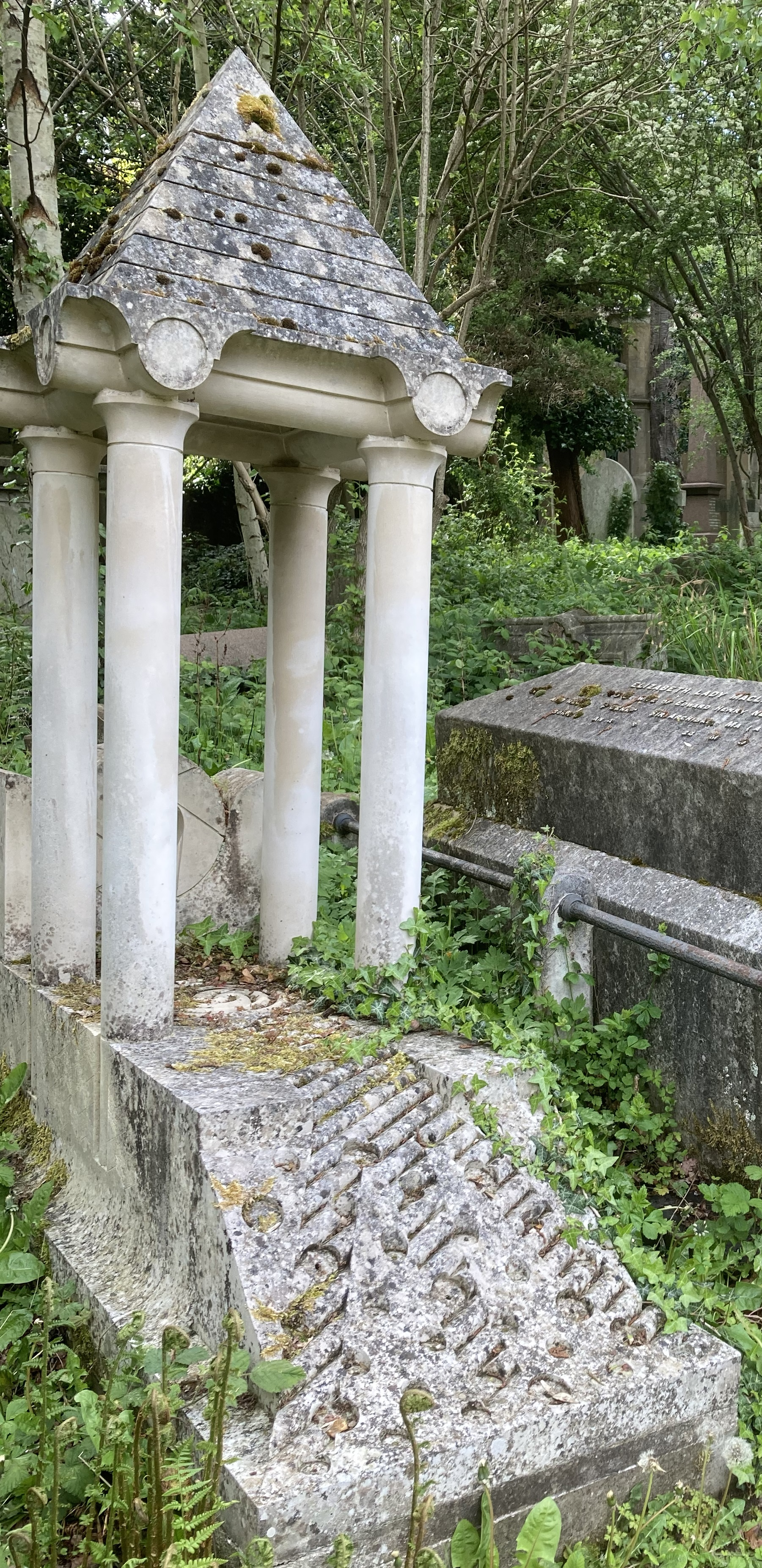
Grave of Jude Moraes in Highgate Cemetery

Judith Anne St John (Jude Moraes) was born on 30 December 1943, the only daughter of Wing Commander J R St John and his wife, Pat Whiting. She grew up on her maternal grandfather's farm, The Lodge Castlethorpe, Buckinghamshire. and initially trained as an actress at the London Academy of Music and Dramatic Art (LAMDA) where in 1961, in a Chelsea pub she met the Indian poet Dom Moraes, who later wrote about their life together in his autobiography My Father's Son. In the mid 1960's they moved to the Basses-Alpes region of France, living a frugal existence. In 1966 their son, Heffalump Francis Ramsay Moraes, was born. The family travelled to Nepal, Afghanistan, Bhutan and the remote Kingdom of Sikkim, where Jude fell ill and was treated by the court physician and vet. In 1969, Jude left Dom Maraes and returned to London, settling in De Beauvoir Square, Hackney.

== Career ==
Jude was well into her 30's when she decided to pursue a career in gardening, enrolling in a two year course at Oaklands Horticultural College, St Albans, obtaining a national diploma in 1979. Her first gardening job was with the Royal Parks, after which she set up independently as Jude the Gardener, partnering with Carol Laws, and finding clients by advertising in the Hampstead and Highgate Express. She became known for her superb plantsmanship and distinctive designs which reflected the personalities of her clients and the architectural settings of their gardens. She also designed rustic garden furniture and summer houses, influenced by the mid-Victorian garden writer Shirley Hibberd. Her team of twelve became her friends, taking spontaneous excursions to Sissinghurst and other notable English gardens and in 1985 she formed a new partnership with the town planner Larry Hansen.

In 1986 she became gardening correspondent for the woman's magazine Prima and began to broadcast on Woman's Hour. In 1978 she founded the De Beauvoir Gardeners' Club which held annual flower and produce shows in the vicarage garden. For the Club she organised expert lectures and visits to foreign gardens in France, Holland and Ireland. The Club brought together the area's established working class residents and the new middle class arrivals, a model which Hansen and Jude, with her strong social conscience, were anxious to repeat in other poor London districts, though most of their schemes foundered due to bureaucracy, political correctness and a lack of funding.

== Later life ==
She had a wide circle of friends and her free spirit was exemplified by her regular competition in the jewellery designer Andrew Logan's original Alternative Miss World Contest.

She married Lawrence Hansen at the Danish Church in Regent's Park in August 1992, just a few months before her death on the 4 January 1993. She is buried on the western side of Highgate Cemetery near the Circle of Lebanon.
