= Tony Kelly =

Tony Kelly may refer to:

- Tony Kelly (politician) (born 1948), Australian politician
- Tony Kelly (photographer) (born 1975), Irish photographer
- Tony Kelly (footballer, born 1964), English soccer player who played for Wigan Athletic, Stoke City, West Bromwich Albion, Bolton Wanderers, etc.
- Tony Kelly (footballer, born 1966), English soccer player with Nigerian descent who played for Stoke City, Bury, Leyton Orient, etc.
- Tony Kelly (Australian footballer) (born 1963), Australian rules footballer for Collingwood
- Tony Kelly (hurler) (born 1993), Irish hurler for Clare and Ballyea
- Tony Kelly (basketball) (1919–1987), American basketball player

== See also ==
- Anthony Kelly (disambiguation)
