= Andrey Bartenev =

Russian artist

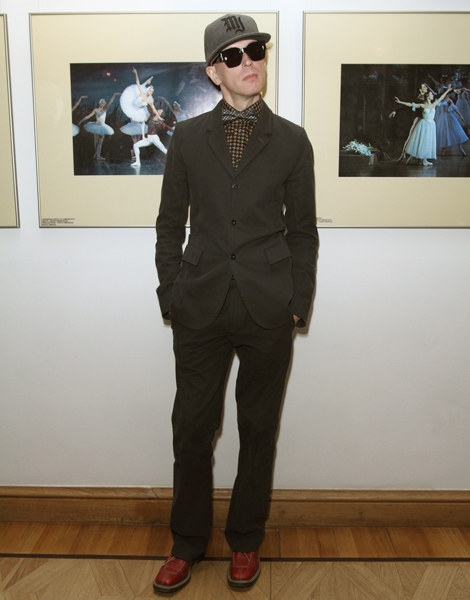
Andrey Bartenev in 2013

Andrey Bartenev (Russian: Андрей Бартенев) is a Russian artist, sculptor, experimentalist, and creator of many provocative, interactive installations and performances. He was born October 9, 1965 in Norilsk, Russia.

== Ideology ==
He operates in an interdisciplinary field. "Art for me is a single current," he has said, "and I don't care what forms it takes." Examples are his papier-mâché "eight-legged dog for high-speed transportation;" his performance "Black Caviar Road" – a line of Russians black caviar cans with car tires rolling by; and his sound installation "Say: I love you" which uses a computer to transform those three words into an echo bouncing through two hundred speakers.

== Career ==
At the crest of Russia's wave of radical Sots Art, Bartenev was invited to bring his performances all over Europe: (Germany), Switzerland, Poland, Lithuania, Latvia, Norway, Austria, and France. Bartenev's synthetic performance The Snow Queen (1993), a vivid avant-garde interpretation of Andersen's fairy tale, traveled to London's Victoria & Albert Museum Theater and Royal Festival Hall (SBC).

Bartenev has created costumes for theater plays: The Blue Bird by Maurice Maeterlinck in New York, Elizaveta Bam by Daniil Kharms in Moscow, Cinderella by Sir Peter Maxwell Davies in Hamburg. He was an editor and published two books: People in Paints, an anthology of Russian body art, and Marvelous! – Russian Illustrators of the Glamorous Life, a history of Russian magazine illustration from 90-s. A main priority for him was a series of LED-sculptures: London Under Snow, Electric Aliens, Skriabin’s Light Music and Connection Lost – field of lonely hearts. The latter was exhibited in the Russian Pavilion at the Venice Biennial in 2007 and became a big hit in London at Riflemaker Contemporary Art Gallery. Bartenev created a design of LED-watches for the fashion company Armand Basi. Bartenev made raw of performances for Robert Wilson’s Watermill Center in US: The Ladder of Red (2002), Caution! Cats and Dogs on the Road (2005), Emily likes the TV (2006) and Animals Competition (2007) with Dita von Teese.

In 2008 Bartenev's works were displayed in the American Visionary Art Museum in Baltimore, and he showed the performance Shaking Angles at The National Arts Club on Gramercy Park in New York City.

In 2009 among other activities he organized and curated The Third International Festival of Illustration (Moscow), created performance SunPool for Willem de Kooning Foundation (USA), did multiple acclaimed workshops at an international summer academy at Domaine de Boisbuchet (Centre Georges Pompidou, the Centre International de Recherche et d´Education Culturelle et Agricole (CIRECA), and Vitra Design Museum, France) and different workshops at The Norwegian Theatre Academy in Norway. He also participated at MIDI_E Festival (performance – Babbles of Hope, Spain).

In 2012 Bartenev made the design for the exhibition of treasures in The Royal Library, Denmark.

== Awards ==
In 2018, Bartenev won the Alternative Miss World as Miss UFO.

== Other references ==
- Unicycleproductionsllc.com
- Urbanstages.org
- Via3pr.com
- Rtimesr.com
- "New York Times". The New York Times.
- New York Times
- Andrewlogan.com
