= Teresa Albuquerque =

Indian historian (1930–2017)

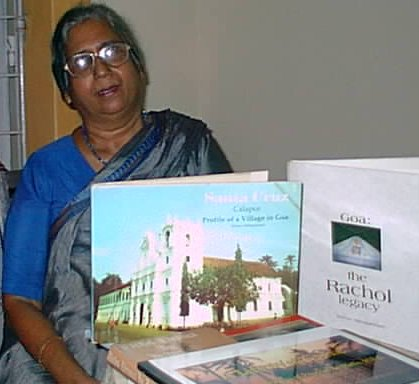
- Albuquerque in 2006
- Born: Teresa Moraes; 1930; Poona, British India
- Died: 12 June 2017 (aged 86–87); Mumbai, Maharashtra, India
- Education: St. Xavier's College, Bombay (B.A.); University of Mumbai (M.A., Ph.D)
- Occupation: Historian
- Spouse: Matthew Albuquerque
- Relatives: Frank Moraes (brother); Dom Moraes (nephew)

Teresa Albuquerque (née Moraes; 1930 – June 2017) was an Indian historian who specialised in the Goan diaspora and the colonial history of Bombay.

== Early and personal life ==
Teresa Moraes was born in Poona, Bombay Presidency, in 1930, in a notable Goan family. Her brother was journalist Frank Moraes. She obtained a BA Honours degree in English and French from St Xavier's College, Bombay, which she followed up with an MA and Ph.D. in history from the University of Bombay. She married Matthew Albuquerque.

== Career ==
Albuquerque started as a teacher of English and History at high school. Following a stint on a panel that reviewed history books, she took up post-graduate studies in history. She then joined the Heras Institute of Indian History and Culture as a researcher.

On the encouragement of John Correia-Afonso, a director of the institute, she began to investigate the history of Goa. From this research came several books and articles, in particular Anjuna: Profile of a Village in Goa, which was her husband's native village, as well as Goa: The Rachol Legacy, on the four hundred years of a Jesuit seminary in Goa. Her interest in colonial art and architecture resulted in the publication of Under the Archangel's Wings: 400 years of St.Michael’s Church, Anjuna.

With a scholarship from the Heras Institute, she studied the Goan diaspora, publishing a book Goans in Kenya. Until the 1960s, east Africa had been a major centre of Goan migration. This book became an important source book for succeeding researchers.

Albuquerque published several works on the colonial history of India, especially on the intersection of Portuguese and British rules. Following the 1878 treaty between Britain and Portugal, the Goan economy became subject to British control. Commodities flowed into British India while the Portuguese raised taxes in Goa to compensate for the loss of revenue. A newly built railway line connecting Goa to British India then became a conduit for impoverished economic migrants heading to Bombay. Albuquerque's book on Goan emigres to British India, Goan Pioneers in Bombay (2011) covered their story; a paper The Anglo-Portuguese Treaty of 1878: Its impact on the people of Goa (1990) discussed the broader impact of the treaty on Goan lives.

A popular career taken up by Goans was of music-making, either joining street bands or orchestras in Bombay. Albuquerque reported that there was so much demand for Goan musicians that one entrepreneur named Francisco Menezes sought unemployed men to march in processions, inflating their cheeks without blowing a note. Another career was of bakery, with many such establishments appearing in Bandra, a neighbourhood of Mumbai. According to Albuquerque, this was an early settlement for Goan migrants, from the 1920s. Their skill of making bread translated into a nickname the Goans were given by the other residents of the city - Pao, from the Portuguese word pão for bread.

Another of her works was on the contributions of Christians to the Indian independence movement, The Role of Christians in the National Struggle for Freedom (2006).

== Death ==
Albuquerque died in June 2017 in Mumbai, aged 87.

== Works ==
=== Books ===
- Albuquerque, Teresa (1985). Urbs prima in Indis: an epoch in the history of Bombay, 1840-1865. Promilla.
- Albuquerque, Teresa (1986). To love is to serve: Catholics of Bombay. Heras Institute of Indian History and Culture.
- Albuquerque, Teresa (1988). Anjuna: Profile of a Village in Goa. Promilla. ISBN 978-8185002064.
- Albuquerque, Teresa (1989). Santa Cruz, Calapor: Profile of a Village in Goa. Fernandes Publication.
- Albuquerque, Teresa (1992). Bombay, a history. Rashna.
- Albuquerque, Teresa (1997). Goa: The Rachol Legacy. Wenden Offset. ISBN 978-8190073004.
- Albuquerque, Teresa (2000). Goans of Kenya. Michael Lobo.
- Albuquerque, Teresa (2004). Bassein, the Portuguese interlude. Wenden Offset.
- Albuquerque, Teresa (2011). Goans Pioneers in Bombay. Goa,1556. ISBN 978-9380739236.
- Albuquerque, Teresa (2017). The Portuguese Impress: Glimpses of the Portuguese Possessions of Goa, Bombay and Bassein. Margao: CinnamonTeal Design and Publishing. ISBN 978-93-86301-52-9.

=== Articles ===
- Albuquerque, Teresa (1983). "Christian Impact on Nineteenth Century Bombay". Indica. 20 (2).
- Albuquerque, Teresa (1990). "The Anglo-Portuguese Treaty of 1878: Its impact on the people of Goa". Indica. 27 (2).
- Albuquerque, Teresa (2000). "Liberation and the Goan Ethos". In Borges, Charles J.; Pereira, Oscar G.; Stubbe, Hannes (eds.). Goa and Portugal: History and Development. Concept.
- Albuquerque, Teresa (2006). "The Role of Christians in the National Struggle for Freedom". In Engineer, Asghar Ali (ed.). They Too Fought for India's Freedom: The Role of Minorities. Hope India.
