= Doodeward v Spence =

Court case about legality of possession of human remains

- Court: High Court of Australia
- Full case name: Doodeward v Spence
- Decided: 31 July 1908
- Citations: [1904] HCA 1, (1904) 1 CLR 91., [1908] HCA 45

Court membership
- Judges sitting: Griffith CJ, Barton & H. B. Higgins

Case opinions
- If a person has by the lawful exercise of work or skill so dealt with a dead human body that it has acquired attributes differentiating it from a mere corpse awaiting burial, he acquires a right to retain possession of it and, if deprived of possession, may maintain an action for its recovery against any person not entitled to have it for the purpose of burial.

Doodeward v Spence is a 1908 Australian high court case regarding legal possession of human remains. It gave rise to the "work or skill" exception to the usual common law principle that a human body cannot be owned.

== Background ==
Mr. Doodeward had exhibited a two-headed stillborn fetus, preserved in paraffin oil, at a fairground. The fetus had been obtained from a Dr. Donahoe, who originally sold it to Doodeward's father. Spence, a policeman, arrested Doodeward for outrage to public decency, and seized the jar and its contents. When Spence refused to return it, Doodeward brought a claim in detinue seeking its return.

== Opinion ==
After noting the usual common law position that nobody owns a body, Griffith J. announced a new rule that exercising "work or skill" to preserve the body would grant a person greater rights of possession than the usual limited right to possess a body for the purpose of burial. Griffith J said "it does not follow from the mere fact that a human body at death is not the subject of ownership that it is forever incapable of having an owner." He said that "when a person has by the lawful exercise of work or skill so dealt with a human body or part of a human body in his lawful possession that it has acquired some attributes differentiating it from a mere corpse awaiting burial, he acquires a right to retain possession of it, at least as against any person not entitled to have it delivered to him for the purpose of burial, but subject, of course, to any positive law which forbids its retention under the particular circumstances."

== Justice Higgins' dissent ==
Justice Higgins dissented. He would have applied the then-settled rule that there could be no property in human remains. Higgins argued that there was no conflict with permitting the holdings of mummies by museums since Egypt was not British soil, where common law would apply, and where the requirement of Christian burial did not apply.

== Legacy ==
The case has been cited in the UK and in Australia, and is recognized as playing an important role in the development of principles under which a person can acquire property rights in a human body. It was one of the bases for R v Kelly and Lindsay, a criminal case involving the theft of already-dissected human tissue specimens by an artist, and has relevance to the determination of rights over frozen embryos for in vitro fertilisation. The phrase "material which is the subject of property because of an application of human skill" was adopted in the UK's Human Tissue Act 2004 to allow for commercial dealings in relation to appropriate human material.
