= The Waiting Game (game show) =

- Genre: Game show
- Created by: Amanda Wilson
- Presented by: Ruby Wax
- Country of origin: United Kingdom
- Original language: English
- No. of series: 2
- No. of episodes: 18

Production
- Running time: 45 minutes
- Production company: Hat Trick Productions

Original release
- Network: BBC One
- Release: 17 November 2001 – 15 June 2002

The Waiting Game is a Saturday night game show that aired on BBC One from 17 November 2001 to 15 June 2002, with Ruby Wax as host.

== Gameplay ==
=== Round 1 ===
Three teams of two start the game, with one player from each team at the buzzers and their teammates standing behind them. Wax asks a total of eight questions during this round. Once she finishes reading each question, a 10-second timer starts; the point value is determined by how long the players wait to buzz in. Values start at 1 point, then increase to 3, 5, 8, 12, and finally 15 points just before time expires. The timer is not shown to the teams, and the question value is only announced once a player buzzes in. That player's teammate must answer the question without conferring; a correct answer awards the points to that team, while a miss awards them to both opposing teams. For the last three questions, a miss automatically scores 15 points for the opposing teams regardless of the current question value.

After all eight questions have been asked, the team with the lowest score is eliminated. If, on the last question, the team in third place buzzes in so early that they cannot catch up, they are immediately eliminated without being permitted to answer. The round can end early if one team falls so far behind that they cannot at least tie for second place even by scoring all remaining points.

If two teams tie for second place, another question is given to them without the timer. The first team to hit their buzzer gets to respond; a right answer qualifies them, while a wrong answer eliminates them and allows their opponents to advance.

=== Round 2 ===
The two remaining teams' scores are reset to zero. Gameplay is the same as round 1, except that the partners switch places, and only six questions are available. The team in the lead at the end of this round, or the winning team of the tiebreaker (if applicable), moves on to the bonus round.

=== Bonus Round ===
Standing on opposite sides of a tall partition, the winning teammates try to answer a series of questions within 60 seconds, timed to 1/100 of a second. The timer begins to run only after Wax finishes reading each question, and stops when a player presses their buzzer or after 10 seconds have elapsed. The first player to buzz in must answer for themselves, without conferring. Question values increase each second as follows:

£10
£50
£100
£200
£500
£1,000
£1,500
£2,000
£3,000
£5,000

As in the main game, the teammates are not shown the timer nor each other, and the question value is only revealed once a player buzzes in; in addition, the remaining time is announced before each new question. An incorrect answer, pass, or failure to register after 10 seconds awards no money and wastes the time used on that question. If the team correctly answers six questions before time runs out, they win whatever money they have accumulated; otherwise, they forfeit all of their winnings and leave with nothing. The maximum possible winnings total is £30,000.

== Transmissions ==
Series	Start date	End date	Episodes
1	17 November 2001	5 January 2002	8
2	6 April 2002 (Note: Series 2 was originally scheduled to start on 30 March 2002, but was postponed due to news coverage of the death of Queen Elizabeth the Queen Mother.)	15 June 2002	10
