= Marilyn Silverstone =

English photojournalist and Buddhist nun

Marilyn Rita Silverstone (9 March 1929 – 28 September 1999) was an English photojournalist and ordained Buddhist nun.

== Youth ==
The eldest daughter of Murray and Dorothy Silverstone was born in London. Her father, the son of Polish immigrants to America, rose to become managing director, and president, international, respectively, of United Artists and 20th-Century Fox, working with Charlie Chaplin and other early film stars in London. The family returned to America just before the outbreak of the Second World War in Europe.

Silverstone grew up in Scarsdale, New York. After graduating from Wellesley College, she became an associate editor for Art News, Industrial Design and Interiors in the early 1950s. She moved to Italy to make documentary art films.

== Photojournalist ==
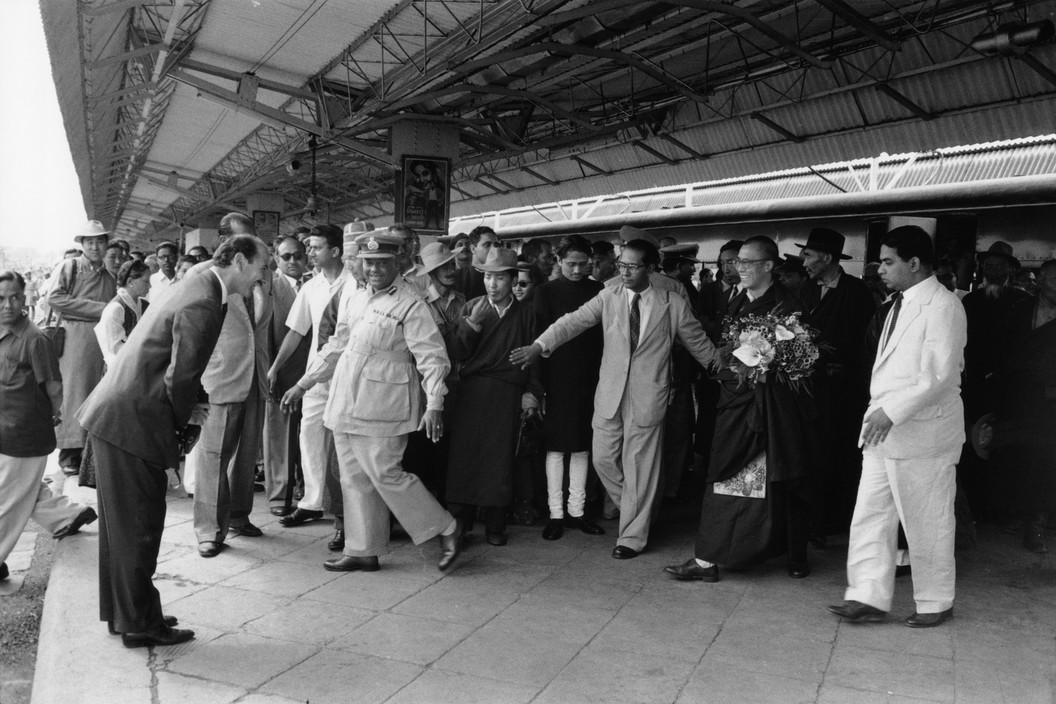
1959 photograph of the arrival of the Dalai Lama at Siliguri by Silverstone

Silverstone became a working photojournalist in 1955, traveling and capturing the range of images that her vision led her to find in Europe, Africa and the Middle East.

In 1956, she travelled to India on assignment to photograph Ravi Shankar. She returned to the subcontinent in 1959; what was intended to be a short trip became the beginning of a fascination with India which lasted for the rest of her life. Her photographs of the arrival in India of the Dalai Lama, who was escaping from the Chinese invasion of Tibet, made the lead in Life.

In that period, she met and fell in love with the journalist Frank Moraes. Moraes was then editor of The Indian Express. The couple lived together in New Delhi until 1973, socializing with politicians, journalists and intellectuals, and diplomats. A number of Moraes' editorials had earned the ire of Prime Minister Indira Gandhi and the situation deteriorated to the point that a retreat to London became the best course.

Over the years, Silverstone's reputation as a photographer grew. In 1967, she joined Magnum Photos, in which she was only one of five women members. Silverstone's work for Magnum included photographing subjects ranging from Albert Schweitzer to the coronation of the Shah of Iran.

At the time of Silverstone's death, preparation of an exhibition at the Scottish National Portrait Gallery featuring her work and that of other Magnum photographers was nearing completion. the University of St Andrews hosted a seminar in conjunction with this exhibition, and as Silverstone had just recently died, the seminar became an opportunity for her peers to celebrate her life and career.

== Buddhist nun ==
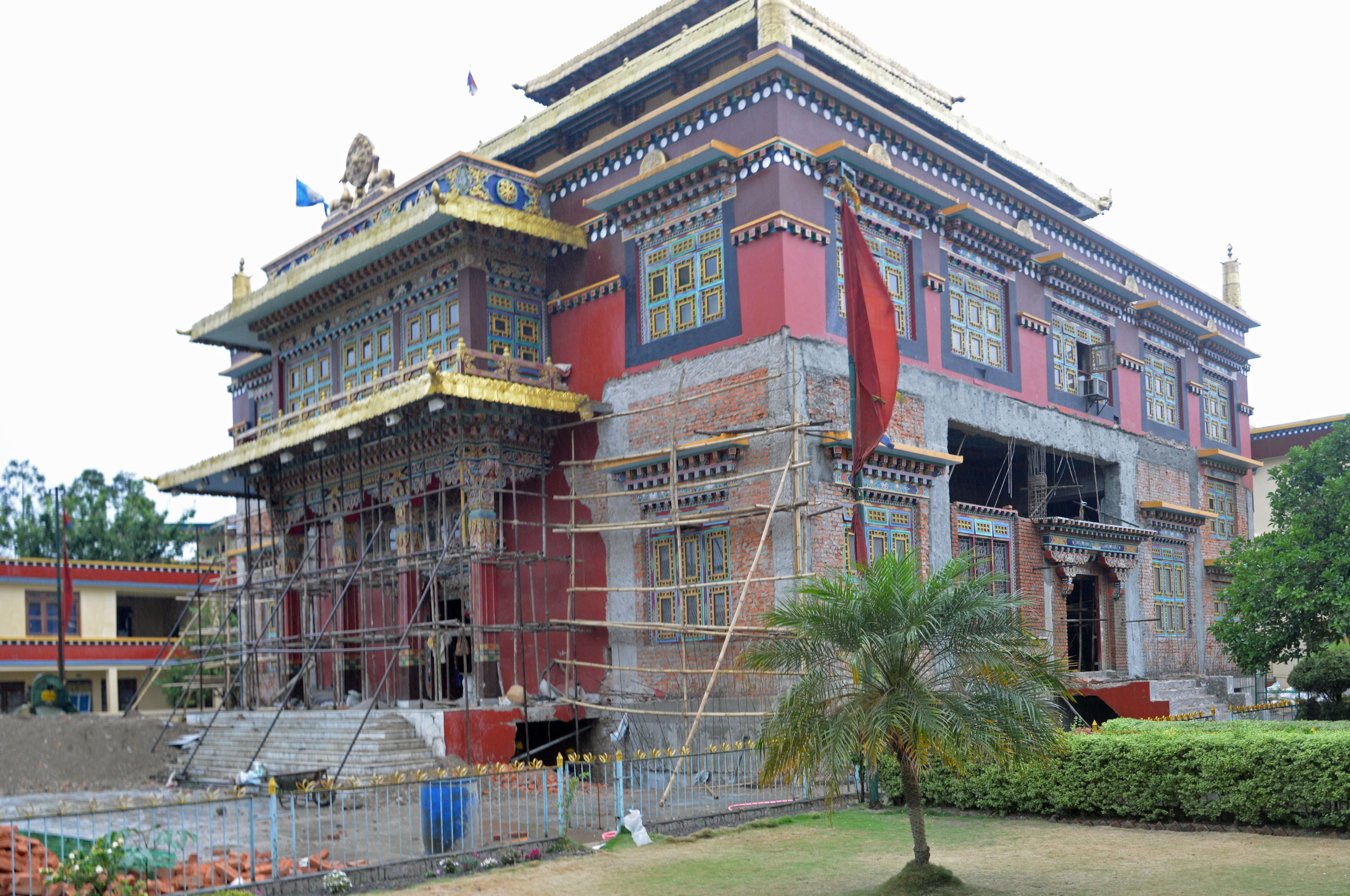
Shechen Monastery in 2016

Silverstone's conversion to Buddhist nun was said to have begun when she was a teenager suffering from the mumps. She later explained that during this conventional childhood illness, she read Secret Tibet by Fosco Maraini and she said the book provided a key she long carried in her subconscious.

In the late 1960s, Silverstone had worked on a photography assignment about a Tibetan Buddhist lama in Sikkim named Khanpo Rinpoche and, when the lama came to London for medical treatment in the 1970s, Rinpoche stayed with the couple. At this point, Silverstone decided to learn Tibetan in order to study Buddhism with him. After Moraes's death in 1974, Silverstone decided to join the entourage of another celebrated lama, Khentse Rinpoche, who left London for a remote monastery in Nepal.

In 1977, she took vows as a Buddhist nun. Her Buddhist name was Bhikshuni Ngawang Chödrön, or Ani Marilyn to her close friends. In her new life in Kathmandu, she researched the vanishing customs of Rajasthan and the Himalayan kingdoms.

In 1999, Ngawang Chödrön returned to the United States for cancer treatment and she learned that she was terminally ill. She was clear that she wanted to die in Nepal, her home for the past 25 years. However, no airline would carry a passenger in her fragile condition. She resolved the impasse by persuading a doctor on vacation to accompany her on the return to Kathmandu. The journey was fraught with difficulties. She was barely conscious during the trip and a stopover was necessary in Vienna. She died in 1999 in a Buddhist monastery near Katmandu where she had worked to establish and maintain.

== Selected works ==
=== Books by Silverstone ===
- Gurkhas And Ghosts: The Story Of A Boy In Nepal. London: Methuen Publishing, 1964. [reprinted by Criterion Books, New York, 1970. ISBN 0-316-92875-5.]
- Bala: Child of India. New York: Hastings House, 1968. ISBN 0-8038-0670-1.
- Ocean of Life: Visions of India and the Himalayan Kingdoms. New York: Aperture Foundation, 1985. ISBN 0-89381-195-5.

=== Books with contributions by Silverstone ===
- Miller, Luree. (1987). The Black Hat Dances: Two Buddhist Boys in the Himalayas (photography by Marilyn Silverstone). New York: Dodd, Mead and Company. ISBN 0-396-08835-X (cloth)
