= Alternative Miss World =

Art and fashion event

The Alternative Miss World is an art and fashion event presented in the form of a beauty pageant. It was founded by Andrew Logan in 1972, and has been held irregularly since, with the 16th competition held in 2026. Alternative Miss World has been described as a "pansexual beauty pageant" where the "bizarre is beautiful", and it has attracted figures from the world of art, fashion and entertainment, including David Hockney, Derek Jarman, Zandra Rhodes, Vivienne Westwood, Brian Eno, and Grayson Perry. It is the subject of the documentary films The British Guide to Showing Off and The Alternative Miss World.

== Format ==
The competition follows the format used by Miss World whereby the contestants are required to wear three separate sets of costumes – daywear, swimwear and evening wear. A panel of judges determines the winner based on the poise, personality and originality of the contestants. Judges have included Jarvis Cocker, Tim Curry, Billy Connolly, Brian Eno, Zandra Rhodes, David Bailey, Brian Clarke, Ossie Clark, Fenella Fielding, Richard O'Brien, Molly Parkin, Anita Roddick, Zoe Wanamaker, Nick Rhodes, and Sir Norman Rosenthal.

All the events were hosted by Logan, dressed half as a woman and half as a man. Many of the female halves of his costume were designed by Zandra Rhodes. Logan may be accompanied by co-hosts, such as Divine, Grayson Perry, Julian Clary and Ruby Wax, and assisted by a "secretary". Notable participants include Derek Jarman who won in 1975 as Miss Crêpe Suzette, John Maybury as Miss Windscale Nuclear Power Station, Leigh Bowery as Miss Fuck It, and Grayson Perry as Miss St Claire Perry of Essex, dressed as Jesus on the Cross.

== History ==
The first Alternative Miss World was held on 25 March 1972 in the studio of Andrew Logan in Downham Road, Hackney which was a converted jigsaw factory. The event was inspired by a visit to the Crufts dog show, and the contestants in the competition would be judged on the same criteria as the dogs at Crufts: poise, personality and originality. The first event was attended by David Hockney and Robert Medley who were in the judges panel. The second was also held in Logan's studio, with Angie Bowie appearing as one of the judges (it was claimed that David Bowie could not get in due to overcrowding at the place). Other attendees included Jude Moraes and the cast of The Rocky Horror Show. Starting that year, the winner received crown jewels designed by Logan. The third outing of the competition was held in Logan's new studio in Butler's Wharf, and a theme, "Wild", was introduced this year. The event was attended by Malcolm McLaren and Vivienne Westwood where one of the contestants, Gaby Longhi, competed in ripped-up clothes with safety pins that would later become a feature of the punk style.

The 1978 Alternative Miss World, with Divine as co-host, was filmed by Richard Gayer. The resulting documentary film, titled The Alternative Miss World, was shown at the Cannes Film Festival in 1980. The Miss World organisation attempted to block the film's showing at the Odeon in Leicester Square on the same night as the Miss World contest, but the case was dismissed by Lord Denning. The Alternative Miss World organization was represented by the future Prime Minister Tony Blair.

The following Alternative Miss World in 1981 was the largest yet organised and it was held at the Grand Hall of Olympia in West Kensington, London. The scale of this event left Logan with a debt of £25,000, but he was helped by donations, including a painting from David Hockney. This event was later broadcast on Channel 4. In 1986, Logan intended to use Chislehurst Caves in south east London as a venue, however, protests from the locals concerned about AIDS forced its relocation at short notice to Brixton Academy.

Although the competition is open to both men and women, it was only in 1986 that the first woman won – Jenny Runacre as Miss National Geographic. The previous year's competition was won by a robot created by Bruce Lacey, Miss ROSA BOSOM (Radio Operated Simulated Actress Battery or Standby Operated Mains), which was first designed for a theatre production in 1966. The 1998 Alternative Miss World was won by 75-year-old Russian woman, Miss Pani Bronya, who became its oldest winner. There has been a significant Russian presence since 1995, and the 2018 competition was won by the Russian performance artist Andrey Bartenev as Miss UFO. After decades of entering the Alternative Miss World since its debut, Logan's adopted sister Janet Slee (as Miss Golden Girl) won for the first time in 2022, the contest's fiftieth anniversary.

== Events ==
Andrew Logan is the host and hostess of Alternative Miss World.

Date	Location	Theme	Co-hosts	Winner	Ref.
25 March 1972	Andrew Logan's studio, Hackney	—N/a		Patrick Steed (Miss Yorkshire)	
13 October 1973	Andrew Logan's studio, Hackney	—N/a		Eric Roberts (Miss Holland Park Walk)	
22 March 1975	Logan's studio, Butler's Wharf	Wild	Molly Parkin	Derek Jarman (Miss Crêpe Suzette)	
20 October 1978	Clapham Common	Circus	Divine, Molly Parkin	Stevie Hughes (Miss Carriage)	
2 October 1981	Olympia Kensington	Royal Imperial	Molly Parkin	Michael Haynes (Miss Aldershot)	
31 May 1985	Brixton Academy	Water	Janet Street-Porter, Simon Callow	Miss ROSA BOSOM. (a robot by Bruce Lacey)	
13 October 1986	Brixton Academy	Earth		Jenny Runacre (Miss National Geographic)	
6 May 1991	Business Design Centre, Islington	Air	Rula Lenska	Burnel Penhaul (Miss Gale Force Wind)	
1995	The Grand, Clapham Junction	Fire	Richard O'Brien	Molly Burnel (Mademoiselle Jean d'Arc)	
12 December 1998	291 Gallery, Hackney	The Void		Miss Pani Bronua	
22 October 2004	Hippodrome, London	The Universe	Julian Clary, Matthew Glamorre	Miss Secret Sounds of Sunbird Rising, CCCP	
2 May 2009	Round House, Camden	The Elements	Ruby Wax	Veronica Thompson (Miss Fancy Chance)	
18 October 2014	Shakespeare's Globe Theatre	Neon numbers	Grayson Perry	Sasha Frolova (as Miss Zero +)	
20 October 2018	Shakespeare's Globe Theatre	Psychedelic peace	Sara Kestelman	Andrey Bartenev (Miss UFO)	
28 October 2022	Shakespeare's Globe Theatre	Gold	Jarvis Cocker	Janet Slee (Miss Golden Girl)	
13 September 2026	Regent's Park Open Air Theatre	Gaia	Eve Ferret	Miss Fiontasia	

== See also ==
- Alternative Miss Ireland
