= Dom Moraes =

Indian writer and poet (1938–2004)

- Born: Dominic Francis Moraes; 19 July 1938; Bombay, British India
- Died: 2 June 2004 (aged 65); Bandra, Mumbai, India
- Citizenship: British
- Education: Jesus College, Oxford
- Occupations: Writer; poet
- Spouse(s): Henrietta Moraes (m. 1961) Judith Moraes (divorced) Leela Naidu (m. 1969; sep. 1992)
- Partner: Sarayu Srivatsa (1991–2004)
- Children: 1
- Relatives: Frank Moraes (father); Teresa Albuquerque (aunt)
- Writing career
- Language: English
- Notable works: A Beginning (1958); Poems (1960); John Nobody (1965); My Son's Father (1968); Serendip (1990)
- Notable awards: Hawthornden Prize (1958); Sahitya Akademi Award for English (1994)

Dominic Francis "Dom" Moraes (19 July 1938 – 2 June 2004) was an Indian writer and poet who published nearly 30 books in English. He is widely seen as a foundational figure in Indian English literature. His poems are a meaningful and substantial contribution to Indian and World literature.

== Early life ==
Dominic Francis Moraes was born in Bombay, British India to Beryl and Frank Moraes, former editor of The Times of India and later The Indian Express. He had a tormented relationship with his mother Beryl, who had been confined to a mental asylum since his childhood. His aunt was the historian Teresa Albuquerque. He attended the city's St. Mary's School, and then left for England to enroll at Jesus College, Oxford.

Moraes spent eight years in Britain (in London and Oxford), New York City, Hong Kong, Delhi and Bombay.

== Career ==
David Archer published Moraes' first collection of poems, A Beginning, in 1957. When he was 19, still an undergraduate, he became the first Indian to win the Hawthornden Prize and was presented with £100 and a silver medal by Lord David Cecil at the Arts Council of Britain on 10 July 1958.

He edited magazines in London, Hong Kong and New York. He became the editor of The Asia Magazine in 1971. He scripted and partially directed over 20 television documentaries for the BBC and ITV. He was a war correspondent in Algeria, Israel and Vietnam. In 1976 he joined the United Nations.

Moraes conducted one of the first interviews of the Dalai Lama after the Tibetan spiritual leader fled to India in 1959. The Dalai Lama was then 23 and Moraes, 20.

== Later life and death ==
In 1961–62 he was one of the very few public Indian figures to strongly criticize the Indian Army takeover of Goa, land of his forefathers – Daman and Diu from Portuguese India. He tore up his Indian passport on TV in protest. He was later allowed back in the country.

When the Gujarat riots erupted in 2002, with their heavy toll of Muslim dead, Moraes left for Ahmedabad the minute the news came through, saying that since he was a Catholic, Muslims would not see him as an enemy. Even though he was physically in considerable pain by then, he was one of the first on the scene.

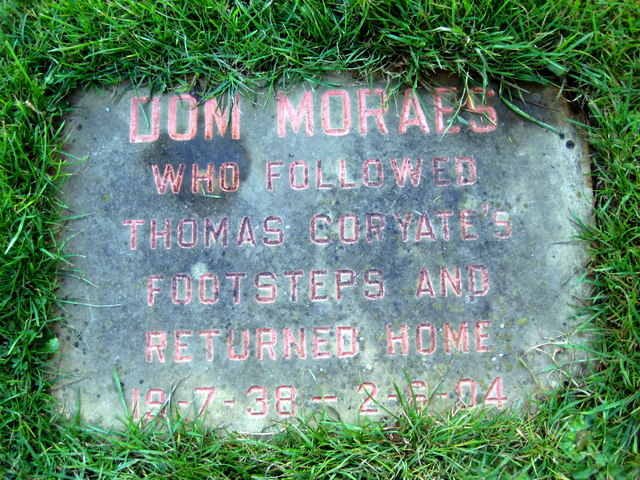
Memorial to Dom Moraes

Moraes ended his writing career, writing books in collaboration with Sarayu Srivatsa.

He had a lifelong battle with alcoholism. Moraes suffered from cancer, but refused treatment and died from a heart attack in Bandra, Mumbai. He was buried in the city's Sewri Cemetery. Many of Dom's old friends and publishers attended the memorial service in Odcombe. A headstone in yellow Jaisalmer stone lies embedded in the front lawn of the Church of St Peter and St Paul to mark the service.

== Personal life ==
In 1956, aged 18, he was courted by Audrey Wendy Abbott who later changed her name to Henrietta. They married in 1961. He left her, according to his close friends in London, but did not divorce her. He had a son with his second wife Judith, whom he divorced, and returned to India in 1968. In 1969, he married the Indian actress Leela Naidu. Their marriage ended in a separation. For the last 13 years of his life he lived with Sarayu Srivatsa, with whom he co-authored two books.

== Bibliography ==
- 1951: Green is the Grass, a book of cricket essays
- 1957: A Beginning, his first book of poems (winner of the Hawthornden Prize in 1958)
- 1960: Poems, his second book of poems
- 1960: Gone Away: An Indian Journey, memoir
- 1965: John Nobody, his third book of poems
- 1967: Beldam & Others, a pamphlet of verse
- 1968: My Son's Father, autobiography
- 1983: Absences, book of poems
- 1987: Collected Poems: 1957-1987 (Penguin)
- 1990: Serendip (winner of the 1994 Sahitya Akademi Award)
- 1992: Out of God's Oven: Travels in a Fractured Land, co-authored with Sarayu Srivatsa
- 1994: Never at Home, memoir (Penguin)
- 2003: The Long Strider, co-authored with Sarayu Srivatsa
- Heiress to Destiny, biography of Indira Gandhi
- 2012: Selected Poems edited by Ranjit Hoskote (Penguin)

== Selections in poetry anthologies ==
- Penguin Modern Poets 2 (1965), some thirty poems in a shared volume with Kingsley Amis and Peter Porter
- The Young British Poets (ed. Jeremy Robson, Chatto & Windus, 1971), a selection of five poems
- The Oxford India Anthology of Twelve Modern Indian Poets (1992) ed. by Arvind Krishna Mehrotra and published by Oxford University Press, New Delhi

== Interviews ==
- "I regret that I didn't write any worthwhile poetry for so long: Dom Moraes" Interview with Tarun Tejpal for India Today, 15 May 1990
- Voices of the Crossing - The impact of Britain on writers from Asia, the Caribbean and Africa. Ferdinand Dennis, Naseem Khan (eds), London: Serpent's Tail, 1998. Dom Moraes: p. 83 "Changes of Scenery."

== See also ==
- Indian poetry in English
- Indian English Literature
