= Ruby Wax =

American-British comedian (born 1953)

Ruby Wax OBE
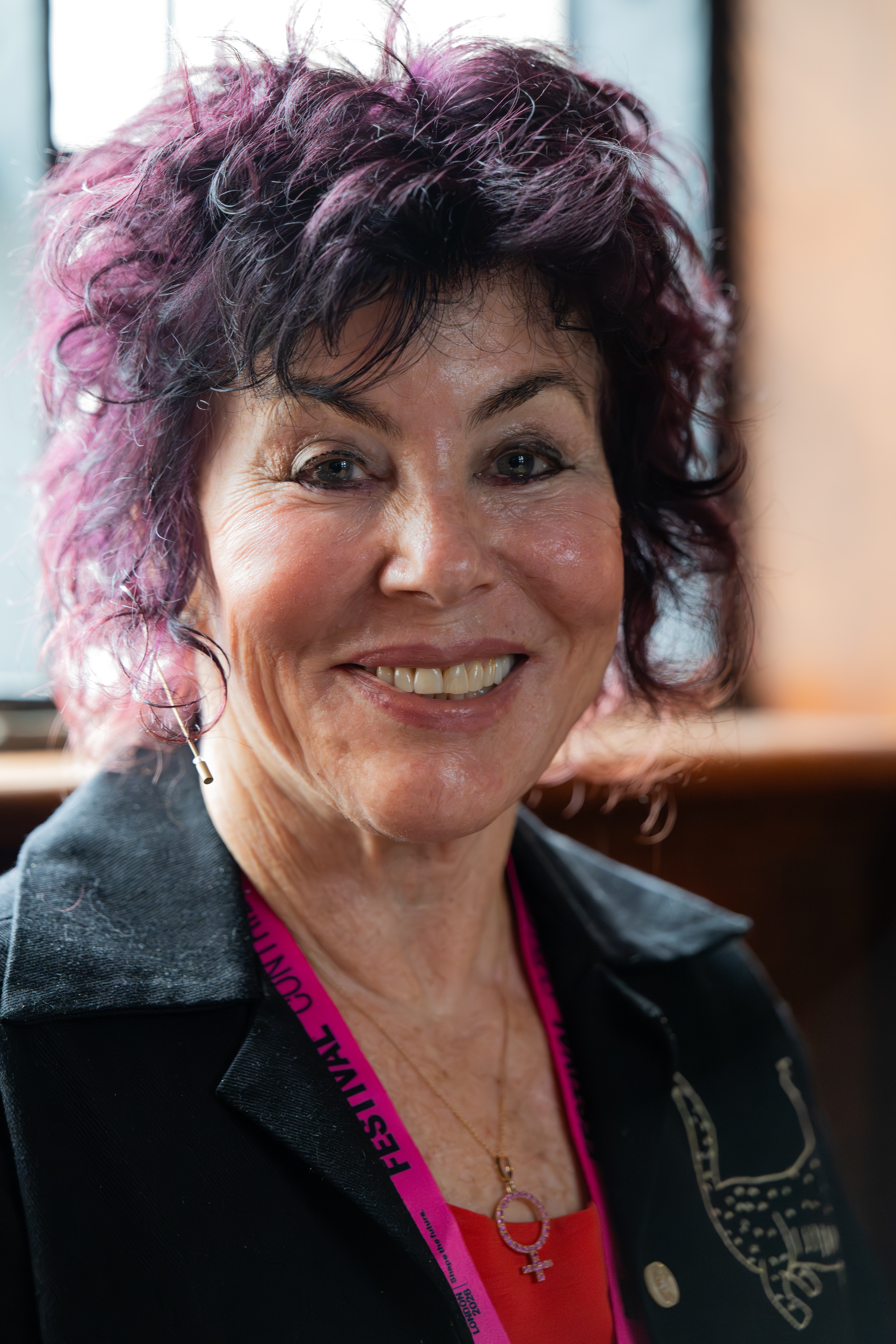
- At SXSW London, June 2026
- Born: Ruby Wachs; 19 April 1953 (age 73); Evanston, Illinois, U.S.
- Citizenship: United States; United Kingdom
- Education: University of California, Berkeley; Royal Scottish Academy of Music and Drama (BA); Regent's College (PgDip); Kellogg College, Oxford (MSt)
- Occupations: Actress; comedian; writer; television presenter; mental health campaigner
- Years active: 1970–present
- Spouses: Andrew Porter (m. 1976; div. 1980); Trevor Walton (m. 1981, divorced); Ed Bye (m. 1988)
- Children: 3
- Website: rubywax.net

Ruby Wax (née Wachs; born 19 April 1953) is an American-British actress, comedian, writer, television presenter, and mental health campaigner. A classically trained actress, Wax began her career performing with the Royal Shakespeare Company, before co-starring on the ITV sitcom Girls on Top (1985–1986). She came to prominence as a comic interviewer, playing up to British perceptions of the strident American style on television shows including The Full Wax (1991–1994), Ruby Wax Meets... (1994–1998), Ruby (1997–2000), and The Ruby Wax Show (2002).

Wax holds both American and British citizenship and has resided in the United Kingdom since the 1970s. She was a script editor for the BBC sitcom Absolutely Fabulous (1992–2012), also appearing in two episodes. In 2025, Wax was a contestant on the twenty-fifth series of the ITV reality show I'm a Celebrity...Get Me Out of Here! finishing in eighth place.

In 2013, Wax gained a master's degree in mindfulness-based cognitive therapy from Kellogg College, Oxford. In 2015, she was appointed a visiting professor in mental health nursing at the University of Surrey. Wax was appointed an Honorary Officer of the Order of the British Empire (OBE) in the 2015 Special Honours for services to mental health. Her memoirs How Do You Want Me? (2002) and Sane New World (2013) both reached number one on the Sunday Times bestseller list.

== Early life ==
Wax was born Ruby Wachs and raised in Evanston, Illinois, the daughter of Edward and Berthe Wachs (née Goldmann). Her parents were Austrian Jews who left Vienna in 1938 because of the Nazi threat. Her father was a sausage manufacturer and her mother qualified as an accountant. Once settled in Chicago, her father changed the spelling of the family surname from Wachs to Wax.

Wax attended Evanston Township High School. She majored in psychology at the University of California, Berkeley, leaving after a year without completing her degree.

== Career ==
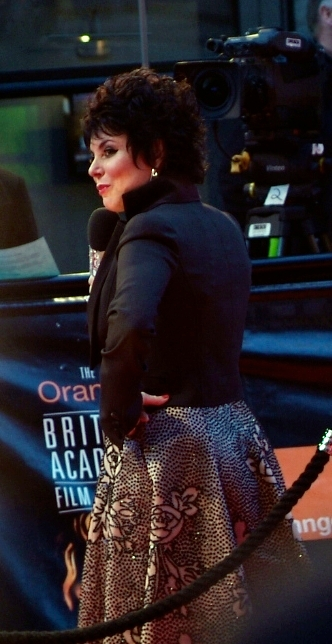
Wax at the 2007 BAFTA awards

=== Early career ===
Wax moved to the UK and studied at the Royal Scottish Academy of Music and Drama in Glasgow. She started her acting career as a straight actress at the Crucible Theatre, Sheffield, where she began a long-standing writing and directing partnership with Alan Rickman, who later directed many of her stage comedy shows.

In 1978, she joined the Royal Shakespeare Company, working alongside Juliet Stevenson in Measure for Measure, as Jaquenetta opposite Michael Hordern in Love's Labours Lost, replacing Zoë Wanamaker as Jane in The Way of the World and appearing in the Howard Brenton three-hander Sore Throats. While at the RSC, Wax also met and befriended Ian Charleson, and later contributed a chapter to the 1990 book, For Ian Charleson: A Tribute. In 1981, Wax appeared as an American track fan in Charleson's breakthrough film, Chariots of Fire. She originally had a much larger role in the film, but it was cut down in editing.

Wax made a one-off appearance in a 1980 episode of The Professionals, Bloodsports, playing Lonnie, an American student. In 1981, she appeared in the follow-up to The Rocky Horror Picture Show, called Shock Treatment. In the film, Wax portrays Betty Hapschatt, who married Ralph Hapschatt in the first film. The same year, Wax also appeared briefly as a secretary in Omen III: The Final Conflict.

=== Comedy work ===
In 1985, she starred as loud-mouthed American actress Shelley DuPont on the British sitcom Girls on Top.

In 1987, Wax was given her own comedy chat show, Don't Miss Wax, on Channel 4. She was also hired as a radio presenter by the Superstation, an overnight sustaining service for commercial radio in the UK. In December 1989, she appeared in the Red Dwarf episode "Timeslides" as the television host Blaize Falconberger of the fictional show "Lifestyles of the Disgustingly Rich and Famous".

Wax began working with the BBC in 1991, with the show The Full Wax (1991–94). In 1994, Ruby Wax Meets Madonna aired on the BBC, followed by the series Ruby Wax Meets... (1996–98), in which she interviewed public figures such as Imelda Marcos, O. J. Simpson, and Pamela Anderson. Ruby Wax Meets... was nominated for a 1997 BAFTA Award (credited to Clive Tulloh and Don Boyd), for an interview with Sarah, Duchess of York, an interview which attracted over 14 million viewers. She also made two guest appearances in Absolutely Fabulous, a programme on which she served as script editor throughout the run of the series.

From November 2001 to June 2002, Wax presented a TV quiz show on BBC One, The Waiting Game. Her final BBC interview series aired in 2003. In 2005 Wax appeared as a cleaner in the music video to McFly's Comic Relief song "All About You".

=== Writing, academe, corporate training and returns to television and stage ===
In 2002, Wax became the host of Commercial Breakdown. In that year, Wax published her memoir How Do You Want Me?, which topped The Sunday Times best-seller list.

In March 2003, Wax was one of the celebrity contestants on Comic Relief does Fame Academy, a spin-off from the BBC's Fame Academy, with all proceeds donated to Comic Relief. Although not a good singer, Wax made it to the final, taking runner-up position to Will Mellor.

In 2004, the BBC planned to show the cartoon series Popetown, poking fun at the Catholic Church. Wax portrayed the Pope as a spoiled child. After protests, the BBC did not broadcast the show.

In February 2004, Irish broadcaster Patricia Danaher reached an out-of-court settlement with Wax, who had falsely claimed Danaher had made "racist" and "anti-Semitic" remarks about her in an interview for Ulster Television. Wax's legal team apologised in court, accepted Danaher had made no racist or antisemitic statements, and announced there had been a financial settlement.

In November 2005, Wax was criticised by the Daily Mail columnist Richard Kay for allegedly opposing a proposed disabled-access ramp for the Couper Collection charitable art gallery. The UK Sunday newspaper The Observer also reported the controversy. In 2006, Wax responded to the claims in the London Evening Standard: "Oh no, that's not true. That's so off the wall. Why would I object to a disabled ramp? It wasn't even about that."

Wax appeared in a supporting role opposite Olivia Williams and Andie MacDowell in the 2005 film Tara Road. In September and October 2005, she appeared as a celebrity contestant in Ant & Dec's Gameshow Marathon, progressing through to Sale of the Century before getting knocked out. In summer 2006, she was a celebrity showjumper in the BBC's Sport Relief event Only Fools on Horses. She presented Cirque de Celebrité on Sky One in 2006. Wax also appeared in an episode of Jackass, participating in the Gumball 3000. While the race was stopped at the Latvian border she was wrestled by Jackass personality Chris Pontius.

In March 2009, Wax returned to Comic Relief to take part in Comic Relief Does The Apprentice. Wax appeared in the 2011 Comic Relief in Comic Relief Does Masterchef in which Wax prepared an appetiser for then Prime Minister David Cameron.

On 1 April 2009, Ruby Wax Goes Dutch premiered on Dutch television network NET 5.

She was appointed Chancellor of the University of Southampton, commencing duties on 1 May 2019.

Wax teaches business communication in the public and private sectors. Clients include Deutsche Bank, the UK Home Office and Skype.

In September 2013, Wax graduated from Kellogg College, Oxford, with a master's degree in mindfulness-based cognitive therapy. She had previously earned a postgraduate certificate in psychotherapy and counselling from Regent's College in London.

In 2016, Wax published her first mindfulness book, A Mindfulness Guide For The Frazzled, within which she sets out her own six-week mindfulness course with the blessing of Mark Williams, her professor at Oxford and co-creator of mindfulness-based cognitive therapy.

After the 2020 lockdown period caused by the COVID-19 pandemic, her book And Now for the Good News... was published. Still related to mindfulness, it discusses her discovery of new ways for education, community, self-sustainability, business or volunteering to improve lives internationally. Her book A Mindfulness Guide For Survival was published in August 2021.

She lectures at Bangor University and in 2022 received an honorary degree from the university.

In November 2025, Wax was announced as a contestant on the twenty-fifth series of I'm a Celebrity...Get Me Out of Here!. She finished the show in 8th place.

== Mental health campaigning ==
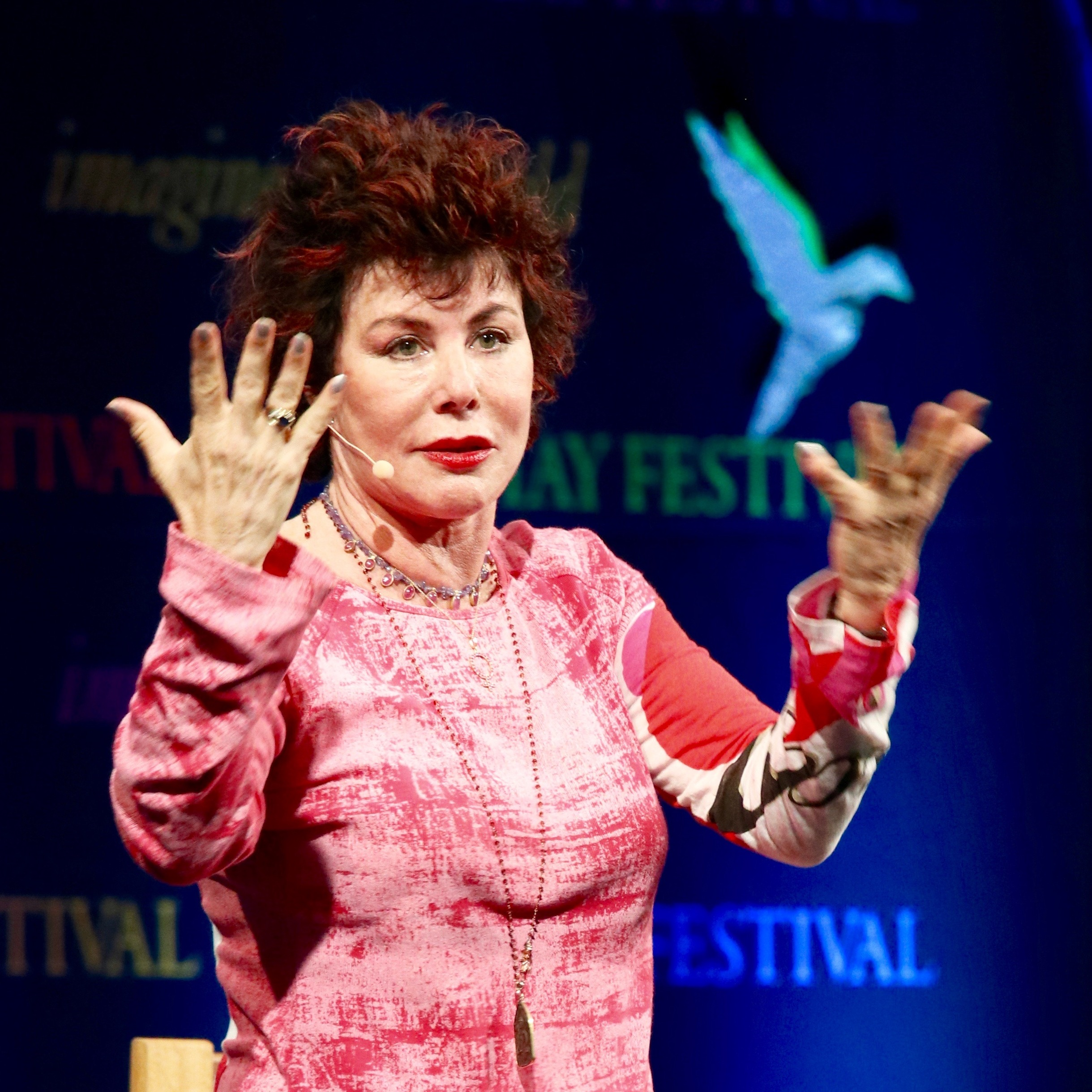
Wax in 2016

Wax has been open about her struggles with bipolar disorder and depression. She made an online series on mental health issues for the BBC and has worked with mental health charities.

Wax's 2010 stand-up show Losing It dealt with her mental health, including time she spent in a psychiatric clinic. Wax founded the mental health website (which is now part of the SANE mental health charity) in 2011 in response to the audience reaction from her theatre show.

In 2013, Wax published Sane New World, which became a number-one best-seller. It was followed in January 2016 by A Mindfulness Guide for the Frazzled. In 2018 her third book on the subject of mental health came out: How to Be Human: The Manual, written with the help of a neuroscientist and a monk.

In June 2015, Wax was appointed visiting professor in Mental Health Nursing at the University of Surrey. In the 2015 Special Honours, she was appointed an Honorary Officer of the Order of the British Empire (OBE) for her services to mental health.

In May 2023, Wax released her new book and accompanying audiobook I’m Not As Well As I Thought I Was, which details her recent life including further time spent receiving psychiatric treatment and battles against depression. She toured a one-woman show based on the book.

== Personal life ==
Wax studied at the Royal Scottish Academy of Music and Drama. Later, during her six years with the Royal Shakespeare Company, she began writing comedy. Alan Rickman, her flatmate and best friend, directed her comedy shows, casting Zoë Wanamaker, David Suchet, Richard Griffiths and Jonathan Pryce. "I made him laugh, and he made me think,...If I could make him laugh, it was a triumph. In fact, the only reason I went into comedy was to make Alan laugh".

Wax is married to television producer and director Ed Bye. They have three children: Max (born 1988), Madeleine (born 1990), and Marina (born 1993).

In an episode of the BBC's Who Do You Think You Are? in 2017, Wax revealed her great-grandmother and great-aunt had been committed to mental asylums in Brno and Vienna as they were incurably "agitated".

In 2019, Wax fell off a horse while on holiday, severely injuring her back. She had to cancel her show How to Be Human at the Edinburgh Festival Fringe as a result of her injuries.

Wax has been a naturalised British citizen since the 1970s, while retaining her American citizenship.

== Filmography ==
=== Film ===
Year	Title	Role	Notes
1981	Chariots of Fire	Bunty	
1981	Shock Treatment	Betty Hapschatt	
1981	Omen III: The Final Conflict	U.S. Ambassador's Secretary	Uncredited
1982	Things Are Tough All Over	Restaurant Patron	
1985	Romance on the Orient Express	Susan Lawson	Television film
1985	Water	Spenco Executive	
1986	Come Dancing	Herself	Documentary film
1998	Ruby Wax's Miami Memoirs	Herself	Documentary film
1991	Ruby Takes a Trip...	Herself	Documentary film
1992	Wax Acts	Herself	Documentary film
1997	The Borrowers	Town Hall Clerk	
2000	Ruby Wax Gets Streetwise	Herself	Documentary film
2005	Tara Road	Carlotta	
2008	Agent Crush	Charleen Chinstubble (voice)	
2011	The British Guide to Showing Off	Herself	Documentary film
2012	Sir Billi	Patty Turner (voice)	
2021	Ron's Gone Wrong	Ms. Hartley (voice)	

=== Television ===
Year	Title	Role	Notes
1979	Not the Nine O'Clock News		1 episode
1980	The Professionals	Lonnie	Episode: "Blood Sports"
1985	Happy Families	Waitress	Episode: "Cassie"
1985–1986	Girls on Top	Shelley	13 episodes
1986–1992	Wogan	Herself	5 episodes
1987–1988	Don't Miss Wax	Herself - Host	16 episodes
1988–1989	Wax on Wheels	Herself	
1988–1993	Count Duckula	Various (voice)	15 episodes
1989	Red Dwarf	Blaize Falconberger	Episode: "Timeslides"
1989	East Meets Wax	Herself	
1989	Class of '69	Presenter	
1990	Hit and Run	Presenter	1 episode
1991–1994	The Full Wax	Presenter	23 episodes
1992	The Comic Strip Presents...	Sue	Episode: "Wild Turkey"
1992	Wax Acts	Presenter	
1993	Wax Cracks Hollywood	Presenter	
1994–1998	Ruby Wax Meets...	Presenter	21 episodes
1995, 2001	Absolutely Fabulous	Candy / Beth De Woodi	Also script editor (39 episodes)
1996	Oscar's Orchestra	Hannah the Harp (voice)	
1997–2000	Ruby	Presenter	BBC talk show; 48 episodes
1999–2000	Ruby's American Pie	Presenter	12 episodes
1999	Ruby	Presenter	Talk-reality show airing on Lifetime; 10 episodes
2001	Hot Wax	Presenter	
2001–2002	The Waiting Game	Presenter	
2002	Commercial Breakdown	Presenter	8 episodes
2002	The Ruby Wax Show	Presenter	
2002–2003	V Graham Norton	Herself - Guest	4 episodes
2003	Ruby Wax With...	Presenter	6 episodes
2003	Comic Relief Does Fame Academy	Herself	Series one
2003	The Big Read	Herself	2 episodes
2003	Have I Got News for You	Herself	1 episode
2004	Ruby Does the Business	Herself	Mini-series
2004	Planet Cook	Roxie (voice)	
2004	French and Saunders	The Executive	1 episode
2005	Jackass	Herself	Episode: "Gumball 3000 Rally Special"
2005	Gameshow Marathon	Herself - Contestant	4 episodes
2006	Cirque de Celebrité	Presenter	10 episodes
2006	Popetown	The Pope (voice)	10 episodes
2006	Dawn French's Girls Who Do Comedy	Herself	3 episodes
2009	Taking the Flak	Candida	Episode: "Black Gold"
2012	Ruby Wax's Mad Confessions	Herself	
2013	Anna & Katy	Herself	1 episode
2013	College Tour	Herself	1 episode
2013	The Spa	Herself	Episode: "Christmas Special: Strangers in the Night"
2014	Crackanory	Host - Presenter	Episode: "Let Me Be the Judge & I'm Still Here"
2017	Who Do You Think You Are?	Herself	1 episode
2017	Head Talks	Herself	
2017	Thunderbirds Are Go	Hayley Edmonds (voice)	Episode: "Bolt from the Blue"
2018	Ruby Wax: How to Be Human	Presenter	Mini-series
2020	Question Time	Herself	1 episode
2021	When Ruby Wax Met…	Herself	3 episodes
2022	Countdown	Herself	Dictionary corner; 5 episodes
2022	The Great Celebrity Bake Off for Stand Up to Cancer	Herself	1 episode
2022	Celebrity Gogglebox for Stand Up to Cancer	Herself	1 episode; Series 20 episode 8
2022	Trailblazers: A Rocky Mountain Road Trip	Herself	3 episodes
2023	Ruby Wax: Cast Away	Herself	2 episodes
2023	The Weakest Link	Celebrity Contestant	1 episode
2025	Andor	Moffi and Toffi	Good Morning, Coruscant hosts; 1 episode
2025	I'm a Celebrity...Get Me Out of Here!	Contestant	Series 25

== Stage ==
Year	Title	Role(s)	Venue	Ref.
1977	The Days of the Commune	Woman	Aldwych Theatre	
1977	The Alchemist	Neighbour	Aldwych Theatre	
1978	The Way of the World	Betty	Aldwych Theatre	
1978	The Tempest	Spirit	Royal Shakespeare Theatre	
1978	The Taming of the Shrew	performer	Royal Shakespeare Theatre	
1978	Measure for Measure	Nun, Whore	Royal Shakespeare Theatre	
1978	Love's Labour's Lost	Jaquenetta	Royal Shakespeare Theatre	
1979	The Johnson Wax Show	performer, writer	Gulbenkian Studio	
1979	Desperately Yours	performer	Gulbenkian Studio	
1979	Love's Labour's Lost	Jaquenetta	Aldwych Theatre	
1979	The Taming of the Shrew	performer	Aldwych Theatre	
1979	The Innocent	Suzie	Warehouse	
1979	Wild Oats	Jane, Maid	Aldwych Theatre	
1979	Sore Throats	Sally	Warehouse	
2005	The Witches	The Grand High Witch	Wyndham's Theatre	

== Bibliography ==
- How Do You Want Me? (2002)
- Sane New World (2013)
- A Mindfulness Guide for the Frazzled (2016)
- How to Be Human: The Manual (2018)
- And Now for the Good News...: The Much-needed Tonic for Our Frazzled World (2020)
- Mindfulness Guide for Survival (2021)
- I’m Not As Well As I Thought I Was (2023)
