= Anthony-Noel Kelly =

British artist (born 1956)

Anthony-Noel Kelly (born 1956) is a British artist who was found guilty of the theft of body parts from the Royal College of Surgeons (RCS), which he had used to make moulds for sculptures. He was sentenced to nine months imprisonment in 1998, and the case raised issues of the ethics of art and the legal status of body parts used for medical research.

Between 1991 and 1994 he persuaded an RCS employee to smuggle out the dissected remains of up to 40 bodies from the Royal College of Surgeons Casts of the body parts were used for an exhibition at the London Contemporary Art Fair in 1997. The cadavers were exhibited in a series of casts, painted silver and pinned to a wall, in order to view anatomy "in a historical context" according to Kelly. However, he was arrested soon after and formally charged with stealing human bodies following the discovery of plaster casts of deceased men and women as well as around 30 body parts during police raids at his South London studio and his family's home, Romden Castle in Kent, in April 1997.

Kelly's guilty verdict was made possible by a landmark ruling by the trial judge, Geoffrey Rivlin, that consistent with the rule in the Australian case Doodeward v Spence, human remains prepared for medical research could be property to which the RCS had a right of possession. Consistent with the Theft Act 1968, they were therefore capable of being stolen. He and Lyndsay were the first people ever to be convicted in England for stealing body parts. Kelly was sentenced to nine months in prison. The lab technician who had helped him, Neil Lindsey, received a six-month suspended sentence. Both sentences were revised on appeal.

Kelly was later able to reclaim art works confiscated by the police, based on what he described as a "legal technicality". His work was exhibited in 2000 at the Anne Faggionato Gallery, London.
