= Andrew Logan (sculptor) =

English sculptor, performance artist, jewellery-maker and portraitist

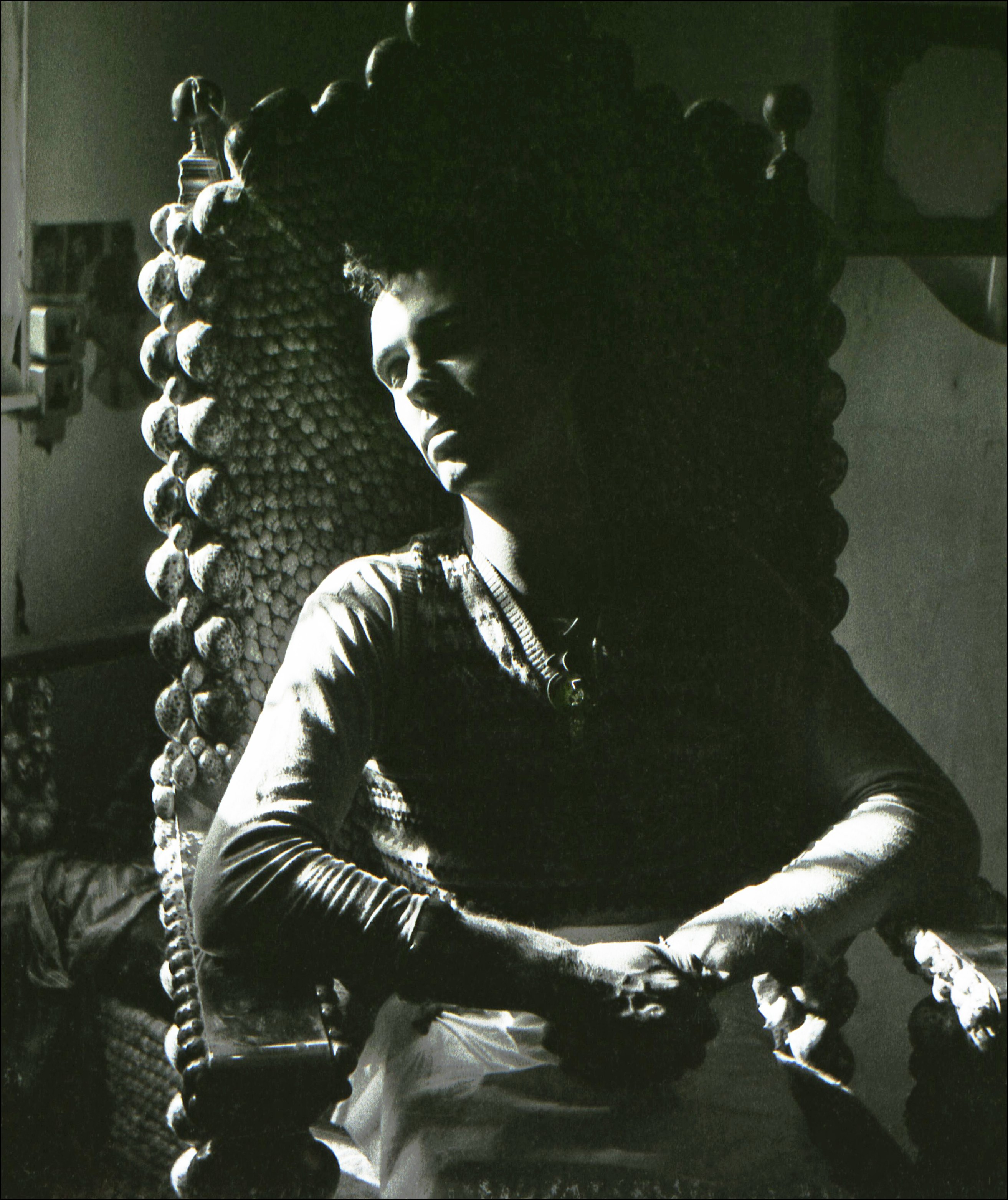
- Andrew Logan in 1971
- Born: 11 October 1945 (age 80); Witney, Oxfordshire, England
- Education: Oxford School of Architecture
- Years active: 1970–present
- Known for: Sculpture, jewellery, performance art
- Partner: Michael Davis
- Father: William Harold Logan
- Website: http://www.andrewlogan.com/

Andrew Logan MBE (born 11 Oct 1945) is an English sculptor, performance artist, jewellery-maker, and portraitist. He founded the Alternative Miss World in 1972, and his works have been exhibited in museums around the world. A museum dedicated to his works, The Andrew Logan Museum of Sculpture, opened in Berriew in Wales in 1991.

== Biography ==
Andrew Logan was born in Witney, Oxfordshire, in England on 11 October 1945. The son of William Harold Logan and the third of six children, he attended Lord Williams' Grammar School and Burford Grammar School. He went to study architecture at the Oxford School of Architecture in 1964, graduating in 1970.

Logan produced his first work in the late 1960s. He received some attention in 1970 with a room he created for the 'Ten Sitting Rooms' exhibition at the London Institute of Contemporary Arts. Starting in the 1970s, he also created sculptures, sound installations, portraits using pieces of mirror, and jewellery. His had his first sculpture ('a nine-foot silver lily') commissioned for a shop in Soho. He visited India in the 1980s and created a number of large pieces there.

In 1973, Logan founded the Alternative Miss World, which he continued to run with the last one held in 2026. He influenced film-maker Derek Jarman, whose early film-making work documented the social scene around Logan and his studios at Butler's Wharf, London. Malcolm McLaren and Vivienne Westwood staged the "Valentine's Ball", at which the Sex Pistols first came to media attention, at his studios in 1976.

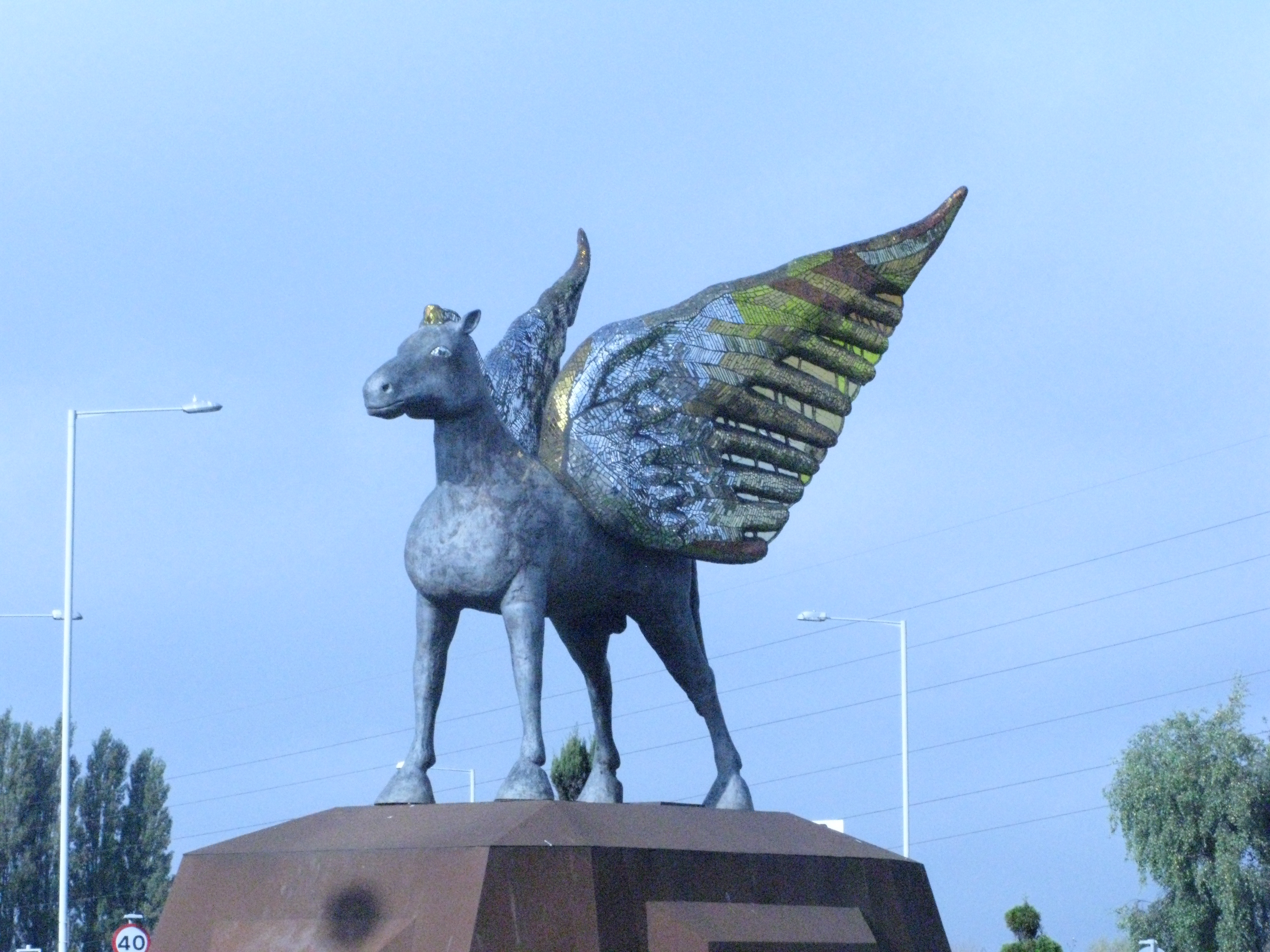
Dudley, Scotts Green Island Millennium (Pegasus)

In 1991 a major retrospective of his work was held at the Museum of Modern Art, Oxford. The Andrew Logan Museum of Sculpture, at Berriew in the Welsh Marches, opened in 1991 and houses much of his sculpture and painting in converted squash courts. Works exhibited included a Cosmic Egg, The Living Taj Mahal and Egypt Revisited.

Since the early Nineties, Logan has continued to exhibit his sculptures and jewellery at Saint Petersburg in Russia, Latvia, Lithuania, India, Beverly Hills in Los Angeles and Mexico. His work has been shown in and commissioned by international galleries, including the American Visionary Art Museum in Baltimore, the Flower East Gallery in London, the Victoria & Albert Museum, the Hayward Gallery, Bonhams, the National Portrait Gallery, Sotheby's in London, the Royal Academy of Arts, the National Trust’s Buckland Abbey and Somerset House.

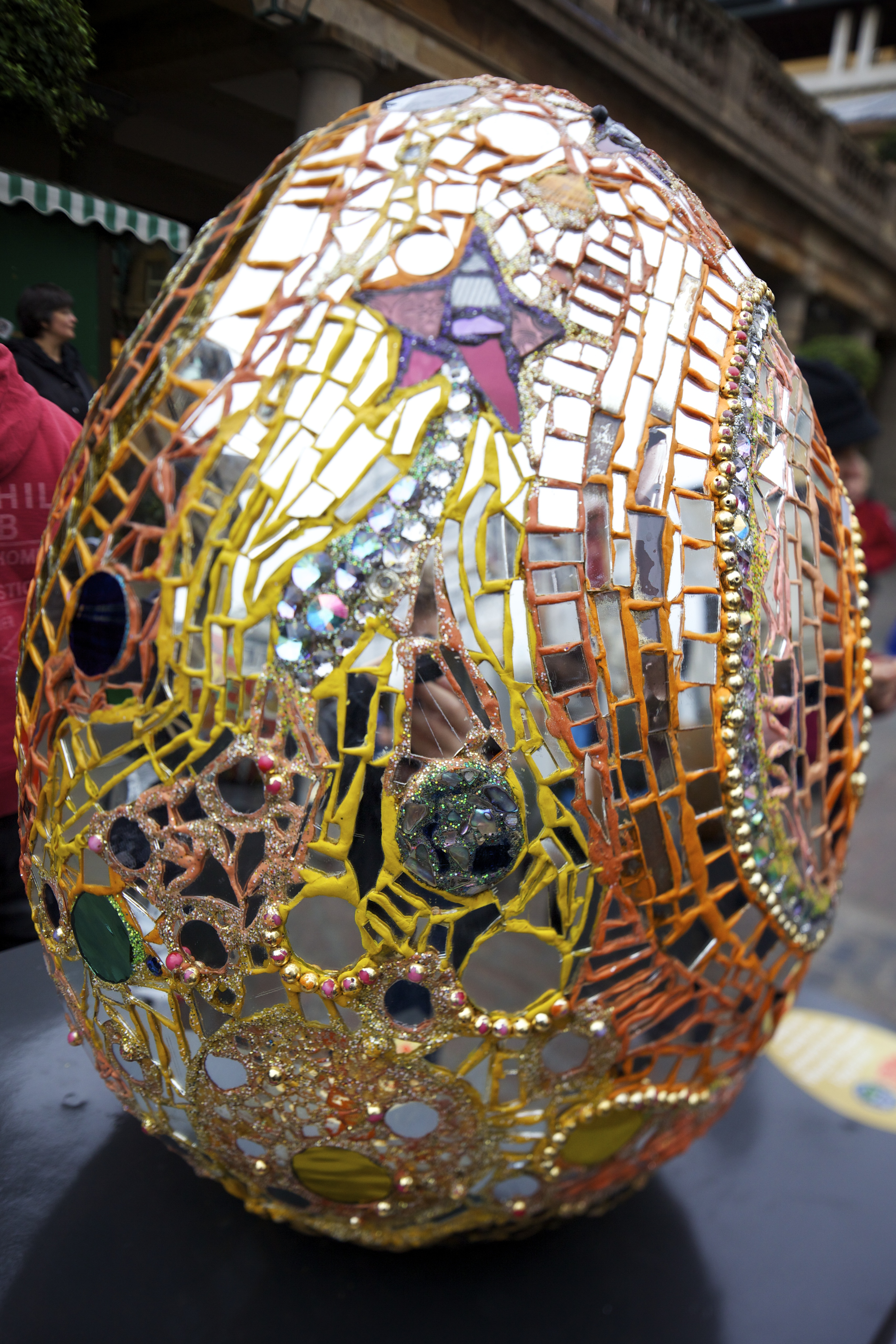
The Golden Cosmic Egg by Andrew Logan

In London, he has exhibited in venues including Trafalgar Square, the foyer of Sadler's Wells Theatre, and West End cinemas. His lifesize horse sculptures, Pegasus 1 and 11 were displayed at Heathrow Airport, and his 'Icarus' sculpture hangs in Guy's Hospital. The P & O Superliner Arcadia commissioned him to sculpt his Cosmic Eggs (8 ft. tall), and his Mermaid Chandelier was exhibited at the American Visionary Art Museum in Baltimore, USA.

In the new millennium, Logan created jewelled sculptures for The Magic Flute opera in San Diego. In 2004, Logan's eleventh Alternative Miss World contest was held at the Hippodrome in London. In May 2007 Logan was invited to be part of the jury for a children's beauty contest in Sochi. In July, his jewellery was auctioned at Halls Fine Art in Shrewsbury. He was asked to decorate a guitar for a high-profile charity auction held in London. In August, he was invited to participate in three events in The Big Draw: he collaborated with Zandra Rhodes on The Big Picture Frame at the V&A Museum of Childhood in Bethnal Green, he gave a presentation of his watercolours in The Newsroom at The Guardian and in Covent Garden.

In 2017 an exhibition of many pieces of sculpture by Logan titled The Art of Reflection was held at the National Trust's Buckland Abbey in Devon with works from 1976 to 2017.

== Personal life ==
Logan has a sister and five brothers. He has been with his partner Michael Davis since 1972. He received an MBE for services to the arts in the King's Birthday Honours list in 2024.
