= Victor Rangel-Ribeiro =

American writer (born 1925)

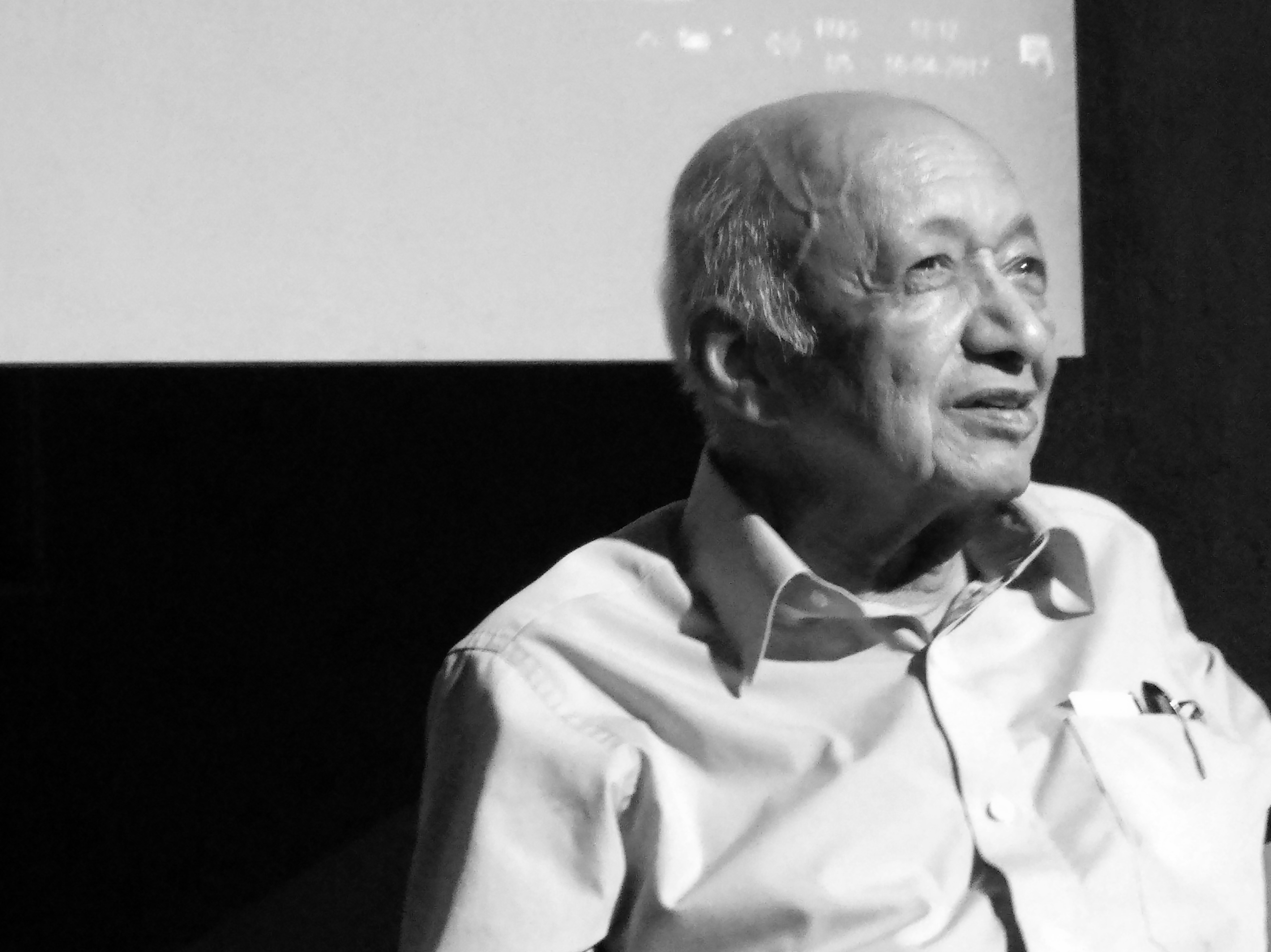
- Rangel-Ribeiro in 2017
- Born: 3 October 1925 (age 100); Goa, Portuguese India
- Education: Teachers College, Columbia University (M.A.)
- Occupations: Writer; journalist; music conductor; editor
- Spouse: Lea Rangel-Ribeiro (died 2011)
- Children: 2
- Writing career
- Notable awards: Milkweed National Fiction Prize (1998)

Victor Rangel-Ribeiro (born 3 October 1925) is an American writer, former journalist, music conductor and editor. His is most noted as the author of Tivolem (1998), whose writing was funded by a New York Foundation for the Arts Fiction Fellowship (awarded 1991), and which was awarded the Milkweed National Fiction Prize and shortlisted for the Crossword Book Award.

== Early life ==
Born in Portuguese Goa in 1925, he lived in Saligão village. He counts Konkani, Portuguese, and English as his three mother tongues. He moved to Bombay and took his BA from St. Xavier's College, Mumbai in 1945. The 1940s already saw a number of his English-language short stories appearing in British Indian publications.

== Career ==
Rangel-Ribeiro began his career by teaching at a high school in Bombay. He then began working as a journalist.

After Indian independence in 1947, he became an assistant editor and music critic of the National Standard, Sunday editor for the Calcutta edition of the Times of India (1953), and a literary editor for The Illustrated Weekly. He was the first Indian to be appointed Copy Chief at the advertising giant J Walter Thompson's Bombay office, but migrated to the US just months later.

In 1956, he emigrated to the United States, along with his wife, Lea, and worked part-time as a music critic for the New York Times. From 1964 to 1973 he ran a music antiquariat in New York City, became director of the New York Beethoven Society (overseeing its entry into the Lincoln Center for the Performing Arts).

In 1983, he took an MA from Teachers College, Columbia University, taught for a time in private and public schools, and then became involved in coordinating adult literacy teaching.

In 1998, he wrote his first book, Tivolem, which won the Milkweed National Fiction Prize that year. In 2017, he released a collection of short stories written by him in his entire career, titled The Miscreant: Selected Stories (1949-2016). The same year, he released a biography of artist F. N. Souza titled F N Souza: The Legend, The Myths, The Facts, having known Souza for many years in New York.

== Personal life ==
Rangel-Ribeiro and his musician-educationist wife Lea (d. 2011) have two children, Eva and Eric. He holds American citizenship since 1956.

== Works ==
This is a partial bibliography.

=== Non-fiction ===
- Souza: The Artist, His Loves and His Times (Goa: Goa Publications Pvt. Ltd., 2019) – biography of F. N. Souza

=== Novels ===
- Tivolem (Minneapolis: Milkweed, 1998)

=== Short stories ===
- 'The Miscreant', The Iowa Review 20.2 (1990): 52–65,
- 'Madonna of the Raindrops' and 'Day of the Baptist', Literary Review, 39.4 (1998)
- 'Senhor Eusebio Builds his Dream House' and 'Angel Wings', in Ferry Crossing: Short Stories from Goa, ed. by Manohar Shetty (New Delhi: Penguin, 1998)
- Loving Ayesha and Other Tales from Near and Far (2002)
- 'Keeping in Touch', The Little Magazine, 2.4
- 'The Miscreant', Selected Stories 1949-2016 (2017)
- 'Rescuing Patricia', The Brave New World of Goan Writing & Art 2025 (2025)

=== Music ===
- Baroque Music, a Practical Guide for the Performer (New York: Schirmer, 1981)
- Victor Rangel-Ribeiro and Robert Markel. Chamber Music: An International Guide to Works and Their Instrumentation (New York: Facts on File, 1993)
- Damoreau, Laure-Cinthie, Classic Bel Canto Technique, trans. by Victor Rangel-Ribeiro (Mineola: Dover, 1997)
- Chausson, Ernest, Selected Songs for Voice and Piano, trans. by Victor Rangel-Ribeiro (Mineola: Dover, 1998)
- Chausson, Ernest, Concerto in D for Piano, Violin, and String Quartet, Op. 21 in Full Score, ed. by Victor Rangel-Ribeiro (Minneola: Dover, 1999)
- Saint-Saens, Camille, Danse Macabre and Other Works for Piano Solo, ed. by Victor Rangel-Ribeiro (Mineola: Dover, 1999)
- Satie, Erik, Parade and Other Works for Piano Four Hands, ed. by Victor Rangel-Ribeiro (Mineola: Dover, 1999)
- Satie, Erik, Parade in Full Score, ed. by Victor Rangel-Ribeiro (Mineola: Dover, 2000)
