= The Bill series 14 =

Season of television series

The Bill
- Series 14
- No. of episodes: 121

Release
- Original network: ITV
- Original release: 1 January – 31 December 1998

Series chronology
- ← Previous; Series 13 Next → Series 15

The fourteenth series of The Bill, a British television drama, consists of 121 episodes, broadcast between 1 January and 31 December 1998.

== Background ==
The series began with the appointment of new executive producer Richard Handford, who replaced Michael Chapman after his 9-year reign came to an end in the previous series. The appointment preceded discussions with broadcaster ITV about returning to the format of hour-long episodes, which the show last used on a regular basis in 1987. The request was approved, and hour-long episodes began to air twice-weekly beginning in August, a format the series retained until moving to a later time slot in 2009. Due to the rapid transition, several of the first hour-long episodes were originally written for the half-hour time slot, and thus, some episodes contain two completely different stories, written by different writers, which jump from one to another. For example, the opening episode, "Deep End", was initially written in three twenty-five-minute parts, with a fourth epilogue episode, the first half of "The Party's Over", all conceived by Elizabeth Anne-Wheal. A separate story by Neil Clarke, initially envisaged as an entirely separate episode, was broadcast as the second half of "The Party's Over".

Handford also attempted to introduce a more serialised element to the programme; however, individual stand-alone episodes were retained. The first major multipart storylines came towards the autumn and aired back-to-back; PC Eddie Santini (played by Michael Higgs), who was introduced at the beginning of the series, emerged as a villain as he attempted to rape new WPC Rosie Fox before bullying her out of Sun Hill in a four-part storyline. The plot would be revisited in another four-part storyline during the following series. The second plot saw PC Tony Stamp face trial for killing a pedestrian with the Area Car. The reception to the serialised episodes were popular, and while there weren't any other episodes of this kind that aired after these two storylines, serialised, multipart storylines were frequently seen whilst Handford was executive producer. In addition to format changes, Handford dramatically changed the title sequence, which had been the same barring minor updates since the first series, with the theme song tweaked and the scene of the Area Car driving at the camera and images of the cast replaced by various scenes involving police work including vehicles, interviews and prisoner processing.

Among the six character exits, the most high-profile was that of Kevin Lloyd as DC Tosh Lines. Lloyd, who appeared in approximately 454 episodes over a 10-year period, was dismissed from the show after turning up for filming too intoxicated to work, and died less than a week later after an unsuccessful stint in rehab. His final episode aired on 9 June, just over a month after his death. DS Alistair Greig and WPC Norika Datta departed after 9 years each on the show, along with WDC Suzi Croft and PC Mike Jarvis (5 years apiece) and WPC Debbie Keane (3 years). Among those to join the cast were George Rossi, who took on the role of DC Duncan Lennox after a guest appearance in the previous series, while Samantha Robson was cast as WPC Vicky Hagen, the show's first female Area Car driver. The biggest arrival was that of now-DCI Frank Burnside, who appeared in a two-part special that included scenes filmed in Manchester, as Christopher Ellison returned to the role five years after leaving Sun Hill as a DI.

== Cast changes ==
=== Arrivals ===
- PC Eddie Santini (Episode 12–)
- WPC Vicky Hagen (Episode 51–)
- WPC Rosie Fox (Episodes 89–92)
- WDC Kerry Holmes (Episode 98–)
- DC Duncan Lennox (Episode 109–)

=== Departures ===
- WDC Suzi Croft – Accepts a transfer to High Barnet
- PC Mike Jarvis – Accepts a transfer to the Diplomatic Protection Group
- DC Tosh Lines – Presumably moves to the Coroner's Office (although, owing to the untimely death of actor Kevin Lloyd, the manner of his exit is up for debate)
- WPC Norika Datta – Accepts a transfer to the Crime Policy Unit
- DS Alistair Greig – Transfers due to his appeal against tenure being rejected
- WPC Rosie Fox – Requests transfer after attempted rape and bullying campaign by Eddie Santini
- WPC Debbie Keane – Unexplained

== Episodes ==
#	Title	Episode notes	Directed by	Written by	Original air date
1	"Square Peg, Round Hole"	First episode executive produced by Richard Handford; Lorraine Bruce guest stars	Delyth Thomas	Stephen McAteer	1 January 1998
When a raid on a known drug addict goes awry, Boulton is spiked by the desperate criminal's needle, leaving Sun Hill's tough guy frightened, angry, and in need of an HIV test.
2	"You Pays Your Money"	Richard Mylan guest stars	James Hawes	Jason Sutton	2 January 1998
Ackland and Quinnan investigate when a family is strangely silent about the death of their landlord.
3	"Hard Cash"	New title sequence and theme introduced; Michael Turner, Gary Waldhorn and Jim McManus guest star	Mike Vardy	Chris Ould	6 January 1998
Beech and Carver go in search of a haul of £30,000 in banknotes, missing from a six-year-old robbery.
4	"Taking It Easy"	Hugh Armstrong guest stars	Delyth Thomas	Kevin Scouler	8 January 1998
When an old man loses his life savings in a mugging, Boyden and Stamp suspect it was something more than coincidence.
5	"Villain"	Geoffrey Chater guest stars	Roger Gartland	Isabelle Grey	9 January 1998
Boyden deals with a frail old man brought into custody, accused of attempted murder.
6	"Forgive and Forget"	Laurie Brett guest stars	Mike Vardy	Stephen Greenhorn	13 January 1998
Boyden and Stamp attempt to contain a father who wants revenge for his murdered son.
7	"Girl Power"	Vanessa Cavanagh and Brooke Kinsella guest star	Catherine Morshead	Katharine Way	15 January 1998
When a young girl has to carry a knife to defend herself at school, Keane and Stamp know it is time to step in.
8	"Puppy Walk"	Fred Ridgeway and Roger Alborough guest star	Tim Holloway	Maxwell Young	16 January 1998
Stamp is cynical when he feels a woman with a sob story may be playing games, but Ashton is taken in by her charms.
9	"Sprog"	—	Ged Maguire	Rod Lewis	20 January 1998
Stamp and Page are sceptical, as Ashton suggests there is more to a burglary than appears.
10	"Out on a Limb"	Adie Allen guest stars	Derek Lister	Colin Wyatt	22 January 1998
It's a life-or-death situation for Skase and Proctor when an assassin comes looking for his money; can they work together to defuse the situation?
11	"Way Out West"	John Rogan and Dean Cook guest star	Tim Holloway	Scott Cherry	23 January 1998
Jarvis is full of his secondment to the Diplomatic Protection Group, so Stamp and Quinnan hatch a mischievous plan to take him down a peg or two.
12	"Storyboards"	First appearance of PC Eddie Santini; Neil Newbon guest stars	Danny Hiller	J. C. Wilsher	29 January 1998
New PC Eddie Santini, tall, dark and handsome with a dubious past, causes a stir when he arrives to join the team at Sun Hill.
13	"For Your Love"	Hour-long episode; Marc Bannerman, Lois Baxter P. H. Moriarty and Rachel Shelley guest star	Brian Farnham	Neil Clarke	30 January 1998
Rawton and Skase assist a woman receiving anonymous threats.
14	"Soft in the Head"	Lara Cazalet and Roger Blake guest star	Chris Lovett	Tom Needham	3 February 1998
Ashton goes missing from the scene of an accident, but he has a chance to make a difference when faced with an old acquaintance.
15	"Friends in High Places"	Hermione Norris guest stars	Chris Lovett	Patrick Melanaphy	5 February 1998
A car belonging to one of Brownlow's rivals is stolen right from under Santini and Quinnan's noses.
16	"Love's Labours Lost"	Annabelle Apsion, Lucy Briers and Alison Newman guest star	Robin Sheppard	Clive Dawson	6 February 1998
Proctor and Skase investigate the stalking of Proctor's ex-girlfriend.
17	"Opposites"	Richard Stirling and David Burke guest star	Robin Sheppard	Michael Jenner	12 February 1998
A series of muggings on a local estate leads Proctor and Carver to the house of a rather unusual couple.
18	"Solicitous"	Jeremy Swift guest stars	Mike Vardy	Julian Perkins	13 February 1998
Meadows and Skase discover a modern-day Robin Hood robbing the rich in Sun Hill.
19	"A Rainy Night in Sun Hill"	Jean Heywood and Flaminia Cinque guest star	Albert Barber	Len Collin	17 February 1998
Santini is irritated at being paired with Hollis on a cold, wet night in Canley.
20	"Unwarranted"	Charmian May guest stars	Mike Vardy	Simon Moss	19 February 1998
While in a rush to catch a crook, Ashton trips and falls foul of the law.
21	"A Bit of Respect"	Pip Torrens, Kathryn Pogson and Nick Miles guest star	Roger Gartland	Renny Krupinski	20 February 1998
Ackland sets out to trap a man who wants to take the law into his own hands. Notes: Nick Miles would join the cast as Chief Superintendent Guy Mannion in 1999.
22	"The Parent Trap"	Final appearance of WDC Suzi Croft; Jennifer Hennessy and Eric Allan guest star	Gill Wilkinson	Ray Brooking	24 February 1998
Croft is puzzled by a couple who want their daughter arrested.
23	"Sudden Death"	Tim Bentinck guest stars	Mike Vardy	Kathrine Smith	26 February 1998
Ackland and Quinnan are on the case when a man falls from his bedroom window; was it an accident or deliberate?
24	"Back-Up"	Richard Janes guest stars	Simon Massey	Graham Mitchell	27 February 1998
Carver is let down by an unreliable snout and needs Beech to get him out of a tricky situation.
25	"A Little Help"	Kellie Bright, John Marquez and Robert Beck guest star	Tom Cotter	Candy Denman	3 March 1998
Rawton and Skase realise they may be onto a serial attacker.
26	"Guiding Hand"	Vicki Pepperdine guest stars	Justin Hardy	Lyndon Mallet	5 March 1998
Page and McCann investigate what appears to be a straightforward case of attempted child abduction.
27	"Good Faith: Part 1"	Hugh Laurie, Leslie Grantham and Pete Lee-Wilson guest star	Ian White	Chris Ould	6 March 1998
A clever lawyer runs rings around Beech in court in a case involving a notorious robber.
28	"Good Faith: Part 2"	Leslie Grantham and Joel Beckett guest star	Ian White	Chris Ould	10 March 1998
The tit-for-tat violence escalates between rival gangs in Sun Hill.
29	"Good Faith: Part 3"	Leslie Grantham and Pete Lee-Wilson guest star	Ian White	Chris Ould	12 March 1998
Beech's involvement with rival racketeers becomes more complicated.
30	"No Doubt About It"	—	Simon Massey	Nigel Baldwin	13 March 1998
A hungover Garfield injures a member of the public during the pursuit of a burglar, but Monroe is sceptical of Garfield's motives when he names a potential suspect.
31	"One of the Gang"	Cyril Nri and Joseph Kpobie guest star	N. G. Bristow	Stephen Plaice	17 March 1998
Meadows and Daly get a tip-off about a gang of young muggers, but their information comes from an unlikely source. Notes: Cyril Nri would join the cast as Superintendent Adam Okaro in 2002.
32	"Without a Prayer"	Bruce Byron guest stars	Brian Farnham	Nigel Smith	19 March 1998
Garfield and Keane try to discover the cause of death of a woman found dead in a church hall.
33	"Lucky Find"	Andy Smart guest stars	Brian Farnham	Jaden Clark	20 March 1998
When a girl goes missing by the river, Deakin sees an opportunity to nail an old adversary.
34	"A Little Bit of Paradise"	Malcolm Terris guest stars	Dominic Lees	Rod Lewis	24 March 1998
McCann is sent in search of a valuable exotic bird.
35	"Daydream Believer"	David Spinx and Jan Pearson guest star	Ged Maguire	Ann Coburn	26 March 1998
Rawton and Daly investigate an assault on a resident of an old people's home.
36	"Powder My Nose"	Barbara Kellerman guest stars	Albert Barber	Jason Sutton	27 March 1998
Conway is the target of a blackmail attempt following a drunken night out.
37	"Bad Feelings"	Malcolm Tierney and Natasha Little guest star	Dominic Lees	Peter J. Hammond	31 March 1998
Boulton is after a villain known to have an eye for the ladies.
38	"Like Family"	Steve Steen and Zoot Money guest star	Derek Lister	Bridget Lawless	2 April 1998
Quinnan and Blake search for a missing French au pair who has been moonlighting as a stripper.
39	"Shattered"	Cliff Parisi guest stars	John Bruce	Hugh Ellis	3 April 1998
Cryer attends the death of a teenage girl and is subject to a complaint by the grieving father.
40	"Home Movie"	Tim Woodward, Jimi Mistry and Albert Welling guest star	Sarah Harding	Tom Needham	7 April 1998
Boyden uncovers an illicit pornographic video operation.
41	"Racer"	Leo Gregory and Jonathan Bennett guest stars	John Bruce	Ben Cooper	9 April 1998
Ashton tries to help a reformed teenage joyrider.
42	"The Scent of Compassion"	Jeremy Young and Ken Hutchison guest star	Jeremy Silberston	Stephen McGann	10 April 1998
Ashton's sense of compassion is crucial in solving a cruel assault case.
43	"Driving Me Crazy"	Kevin Bishop and Sean Blowers guest star	Tom Cotter	Matthew Leys	14 April 1998
Quinnan and Ackland lose a dangerous driver in pursuit and are later called to a fatal hit-and-run. Is there a connection between the two incidents?
44	"Manhunt"	Fish and Dicken Ashworth guest star	Steve Shill	Tony Mulholland	16 April 1998
Deakin and Carver investigate a case of male rape.
45	"Rebel Without a Licence"	Enn Reitel and Terence Wilton guest star	Delyth Thomas	Chris Jury	17 April 1998
A speeding Pontiac and three ageing James Deans give Stamp and McCann a headache.
46	"Sale or Return: Part 1"	Clive Merrison and Ishia Bennison guest star	Chris Lovett	Julian Spilsbury	21 April 1998
Boulton and Carver head for the river, chasing a particularly slippery customer.
47	"Sale or Return: Part 2"	Clive Merrison and Ishia Bennison guest star	Chris Lovett	Julian Spilsbury	23 April 1998
Boulton and Carver continue their investigation into illegal immigration and find the case complicated by an attractive woman.
48	"Target Man"	Sara Stockbridge guest stars	Tom Cotter	Stephen McAteer	24 April 1998
While football fever grips Sun Hill, Deakin hopes to get his man by following a tip-off. With Hollis to help him, how can he fail?
49	"Mixed Feelings"	Renu Setna and Peter Ferdinando guest star	Gill Wilkinson	Kumari Salgado	28 April 1998
Page tries to trace the mother of an abandoned baby, while Boulton and Rawton investigate an apparently racially motivated attack.
50	"Wannabe"	Serretta Wilson guest stars	Delyth Thomas	Wendy Lee	30 April 1998
Skase is sceptical of a 14-year-old girl so smitten with him that she accuses her parents of being drug dealers.
51	"One Small Step"	Chloe Newsome and Stanley Lebor guest star	Christopher Hodson	Rod Beacham	5 May 1998
Ashton, on his first solo outing, is distracted by a decoy while a nearby shop is burgled.
52	"Big Brother"	First appearance of WPC Vicky Hagen; Tim Barlow guest stars	Jo Shoop	Scott Cherry	7 May 1998
Boyden introduces the relief to new Area Car driver Vicky Hagen, but her reputation takes an immediate blow when Jarvis reveals she grassed on a friend of his at another station.
53	"Volcano"	Final appearance of PC Mike Jarvis	Jo Shoop	Scott Cherry	8 May 1998
Despite knowing the animosity between Jarvis and Hagen, Cryer pairs them in the area car on her first day, but Jarvis dubs her a "stupid cow" on the radio after she loses a suspect, putting his career and a potential transfer to the Diplomatic Protection Group at risk.
54	"Money Talks"	Lucy Robinson guest stars	Jo Johnson	Simon Moss	12 May 1998
Boyden gets friendly with Ashton's mother.
55	"Brighton Rocks: Part 1"	Sally Dexter, Robin Kermode and Ralph Nossek guest star	Ian White	Richard McBrien	14 May 1998
Beech wangles an expenses-paid trip to Brighton with Skase, but his night does not go as planned.
56	"Brighton Rocks: Part 2"	Sally Dexter and Robin Kermode guest star	Ian White	Richard McBrien	15 May 1998
Skase persuades Brighton CID to help track down the missing Beech.
57	"The Hare and the Tortoise"	—	Roger Gartland	Candy Denman	19 May 1998
Stamp and Hagen clash over what makes a good area car driver.
58	"The Better Man"	Kieran O'Brien guest stars	Jo Johnson	J.C. Wilsher	21 May 1998
Daly and Carver try to get evidence against a young drug addict suspected of brutally assaulting a police officer.
59	"Red Herrings"	Ron Moody guest stars	Gill Wilkinson	Terry Hodgkinson	22 May 1998
Carver and Proctor respond to a tip-off about the theft of some fish.
60	"Under the Grill"	Steven Hartley, Pippa Haywood and Kim Taylforth guest stars	Derek Lister	Stephen Plaice	26 May 1998
Boulton is less than thrilled to be placed on an interviewing course with Hollis, but gets the chance to exact revenge on an ex-colleague. Notes: Steven Hartley would join the cast as Superintendent Tom Chandler in 2000.
61	"The Stork"	Patrick Drury guest stars	Danny Hiller	Louise Hide	28 May 1998
Keane and Garfield look into allegations that a New Age cult leader is encouraging underage girls to engage in sexual activity.
62	"One of Us"	Kevin Doyle and Louise Delamere guest star	Clive Fleury	Katharine Way	29 May 1998
Carver is shocked when a woman names his friend from a neighbouring station as a flasher.
63	"Room to Manoeuvre"	Stephen Graham guest stars	Steve Shill	Patrick Melanaphy	2 June 1998
Boulton and Hollis find themselves in pursuit of the same villain.
64	"Out of Hand"	Tracey Childs, Valentine Nonyela and Peter Halliday guest star	John Bruce	Len Collin	4 June 1998
Santini and Keane investigate a mysterious assault.
65	"Watching the Detectives"	Hour-long episode; Bernard Gallagher and Christopher Bowen guest star	Ged Maguire	Graham Mitchell	5 June 1998
Rawton and Deakin investigate the mysterious disappearance of a woman who has been campaigning to free her husband from jail.
66	"A People Person"	Final appearance of DC Tosh Lines; David Hargreaves, Cheryl Hall and Stuart Organ guest star	N.G. Bristow	J.C. Wilsher	9 June 1998
Lines, on attachment with the Coroner's Office, pairs with Ackland to investigate the death of an old acquaintance in the apartment of his mistress.
67	"Spray"	Nicky Henson and Frank Harper guest star	Peter Cregeen	Nigel Baldwin	16 June 1998
Harker rushes to the aid of a woman in danger, but gets himself into trouble over his use of CS spray.
68	"Three Cheers"	Danny Webb and Arthur White guest star	Ged Maguire	Julian Perkins	19 June 1998
Hollis goes from a hero to a laughingstock when he arrests a notorious cat burglar before receiving an official complaint for throwing his lunch into a nearby garden. When the burglar asks to be interviewed by Hollis, he senses a chance to shut his mocking colleagues up.
69	"Up for Trouble"	Ursula Holden-Gill guest stars	Peter Lydon	Julian Perkins	23 June 1998
Hollis is due to collect his commendation, but his colleagues know he doesn't deserve one.
70	"The Bus Driver's Prayer"	Nicola Stapleton and Martin Kemp guest star	Clive Fleury	Dom Shaw	25 June 1998
Page is shocked when a man shows up at the front desk armed with a gun, claiming to have shot a man and left him for dead.
71	"Loving Memory"	Oliver Smith and Karen Meagher guest star	John Bruce	Dale Overton	26 June 1998
Cryer reopens an unsolved case in response to an attempted suicide.
72	"Stop"	Kate Maravan, Polly James and Roy Skelton guest star	Paul Murton	James Astbury	1 July 1998
Boulton suspects that Hollis is involved in a series of burglaries.
73	"Deep Secret"	Hour-long episode; Roy Hudd, Tamzin Malleson and James Ottaway guest star	Tom Cotter	Terry Hodgkinson	2 July 1998
Garfield teams up with an attractive young journalist when the wreckage of a World War II Spitfire is discovered in Sun Hill.
74	"The Whip Hand"	Final appearance of WPC Norika Datta; Nina Wadia and Polly Irvin guest star	Christopher Hodson	Manjit Singh	9 July 1998
Datta pairs with Quinnan to investigate a case of domestic abuse, and receives a surprise offer from Monroe.
75	"Bang!"	Richard Hawley and Nathan Constance guest star	Tom Cotter	Chris Ould	10 July 1998
Harker and Keane's failure to properly search a prisoner leads to them being held at gunpoint in custody with Boyden.
76	"Unlicensed"	Ralph Ineson, Sarah Smart and Matthew Cottle guest star	Peter Cregeen	Alison Fisher	14 July 1998
Skase and Rawton investigate a woman's claims that she is being harassed by a former lover.
77	"Vacant Possession"	John Duttine and Sharon Duce guest star	Jeremy Silberston	David Hoskins	16 July 1998
Boyden and Page investigate a death from asphyxiation and try to establish whether the paving stone placed on his chimney was an act of murder.
78	"Sucking Eggs"	Liz Smith guest stars	Peter Lydon	Ray Brooking	17 July 1998
Beech and Carver investigate the theft of a grandfather clock.
79	"Tainted Love: Part 1"	Gerard Horan guest stars	Jo Shoop	Clive Dawson	21 July 1998
Page is on top of the world as she moves out of the section house and finds a boyfriend, unaware he has a criminal history.
80	"Tainted Love: Part 2"	Gerard Horan guest stars	Jo Shoop	Clive Dawson	23 July 1998
Boulton asks Page to spy on her own boyfriend.
81	"Tainted Love: Part 3"	Gerard Horan guest stars	Jo Shoop	Clive Dawson	24 July 1998
Feeling she has wrecked Boulton's operation, how can Page continue her relationship with Danny?
82	"Cooking"	Final appearance of DS Alistair Greig	Sarah Harding	John Pollock	28 July 1998
Greig's request for tenure is rejected. He distracts himself by pairing with Deakin to investigate allegations by a prisoner that his recently released cellmate is dealing drugs.
83	"Fighting Chance"	Francis Magee guest stars	Martin Hutchings	Kevin Scouler	30 July 1998
Garfield and Quinnan fear for the safety of a boxer who has disappeared, abandoning his young son.
84	"King of the Road"	—	Tom Cotter	Ben Cooper	4 August 1998
Hollis suggests using an old caravan as a mobile police station.
85	"Wrong Place, Wrong Time"	—	Martin Hutchings	Michael Jenner	6 August 1998
Hagen and Harker have to contend with an unreliable witness.
86	"One Man, Two Faces"	Joseph Marcell guest stars	Paul Murton	Tunde Babalola	11 August 1998
McCann and Santini fall out over a vicious assault on a black youth.
87	"Shoot the Messenger"	Grant Masters and Jane Slavin guest star	Roger Gartland	Alan Pollock	13 August 1998
Boulton is kidnapped by an aggrieved ex-con.
88	"Too Little, Too Late"	Last episode in half-hour format	Marcus D. F. White	David Hoskins	20 August 1998
Skase and Daly investigate an assault outside a gay club, but a key witness is reluctant to come forward.
89	"Deep End"	90-minute special, first appearance of WPC Rosie Fox; Hywel Simons guest stars	Ian White	Elizabeth-Anne Wheal	25 August 1998
When a body is washed up on the bank of the Thames, Rawton realises that she was a friend of one of her informants, who has been providing information about a local brothel being run by a nasty pimp. Santini falls for new WPC Rosie Fox on her first day at Sun Hill, but rather than being up front, he constantly undermines her as they are asked to go undercover as a prostitute and her ex-boyfriend. Deakin is livid when he discovers CID has stumbled into a surveillance op attempting to catch a major drug dealer, but he decides to keep the op running; will it backfire on him and the inexperienced Santini and Fox?
90	"The Party's Over"	First regular episode in hour-long format; David Dayan Fisher guest stars	Jo Johnson	Elizabeth-Anne Wheal (Part 1); Neil Clarke (Part 2)	27 August 1998
This episode was originally written in two-halves. Part One: The owner of the house used in Proctor and Skase's obbo of the brothel offers possible information about a betting shop robbery, but Skase isn't entirely convinced that he is kosher. Meanwhile, Santini tries to apologise to Fox for going too far against her wishes the night before, but she tells him to stay away from her, consulting a federation rep about Santini's attack on her. Part Two: Boulton and Rawton are on the tail of a violent thug who kicked a pensioner half to death for just £80. When Santini and Fox attend an RTA, they find a man in possession of the pensioner's bus pass, which gives Boulton an important lead to catching the culprit.
91	"Bang Bang, You're Dead"	David Dayan Fisher, Nimmy March and Jack McKenzie guest star	Paul Murton	Elizabeth-Anne Wheal (Part 1); Neil Clarke (Part 2)	28 August 1998
This episode was originally written in two-halves. Part One: Fox takes the day off with a migraine, but turns up for the relief's paintball charity challenge, where Santini continues to bully and humiliate her. Conway is angered when Hollis is elected as team leader for the ranks, but it's the relief who have more to worry about with a mystery game player called 'The Terminator'. Part Two: Boulton and Rawton have their prime suspect Michael Sourby in court for attacking the pensioner, but during an interval, he attacks a security guard and manages to escape. Hagen and Page chase him into an abandoned care home, where he takes an unsuspecting Fox hostage, and it's up to Santini to protect her from harm.
92	"Team Spirit"	Final regular appearance of WPC Rosie Fox	Albert Barber	Elizabeth-Anne Wheal	1 September 1998
Fox decides that enough is enough, and after meeting with her federation rep, makes an official complaint about Santini. Rawton decides to do some digging on Fox's behalf to find out whether or not Santini has a history, while Boyden digs into Fox's record in an attempt to discredit her. Rawton and Fox go to see an ex-colleague of Santini's, who also made a sexual harassment complaint against him. Meanwhile, Boyden discovers that Fox has made complaints about three of her former colleagues while at Hendon. Quinnan questions Santini's motives and offers to play matchmaker, but when he realises that Santini isn't as innocent as he seems, he blurts out that Santini let Fox down during the rooftop showdown the day before.
93	"Urgent Assistance"	—	Albert Barber	Steve Griffiths	15 September 1998
Stamp is annoyed when he fails to beat Hagen and Hollis to a number of calls despite having control of the area car. When an urgent assistance call comes through on the radio from Page, he, Quinnan and Ashton race to the scene. However, when his route is blocked by a lorry parked in the middle of the road, Stamp is forced to reverse the car down a one-way street. In the heat of the moment, he fails to see a pedestrian who steps out from the side of the road into his path. When the pedestrian dies of injuries sustained in the crash, Stamp is informed he will be prosecuted for death by dangerous driving. He is then paired with Hagen as crew for the area car when a young boy goes missing from home.
94	"Taking Sides"	Final appearance of WPC Debbie Keane; Lesley Nicol, Charmian May and Ray Panthaki guest star	Tania Diez	Len Collin (Part 1); Colin Wyatt (Part 2)	22 September 1998
This episode was originally written in two-halves. Part One: Stamp attends the funeral of the pedestrian he knocked over, but he receives a less-than-warm reception. Later, he and Quinnan arrest the driver of a cut-and-shut limousine and end up taking a bride to her wedding. Meanwhile, Hagen and McCann deal with a group of underage drinkers at a local pub, but when they return, they take Ashton hostage. Part Two: Page is in court for the sentencing of Catherine Harrison, a persistent offender who has burgled an old lady whilst she was on holiday. When her son is accused of theft at a children's home, Stamp and Ashton pursue him to the court, only to watch his mother receive a custodial sentence.
95	"Deadly Impact"	Samantha Bond guest stars	Ged Maguire	Anthony Valentine	29 September 1998
It's Stamp's big day in court, and despite the fact that Quinnan has been called as a prosecution witness against him, his barrister is confident he will be found not guilty. When a witness to the incident is pulled apart for exaggerating the facts, Stamp realises that his chances of being found innocent are greater than he first thought. Ashton, his key defence witness, suffers a bout of nerves after advice from Hollis, but after conferring with Quinnan, manages to stay firm and keep the jury on side, while Conway is called as a character witness. Can his colleagues save his career, or are his years of loyal service going to be snuffed out by a guilty verdict?
96	"Big Day"	Christopher Timothy, Samantha Bond and Melanie Kilburn guest star	Marcus White	Nicholas McInerny (Part 1); Carolyn Sally Jones (Part 2)	6 October 1998
This episode was originally written in two-halves. Part One: Beech and Conway attend a police event to receive medals for long-standing service and excellent conduct. Beech is surprised to find that an old flame of his has defected to CIB, and is currently investigating one of the officers with whom he trained at Hendon. Anxious to get to the bottom of the investigation, Beech questions his old friend on details of his misgivings. Part Two: Stamp's day to face the police disciplinary board has arrived, but after seeing one of his old friends from Stafford Row being sacked for a minor driving offence, he does a runner. Garfield has to convince him to face the board to clear his conscience once and for all.
97	"Making Up"	Tam Dean Burn guest stars	Brian Parker	Chris McWaters	13 October 1998
Hagen goes undercover as a prostitute to trap a solicitor who has been selling forged passports to his clients, and a violent thug whom he helped escape bail. Skase takes a number of faked surveillance pictures of Hagen and Harker doing a 'drug deal', but when Harker and McCann stop the solicitor for jumping a red light, Deakin is furious that they may have blown the obbo. However, the solicitor fails to recognise Harker, and the deal goes ahead as planned. Meanwhile, Stamp gets behind the wheel of the area car for the first time since the fatal accident, hoping to put recent events behind him, but the victim's girlfriend isn't about to let him forget the incident, starting a campaign of intimidation against him.
98	"The Cross"	First appearance of WDC Kerry Holmes	Ian White	Maxwell Young	20 October 1998
Boulton is paired with new DC Kerry Holmes to investigate a gang who have been purchasing bikes with cheques stolen in an armed robbery. Boulton is keen to speak to Michael Duggan, a prime target that has evaded his capture for some time. Duggan, however, offers Boulton a deal - his brother-in-law, Sean Massey, is involved in a highly lucrative drug deal, and he knows the time, location, and other parties involved. Boulton arranges a sting to catch the dealer red-handed. However, Duggan does a runner with the money that Massey is due to hand over, and the dealer claims that Massey was told by his brother to plant the drugs on him. Holmes, however, has an idea on how to unravel the situation.
99	"Cast No Shadow/Betrayal"	Return of now-DCI Frank Burnside; Stephen Greif guest stars	Chris Lovett	Steve Griffiths and Tony Mulholland	27 October 1998
100	"Cast No Shadow/Betrayal"	Return of now-DCI Frank Burnside; Stephen Greif guest stars	Chris Lovett	Steve Griffiths and Tony Mulholland	29 October 1998
Part One: Boulton investigates when a young girl is approached and attacked on the way home from school. Her father, a property developer, has been having trouble with a gang involved in a pub protection racket. Unable to locate the prime suspect, Michael Hyde, Boulton poses as a competition representative to get the location from his wife. He and Carver travel up to Manchester on Hyde's trail. When they run into trouble at a local pub, they find themselves being rescued by none other than Frank Burnside, who left Sun Hill in mysterious circumstances five years ago. Burnside, who is actually undercover, tries to inadvertently help his former colleagues to find and capture Hyde, but the plan goes awry. Part Two: Boulton and Carver return to Sun Hill with Burnside in handcuffs, but upon their arrival, are pursued by two gunmen who try to make sure that Burnside doesn't spill the beans on Hyde's operation. Meadows discovers that Burnside has been working under cover with the Yard, and decides that they must work together to get a result. Burnside manages to set up a meeting with a major Croatian drug importer, just as Michael Hyde planned to do. However, when his brother, Mark, works out what Burnside is up to, a standoff involving Burnside and his girlfriend ensues, and tragedy strikes. Burnside is then offered a job with the crime OCCU, and informs Meadows they will be seeing more of each other.
101	"All for One"	Craig Fairbrass and Tony Osoba guest star	Delyth Thomas	Edward Canfor-Dumas	30 October 1998
Santini is first on the scene of a serious car accident, and becomes a bit of a local hero when he bravely dives into the river to secure the car, which is teetering on the edge. However, the driver reveals to him that upon his possession, he has a bag of cocaine, a present for his mistress. He asks Santini to destroy it if he doesn't make it. Santini manages to take possession of the bag when he recovers his personal affairs at the mortuary, but when Stamp and Garfield inadvertently discover Santini's misgivings, it's not long before they realise that their fellow officer may be playing for the other side. Harker is on the fence when Santini gives him a cock and bull story about the situation.
102	"Trial Run"	Rupert Holliday-Evans and Daisy Beaumont guest star	Dominic Lees	Patrick Melanaphy	3 November 1998
Skase calls in sick so he can moonlight as a bodyguard. He is charged with providing protection for the two teenage sons of a very wealthy Asian aristocrat. During a shopping trip, one of his teenage charges does a runner, taking his Mercedes with him. When Harker and Page spot the vehicle travelling at high speed, Skase is nearly caught out. However, when he discovers that the boy is hiding out at a nearby drug den, he arrives to find Boulton ready to raid the joint. Forced to explain the situation, Skase enlists Boulton to help him recover the boy without blowing the operation, and in turn, Skase manages to pinpoint the location of the dealer's stash.
103	"Section F"	Becky Hindley and Rick Warden guest star	Chris Hodson	Richard Stoneman	6 November 1998
Meadows and Conway are both up for promotion against each other, and with an impending inspection from Area, both are out to impress. However, there are some comic and some life-threatening repercussions for them both. Firstly, Quinnan and Garfield deliberately ruin the late turn parade, lding Skase into hot water, and he and Quinnan nearly come to blows in front of Brownlow. Meanwhile, Sgt Lamont is dealing with a troublesome prisoner in custody, who keeps flooding the toilets. Conway tries to lend a hand, but this only leads to further disasters. A young boy is then held hostage by an escaped prisoner who is armed, and Conway, against instructions, goes it alone to try to secure the boy's safety.
104	"Bad Chemistry"	Iddo Goldberg, Victor McGuire and Aden Gillet guest star	Rob Evans	Maxwell Young	10 November 1998
Holmes investigates when a woman is attacked in her flat and left for dead in a particularly violent domestic violence case. She initially suspects that the woman's landlord, Jake Morgan, is responsible for the attack, but when she catches the woman having a row with her husband, she arrests him for criminal damage, unaware that she has inadvertently jeopardised a surveillance operation on a major drugs dealer. As the Merseyside area drugs become involved, Holmes manages to locate the factory where the drugs are being produced, but a sting set up to catch the villains in the act takes an unexpected turn when they become involved in a violent shootout, and a young boy and his mum are taken hostage.
105	"Dog Eat Dog"	Michelle Gomez and Caroline Milmoe guest star	Phillipa Langdale	Rod Lewis	13 November 1998
Cryer attends the scene when a prostitute is slashed across the face with a machete and subsequently hospitalised. The prime suspect, Alvin Morton, was released from prison just ten days previously, and Cryer is determined to send him back there. Meanwhile, when the prostitute retracts her statement, and Alvin's girlfriend provides him with an alibi, Santini mishandles the situation and gives Alvin's location to two of her friends who have vowed revenge on her attacker. When Alvin is shot and doubly kneecapped, Cryer is curious to learn just how they found out where Alvin was staying. A box of matches with Alvin's address written on it then surfaces during interview, landing Santini in deep trouble.
106	"Indiscretion"	Peter-Hugo Daly, Edna Doré and Linal Haft guest star	Derek Lister	Arthur Ellis	17 November 1998
Skase attends the scene of a fire at a 'sex cinema' club, where a reportedly angry punter set the club alight after being refused entry. However, it later transpires that the culprit caught two foreign men watching a police interview tape of his girlfriend, aged twelve, who was being interviewed over sexual assault claims made against her godfather. Assigned to investigate, Rawton teams up with a DS from the Child Protection Unit, and the pair try to find out how a number of police evidence tapes have managed to worm their way out for general consumption. Skase isn't convinced that the manager of the club is telling the whole truth, while Rawton investigates a dodgy practice lawyer who copied the tapes.
107	"The Rate for the Job"	Lesley Dunlop guest stars	Frank Smith	J.C. Wilsher	20 November 1998
Meadows asks Deakin to have more of a 'hands-on' approach after a row erupts between Beech and Daly. All three of the CID sergeants, meanwhile, are having problems. Daly's operation into a known stolen goods handler is blown when Carver spooks the suspect by accident. Boulton has had word that a known criminal who is due for sentencing in just two days plans to do a final job in order to tide him over whilst he is inside. However, his snout is cornered by the suspect, and the gang arrive at the planned location, only to give Boulton the eye that they are onto him. Lastly, Beech is troubled when an old flame offers him £3,000 to reveal details of an investigation into her current boyfriend by Daly.
108	"For Interest Only"	Mark Monero guest stars	John Bruce	Don Webb	24 November 1998
Brownlow is angered when a local journalist approaches him following the publication of an article in the CPS journal regarding an unsolved case from twenty years previously. The case in question, an armed jewellery robbery, saw prime suspect Ray Catton imprisoned for the death of his two accomplices, but the loot remains unfound. Meanwhile, the man's daughter is being hassled by a loan shark, desperate for the repayment of the money she owes him. When Catton has a heart attack, he decides to reveal the location of the loot on his deathbed, unaware that his brother has returned to the country with the same purpose. Brownlow is determined to find and recover the loot before Catton's brother does.
109	"The Fat Lady Sings"	First appearance of DC Duncan Lennox; Annette Badland guest stars	Robert Del Maestro	Richard Stoneman	27 November 1998
Quinnan ignores a plea for help from a mysterious opera singer whilst out on patrol, but later regrets his actions and ignores a number of shouts whilst trying to find her. Meanwhile, Holmes is dealing with a personal request from Brownlow, who has been asked by a local judge to investigate a number of threatening letters sent to him. Holmes and Quinnan soon come to realise that they are chasing the same criminal. A new face at Sun Hill is causing quite a stir in the form of Scottish DC Duncan Lennox, who offers to provide Holmes assistance on the case after she discovers he has a personal acquaintance with the judge. A showdown at a local opera house goes awry when Stamp bursts in unexpectedly.
110	"Too Many Cooks"	Isla Blair, Flora Montgomery, Adrian Pang and Anthony Valentine guest star	James Cellan Jones	Nigel Baldwin	1 December 1998
Monroe is called to deal with a complaint against an officer from Stafford Row, where the victim has accused him of offering acquittal in return for sex. Meanwhile, Brownlow attends a charity dinner held by the Sun Hill Businessman's Association. When the daughter of a very prominent community figure disappears, Brownlow urges CID to make it their top priority. Meanwhile, Monroe's suspect is brought in by McCann and Hagen for harassment. When the suspect reveals information about the woman's disappearance, Monroe realises that the two events are connected, which subsequently leads him into conflict within the Chinese community, as well as a murky world of drugs, vice, corruption, and violence.
111	"Team Play"	Debbie Chazen, Nancy Carroll and Enzo Cilenti guest star	Gwennan Sage	Anthony Valentine	4 December 1998
Rawton and Lennox investigate when a nurse is violently attacked at the nurse's home where she is living. Initially, only one witness is able to place anyone near the scene of the crime, but Lennox is determined not to have to rely on the victim to pick him out. However, Lennox seems doomed to fail as he has to take a safety training course with Meadows and a group from the relief. Proctor takes over and immediately heads straight to the victim for information. Lennox continues to try to sneak away from the training exercise to continue working on the case. After the suspect continues to play games in the interview room, he then adds assaulting a police officer to his charge sheet when he attacks Ackland.
112	"Heat and Light"	Stephen Marcus, Allie Byrne and Alex McSweeney guest star	Ged Maguire	Gregory Evans	8 December 1998
Boulton and Holmes investigate the latest in a long line of arson attacks. When forensic evidence places teen tearaway Adam Marrs at the scene of a previous fire, he is questioned and confesses to all of the recent attacks. However, a profiler brought in by Deakin to assist on the case isn't so sure that Marrs is responsible for the latest fire. Investigations reveal that the security guard on duty at the time was actually away from his post, moonlighting for another firm. When it is revealed that he abducted and tried to rape a young girl at the property, his evidence is discounted. Deakin's profiler seems to think that a serving fireman is responsible, but will her theory be proved right? Boulton isn't entirely convinced.
113	"Ticking Clocks"	Holly Davidson, Allie Byrne and Christopher Guard guest star	Barbara Rennie	Gregory Evans	10 December 1998
Boulton and Holmes deal with the abduction of a newborn baby from his hospital bed. CCTV of the abductor reveals little clues as to her identity, so Boulton asks Deakin if he can have the assistance of profiler to the stars, DS Viv Hunt. As the baby's grandfather reveals he has been having secret meetings with his daughter against his wife's wishes, the identity of the father is finally revealed in the form of the young girl's schoolteacher, Phillip Gough. Boulton initially suspects that Gough's wife might be the abductor, but further investigation leads him to suspect a housewife who recently had a miscarriage. Meanwhile, Meadows and Deakin organise a raid on a hoax caller who claimed to have information.
114	"Strange Bedfellows"	First appearance of DC Scott Henderson	Frank Smith	Len Collin	11 December 1998
Burnside arrives at Sun Hill with a well-known villain in tow, convicted child sex offender Carl Jones. Jones has been granted early parole on the basis that he should reveal the location of the body of a young boy who disappeared eight years previously, and also provide information on members of the gang who were responsible. Burnside initially suspects Jones is leading them a merry dance, so he decides to organise a meeting between Jones and the young boy's parents, in the hope that their pain and suffering will convince Jones to clear his conscience. A search of a nearby school grounds reveals the boy's remains, but Burnside is determined not to let Jones walk free without being made a spectacle of first.
115	"Live and Ticking"	—	Peter Cregeen	Candy Denman	15 December 1998
Hollis spots a gang of youths hanging around a phone box acting suspiciously. When he goes to investigate, the phone box explodes as a result of a volatile homemade bomb being planted inside. When a second bomb goes off at a nearby primary school, badly injuring a young boy, Brownlow and Hollis question the ringleader, who reveals that there are a total of ten bombs, which he has sold to his friends or classmates. Brownlow then demands Monroe set up a widescale operation to search for the remainder of the bombs. When one is found inside a boiler cupboard of a young boy living in a council block, Conway has trouble evacuating an agoraphobic resident. When Hollis finally catches up with the culprit, he reveals he has one more bomb.
116	"All the Lonely People"	Trevor Martin guest stars	Delyth Thomas	Tony Mulholland	17 December 1998
Rawton goes undercover as a lonely heart to find a possible serial killer who has claimed three victims. The only person who can identify the possible culprit is a flaky chef whose description of the assailant is less than clear-cut. When Rawton's second date is identified as the man who was with the third victim on the night she disappeared, she tries to plug him for information as to the motive for his crimes. However, when the second victim turns up alive and well, suspicions start to fall on whether or not the three victims are connected. When the boyfriend of the third victim is discovered to have used and abused prostitutes, it looks less and less likely that a serial killer is at large, until Rawton's date abducts her.
117	"The Personal Touch"	Leslie Grantham, Denise van Outen, Alex Ferns, Trevor Byfield and Chris Simmons guest star	Ian White	Patrick Melanaphy	18 December 1998
Beech is approached by gangster Jimmy Smith for a favour after his house is ransacked. However, when Jimmy's girlfriend is also attacked and ransacked in her home, Burnside arrives from the crime OCCU to take on the case. The latest burglaries are the work of a violent gang who have been operating up and down the country. The gang's vehicle is linked to David Evans, currently serving a prison sentence in Strangeways. Smith gets his son to plug Evans for information, and two members of the gang are identified. When Jimmy's girlfriend approaches Beech to say she has been having an affair with a member of the gang, Beech goes as far as to secretly attack Burnside in an attempt to cover up evidence. Notes: Chris Simmons would join the cast as DC Mickey Webb in 2000.
118	"Time, Gentlemen Please!"	Dominic Power guest stars	Albert Barber	Ray Brooking	21 December 1998
Daly and Rawton go undercover as the landlord and landlady of a local pub while investigating a gang who have been operating a protection racket on the local pubs and clubs. Daly befriends a small-time petty crook who offers him some dodgy gear on the sly. Meanwhile, Garfield is in court for the case of a shoplifter who assaulted him during the arrest. When the woman is cleared of the assault, Garfield is positive that one particular magistrate was responsible for the dismissal. When Conway invites her to spend a day on patrol with Garfield and McCann, Garfield loses his cool. As Daly and Rawton think they have lost their prime suspect, the crook who Daly has befriended manages to salvage a deal.
119	"Puzzled"	Lee Ingleby, Rebekah Gibbs, P. H. Moriarty and Katharine Schlesinger guest star	Steve Shill	Ben Cooper	22 December 1998
Quinnan investigates when his vet is forced to treat a dog that has been injected with heroin. Quinnan catches the owner in possession of cannabis, but he refuses to reveal how the dog was attacked. Meanwhile, Boulton has had word that a nasty pair of Turkish brothers are back in town. When Quinnan investigates a burglary at the address of the dog owner, he finds the owner in possession of a quantity of heroin stashed inside a plastic elephant. Boulton then discovers that his Turkish friends are the ones who want it back, so the pair set up a joint operation. Meanwhile, Hollis organises an inter-station pub quiz, and has trouble protecting the questions from the opposing teams and an opportunist thief.
120	"Christmas Star"	Emmanuel Petit and Bobby Knutt guest star	Tom Cotter	Terry Hodgkinson	24 December 1998
Santini and Page investigate when a young girl is knocked down in a hit-and-run incident. Santini manages to trace the owner of the car, but he denies all knowledge of the incident. Santini isn't convinced and decides to arrest him anyway. With the young girl recovering in hospital, Santini discovers she is a big fan of Arsenal FC, and in particular, Emmanuel Petit. Santini has a contact in the sports promotion industry and boasts that he can make a dream come true for the young girl by getting Petit to visit, but Page isn't sure he can deliver. Meanwhile, Stamp has the job of organizing the relief Christmas party, and finds a very cheap supplier for the booze, until he gets caught up in the middle of a Customs raid.
121	"S.A.D."	Peter Jones, Veronica Roberts and Judy Cornwell guest star	Chris Hodson	Chris Jury	31 December 1998
The relief return to work after the Christmas break, and find themselves with little to do. Meanwhile, Boyden receives a welcome visitor in the form of Mrs Bourne, who has cooked a batch of her locally famous mince pies for the relief. As shouts start coming through on CAD, Stamp and Page have to assist when Mrs Bourne is later found collapsed. A search of her house puts Boyden off mince pies for life. Hagen and McCann deal with a man whose old age dementia has led him to believe he lives at his previous address. Santini and Quinnan deal with a pregnant woman who has assaulted her husband, while Ashton and Harker find themselves being de-liced after bringing an unwelcome visitor to Sun Hill.
