= Always and Everyone =

- Series 1 (1999) Title Card
- Also known as: A&E
- Genre: Medical drama
- Created by: Stephen Butchard; Andy Macdonald
- Starring: Martin Shaw; Niamh Cusack; David Harewood; Esther Hall; Paul Warriner; David Partridge; Jane Slavin; Katie McEwen; Connor McIntyre; Kim Vithana; Dominic Mafham; Tamzin Malleson; Michael Kitchen; Jane Danson; Naomie Thompson
- Theme music composer: Tot Taylor
- Composers: Mark Sayer-Wade; Tolga Kashif
- Country of origin: United Kingdom
- Original language: English
- No. of series: 4
- No. of episodes: 40

Production
- Executive producers: Simon Lewis; Sita Williams; Hugh Warren; Andy Harries
- Producers: Francis Hopkinson; Pamela Wilson; David Boulter; Richard Broke
- Running time: 50 minutes
- Production company: Granada Television

Original release
- Network: ITV
- Release: 7 June 1999 – 22 August 2002

Always and Everyone (later known as A&E) is a British television medical drama, broadcast on ITV, that ran for four series between 7 June 1999 and 22 August 2002. Set in the Accident and Emergency department of St Victor's city hospital in Manchester (although some exterior scenes were filmed in Birmingham), the series follows the everyday lives of the doctors and nurses working in the department, and was heavily described as ITV's answer to Casualty, and the British equivalent of ER.

The series featured an ensemble cast; however, the principal characters, Robert Kingsford (Martin Shaw) and Christine Fletcher (Niamh Cusack), appeared throughout all four series. David Harewood, whose character, Mike Gregson, was credited as the third principal character, appeared throughout the first three series. The first series introduced a total of ten regular cast members and an additional ten recurring cast members. All ten regular cast members were also retained for the second series, and two additional regular characters, Andrew Argyle (Dominic Mafham) and Kate Brady (Tamzin Malleson), were introduced.

The third series saw a major overhaul in both cast and format, with the series being rebranded as A&E, a new theme being introduced to the opening titles, and storylines focusing more heavily on the inter-personal relationships among the hospital's staff members. Although all twelve regular cast members returned, by the end of the series, eight had departed, with many receiving much less screen time than in previous series. A new principal character, Jack Turner (Michael Kitchen), was introduced at the start of the series to act as a catalyst between Christine and Robert. Jane Danson was also introduced as a new regular character, Samantha Docherty.

Following the loss of a large chunk of the main cast, the fourth series saw the introduction of twelve new characters, including new senior doctors Ruth Cole (Jaye Griffiths) and Danny Barton (James Murray), with only four of the show's original stars returning. A largely critical reception for the new cast, coupled with declining viewing figures, was cited as the main reason for the show's axe. Forty episodes were broadcast across four series. The series has never been commercially released on either VHS or DVD, but, digital repeats of the series were broadcast on ITV Encore for the first time on 9 June 2014, and all four series were regularly repeated on a rotation basis until the channel was closed on 1 May 2018. All four series were also released as a box set on Sky Go in 2016.

== Cast ==
=== Main cast ===
- Martin Shaw as Mr. (later Prof.) Robert Kingsford, Head of Department/Clinical Consultant (Series 1–4)
- Niamh Cusack as Dr. Christine Fletcher, Senior House Officer/Consultant/Director of Critical Care (Series 1–4)
- David Harewood as Dr. Mike Gregson, Staff Grade (Series 1–3)
- Esther Hall as Dr. Louise Macken, Senior House Officer (Series 1–3)
- Paul Warriner as Dr. Stuart Phelan, Senior House Officer/Registrar (Series 1–3)
- David Partridge as Dr. David Scobie, Senior House Officer/Trauma Surgeon (Series 1–3)
- Jane Slavin as Cathy Jordan, Ward Sister (Series 1–3)
- Katie McEwen as Judy Enshaw, Ward Sister (Series 1–4)
- Connor McIntyre as Terry Harker, Charge Nurse (Series 1–4)
- Kim Vithana as Yvonne Silver, Ward Sister/Trauma Nurse (Series 1–3)
- Dominic Mafham as Dr. Andrew Argyle, Paediatrician (Series 2–3)
- Tamzin Malleson as Dr. Kate Brady, Senior House Officer (Series 2–3)
- Jane Danson as Samantha Docherty, Nurse Practitioner (Series 3–4)
- Michael Kitchen as Mr. Jack Turner, Trauma & Orthopaedic Surgeon (Series 3–4)
- Silas Carson as Dr. Raz Amin, Anaesthetist (Series 3)
- Jaye Griffiths as Dr. Ruth Cole, Senior House Officer (Series 4)
- James Murray as Dr. Danny Barton, Senior House Officer (Series 4)
- Michele Austin as Poppy Jonston, Ward Sister (Series 4)
- Don Gallagher as Dr. Jeffrey Drummond, Clinical Director (Series 4)
- Emily Hamilton as Dr. Saskia Walker, Senior House Officer (Series 4)
- Ben Taylor as Dr. James Da Costa, Registrar (Series 4)

=== Additional cast ===
- Con O'Neill as Kenny Fletcher, Relative (Series 1)
- Catherine Russell as Issy Howell, Relative (Series 1–2)
- Neal Trotman as Paul Gregson, Relative (Series 1–2)
- Leon Trotman as Richie Gregson, Relative (Series 1–2)
- Alan Williams as Martin McMad, Patient (Series 1–2)
- Andy Quine as Dale, Paramedic (Series 1–4)
- Naomie Thompson as Tricia, Paramedic (Series 1–4)
- Josh Moran as Josh, Paramedic (Series 1–3)
- Lisa Rigby as Jane, Paramedic (Series 2–3)
- Dean Williamson as Alan, Security Officer (Series 1–2)
- Bill Rodgers as Freddie, Security Officer (Series 1–2)
- Cathy Tyson as Stella Gregson, Relative (Series 2)
- John Lloyd Fillingham as Steve Moore, Relative (Series 3)
- Parminder Nagra as Sunita Verma, Hospital Café Staff (Series 4)
- Ronny Jhutti as Ajay Verma, Porter (Series 4)
- Bhasker Patel as Raj Verma, Hospital Café Manager (Series 4)
- Judy Holt as Jean Kenning, Receptionist (Series 4)
- Amanda Abbington as Tessa Bailey, Relative (Series 4)

== Episodes ==
Series	Episodes	First aired	Last aired
1	6	7 June 1999	12 July 1999
2	12	30 March 2000	22 June 2000
3	14	11 April 2001	12 July 2001
4	8	4 July 2002	22 August 2002

=== Series 1 (1999) ===
No.	Title	Directed by	Written by	Ratings (in millions)	Original release date
1	"Always and Everyone"	Simon Meyers	Stephen Butchard	9.05	7 June 1999
Christine is surprised to discover that the driver of a vehicle involved in a serious road traffic accident is none other than her husband, Kenny. David's first day at Saint Victor's goes from bad to worse when he is assaulted by a patient with mental difficulties. Louise is forced to make the tough decision to withdraw care for an elderly patient who is unable to breathe on his own. Stuart's ongoing dispute with his neighbours ends in disaster, and Mike's children try to encourage him to expand his social life.
2	"The Death Shift"	Simon Meyers	Stephen Butchard	7.76	14 June 1999
Mike deals with a suicidal man who refuses treatment that could potentially save his life, but Cathy sees it as the perfect opportunity for Mike to ask hospital psychiatrist Susan out on a date. Louise inadvertently puts a youngster at risk after misdiagnosing his condition as glandular fever, but Robert manages to use the situation to avoid Issy's latest scan. Christine continues to probe Kenny for information about his relationship with Mary. David has an interesting day dealing with a number of minor injuries.
3	"Long Gone"	Tim Whitby	Philip Gerard	7.70	21 June 1999
Robert battles to save the life of two road accident victims, one of whom is pregnant. Mike is grilled over his choice to continue treating a suicidal man who initially refused to be treated. Christine treats an accompanied prisoner complaining of strange symptoms, and discovers that his presence at the hospital is simply a ploy to allow his girlfriend to visit. Stuart's sister-in-law is admitted after a suspected mugging, but he begins to suspect that his brother could be subjecting her to a campaign of domestic violence.
4	"Strike Me Down"	Tim Whitby	Edel Brosnan	7.65	28 June 1999
Stuart is shaken when a brain haemorrhage patient he is treating suddenly deteriorates, after informing her parents that she is in recovery, but when he informs a heart transplant patient that the girl was carrying an organ card, Mike is forced to question his judgement. Louise's medical capabilities are called into question after orthopaedics make a complaint to Robert about the number of unnecessary referrals she is making, but when David tries to intervene and play the hero, his efforts are swiftly rebuffed.
5	"A Greater Sense of Degradation"	Nick Laughland	Sarah Louise-Hawkins	7.33	5 July 1999
With Robert away for the night, Mike is left in charge. When a local football team is admitted following a road accident, the team are rewarded with a free takeaway as a way of saying thank you. However, the celebration quickly turns sour when the takeaway results in an outbreak of food poisoning. David and Yvonne are left to run the department single-handed, and David uses the opportunity to prove himself. But when one of his former mentors is admitted as a result of a heroin overdose, his loyalties are tested.
6	"Due Dilligence"	Nick Laughland	Stephen Butchard	7.54	12 July 1999
When two gunshot victims are left outside A&E, Stuart is forced to leap into action, but despite Robert's best efforts, one of the victims dies of his injuries. Cathy and Louise deal with the father of a young girl who is killed in a road traffic accident. Stuart's brother decides to leave his wife and go on the run. David tries to advance his fledgling relationship with Yvonne. When Cathy tenders her resignation, Mike finally gets around to asking her out on a date. Christine decides to finally pluck up the courage to leave Kenny. Final appearance of Kenny Fletcher (Con O'Neill)

=== Series 2 (2000) ===
No.	Title	Directed by	Written by	Ratings (in millions)	Original release date
1	"Code of Conduct"	Nick Laughland	Stephen Butchard	8.10	30 March 2000
Christine's professional judgement is put to the test when a man with severe burns rejects urgent treatment. Stuart deals with a group of schoolchildren involved in a minibus accident, but inadvertently faces the wrath of one angry parent. Robert returns to A&E to show off newborn baby Harry, but ends up getting roped into dealing with two window cleaners involved in a serious accident. David continues to try to win Yvonne's affections, and Christine has a new admirer in the form of a new paediatric doctor, Andrew Argyle. First appearance of Dr. Andrew Argyle (Dominic Mafham)
2	"Outbreak"	Nick Laughland	Stephen Butchard	8.09	6 April 2000
A young female who arrives in the department complaining of abdominal pain is discovered to be pregnant, and with contractions well underway, Robert faces no choice but to deliver the baby himself. Terry consoles a young woman who is admitted after cutting her wrists. The department is thrown into turmoil when a patient is admitted covered in a mystery powder, forcing Resus to be put into quarantine. Christine receives a call from a friend at City General to inform her that Issy has been involved in a serious accident. Final appearance of Issy Howell (Catherine Russell)
3	"Cracking Under Pressure"	James Hawes	Edel Brosnan	7.92	13 April 2000
Robert returns to work, but begins to crack under the pressure. Christine deals with a young girl who has been hit by a bus, but denies the police access to the bus driver until she can determine the identity of a mystery substance found in the girl's bloodstream. Mike angers a young mother after accusing her of abusing her six-year-old daughter. A young girl with slash wounds to her wrists is found collapsed in reception, and Stuart takes a leap into the unknown by treating a trauma patient at the scene of a hit-and-run.
4	"A Blast from the Past"	David Tucker	Nicholas McInerny	7.36	20 April 2000
Christine is made acting consultant in Robert's absence. Mike battles to save the life of a drowned child, but the father's attempts to hide the truth surrounding the boy's accident make it harder for him to administer the correct treatment. Stuart and Louise deal with a case of domestic violence involving a severed finger. David's latest attempt to bring the department up to speed with cutting-edge technology leaves him with egg on his face, and Mike is shocked by the arrival of an unwelcome visitor: his ex-wife, Stella.
5	"Back to the Frontline"	James Hawes	Charlotte Jones	6.98	27 April 2000
Robert faces his first day back at work after Issy's death, but is confronted with a barrage of sympathy and criticism following his shaky treatment of an asthma patient. David misdiagnoses a woman suffering from abdominal pain, and when she is later found collapsed at home, Robert discovers that she is suffering from an ectopic pregnancy. David's day goes from bad to worse after he tries to make Martin see the error of his ways in spectacular fashion. Cathy finds herself being used as a go-between by Stella.
6	"Going for Gold"	David Tucker	Stephen Butchard	7.53	4 May 2000
David is forced to deliver heartbreaking news to regular patient Martin, after an X-ray discovers traces of a rare form of bone cancer. However, after his grilling from Robert, David realises that it could be make or break for his career in A&E, so he decides to pull out all the stops. Stuart is forced to confront his feelings for Mandy after she is assaulted by a drug smuggler. Mike manages to clear the air with Stella, while new doctor Kate Brady surprises Louise with her skillful treatment of a patient refusing to see a female doctor. First appearance of Dr. Kate Brady (Tamzin Malleson)
7	"Hunger"	Anthony Garner	Stephen Butchard	7.41	11 May 2000
Robert fears that he has lost his appetite for the job and turns to Christine for help. David is shocked when Martin passes away unexpectedly. Mike arranges for Stella to meet Paul and Richie for the first time in seven years. Kate struggles when faced with a patient who has suffered an ankle fracture in a car accident. Christine informs Andrew that she does not intend to pursue their relationship. Louise tackles a particularly difficult student whilst taking an educational course on the effects of road traffic accidents. Final appearance of Martin McMad (Alan Williams)
8	"A Taste of the Good Life"	Anthony Garner	Kate Brooke	7.54	18 May 2000
A busy Friday night shift ends in tragedy after two children involved in a car accident die shortly after their arrival at the hospital. The situation is intensified when Cathy discovers that the police officers who were first on the scene have misidentified one of the casualties. Meanwhile, Mike and Stella come head to head over his parenting skills, Robert struggles to juggle life as a single parent, Andrew offers to help David with a difficult young patient, and Louise and Stuart finally put their cards on the table.
9	"Mayday, Mayday"	James Hawes	Andy MacDonald	7.90	25 May 2000
Robert faces the challenge of his career when he leads a team to free the survivors of a horrific air crash. Among those trapped in the plane are a six-week-old baby, a seven-year-old schoolgirl, and a businesswoman suffering from an aortic rupture. While he tries to regain his passion for the job, Kate struggles to keep her emotions under control. Judy begins to question her future in A&E, and Andrew's efforts manage to impress Christine. David begins to buckle under the pressure, but manages to impress Robert.
10	"The Darkest Corners"	Ian Knox	Sarah-Louise Hawkins	7.96	1 June 2000
Christine tends to a boy injured in a fight, but during examination, she discovers injuries that suggest an involvement with child prostitution. Stuart tries to help a young mother whose baby is suffering from severe diarrhoea. David makes friends with a local busybody and ends up getting him volunteer work at the hospital. Mike continues to fight Stella for custody of the children. Louise tends to a young girl who has a blocked windpipe, but struggles to keep her mind on the job after discovering that she is pregnant by Stuart.
11	"A Day of Two Halves"	Alrick Riley	Kate Brooke	7.70	8 June 2000
Stuart tries to prevent a patient showing signs of mental difficulty from being assessed by a psychiatrist, but his day goes from bad to worse when he receives shocking news from Louise. Mike attends court for the first day of the custody battle, but finds himself becoming an unlikely ally for Stella when the pressure of the situation begins to take its toll on Richie. Freddie panics when he learns that he is to be promoted to supervisor. Christine is forced to confront Andrew after a young mother makes a complaint about him.
12	"Closed Doors"	Nick Laughland	Stephen Butchard	8.68	22 June 2000
When a busy night descends into chaos, Robert worries that his department cannot cope. Kate deals with an elderly patient who shows no signs of medical requirement, but is shocked when the woman unexpectedly dies whilst waiting to be transferred to a ward. Mike tries to persuade Cathy to leave with him for a new life in London. Robert deals with a car crash patient who is impaled on a fence post. Stuart tries to persuade Louise to give their relationship a try, and Terry ends up in a fight with a distressed relative. Final appearances of Stella Gregson (Cathy Tyson), Paul Gregson (Neal Trotman), Richie Gregson (Leon Trotman), Security Alan (Dean Williamson) and Security Freddie (Bill Rodgers)

=== Series 3 (2001) ===
No.	Title	Directed by	Written by	Ratings (in millions)	Original release date
1	"Med School Educate"	Peter Smith	Kate Brooke	7.77	11 April 2001
New nurse practitioner Samantha Docherty's first day goes from bad to worse when a man she met the night before whilst out clubbing is admitted to the hospital in the custody of two police officers. Christine's promotion to consultant, despite being endorsed by Robert, seriously upsets their relationship after she tries to persuade the father of a motorbike crash victim to honour his daughter's wishes by allowing her to be an organ donor. Stuart is shocked to discover that he could not be the father of Louise's baby. First appearances of Samantha Docherty (Jane Danson), Dr. Raz Amin (Silas Carson) and Mr. Jack Turner (Michael Kitchen)
2	"Battlefield"	Ian Knox	Kate Brooke	6.87	12 April 2001
Robert deals with a young schoolteacher who is admitted with a bout of severe vomiting, and discovers that he has inadvertently drunk industrial-strength weed killer, making his chances of survival very unlikely. Stuart tries to persuade Louise to move in with him. Jack tries to poach David from A&E to join him in surgery. Samantha refuses to take responsibility for a patient's collapse despite being his allocated practitioner. Robert notices Christine is pulling back from him emotionally and looks to Cathy for comfort.
3	"Straight from the Horse's Mouth"	Ian Knox	Chris Murray	7.33	19 April 2001
Louise and Stuart clash over the treatment of a potentially brain-dead patient, and the stress of the situation forces Christine to question Louise's ability to continue working during her pregnancy. Christine's relationship with Robert deteriorates, and she accuses him of siding with Jack over the dubious diagnosis of a patient admitted after falling from a motorway bridge. Kate receives a harsh warning from Robert after leaving a seriously ill patient to seek help. David plans a party for his last shift in the department. Final appearance of Dr. Louise Macken (Esther Hall)
4	"The Path of Progress"	Peter Smith	Stephen Butchard	7.62	26 April 2001
Jack is appointed clinical director over Robert, and immediately begins trying to get Christine on his side. Mike returns from London with the intention of getting his old job back. Robert deals with a twelve-year-old gunshot victim, and tries to persuade her father to tell the police who was responsible. Kate tries to prove herself to Christine whilst dealing with two firefighters injured during a building collapse. Stuart is devastated to discover that Louise is not coming back. Mike is furious when he catches Robert with Cathy. Return of Dr. Mike Gregson (David Harewood)
5	"A Place of Refuge"	Mary McMurray	Vicky Cleaver & Rachel Gretton	6.48	3 May 2001
Robert is outraged when Christine's efforts to stretch the department budget result in a heart attack patient suffering cardiac arrest. Mike deals with a young girl who has an allergic reaction to a tongue stud. Kate is caught moonlighting when a junkie that she treated the previous night turns up at the hospital begging for painkillers. Mike deals with a young woman suffering from abdominal pain, and suspects she may be suffering from an ectopic pregnancy. Christine asserts herself as Robert continues to undermine her.
6	"The Law of the Land"	David Skynner	Éanna Ó'Lochlainn	7.15	10 May 2001
In an effort to improve departmental relations, Andrew is sent out into the field with paramedics Trish and Brian. When the trio is called to a disused warehouse by an anonymous caller, Andrew becomes suspicious and decides to investigate. He finds a group of twelve illegal Eastern European immigrants trapped beneath a collapsed tower of building cargo, but discovers that the traffickers aren't prepared to let him call for help. As a hostage situation ensues, and Brian is shot, Andrew calls upon Jack for help.
7	"Safe from Harm"	Delyth Thomas	Kate Brooke	8.09	17 May 2001
Whilst performing an intubation, Stuart fails to notice that his patient has a recessive jaw, and ends up causing a loss of oxygen to his brain. The aftermath of the situation leads to a three-way split among Robert, Jack, and Christine on how to deal with the patient's angered relatives. Andrew questions his passion for the job after treating a teenage dancer with a fractured ankle, and Mike is shocked to discover that a fracture patient he has been treating, who shows signs of a possible tumour, is in fact Judy's father.
8	"Medicine, My Lawful Wife"	Delyth Thomas	Danny Miller	6.66	24 May 2001
Robert deals with a gunshot patient who is reluctant to reveal how he received his injuries. The team is angered by a new directive from management, which states that only registered consultants are allowed to carry out certain procedures. Stuart, believing his actions are responsible for the directive, is further angered when his treatment of a young rower is interrupted by Jack after he discovers that the boy is the son of a hospital trustee. Judy is devastated when her father unexpectedly dies on the operating table.
9	"One of Our Own"	David Tucker	Chris Fewtrell	6.85	31 May 2001
Kate and Andrew deal with a mother and daughter who are involved in a serious car accident, but Kate becomes suspicious of the father's reluctance to reveal how he sustained facial burns. The team is pushed to their limits when Yvonne and Cathy are involved in a bad accident whilst out biking. Judy's emotions finally get the better of her whilst dealing with a group of rowdy stag night revellers. Jack and Sam give in to temptation following a heart-to-heart. Robert urges Mike to apply for the registrar's post. Final appearance of Yvonne Silver (Kim Vithana)
10	"Crossing the Line"	David Tucker	Eirene Houston	7.36	14 June 2001
Andrew deals with two young children involved in a serious accident on a railway line. Terry has his hands full dealing with a disruptive patient who is determined to bribe her way into theatre. Sam deals with an infected flesh wound involving a lively young couple who have an uncontrollable urge to make love to each other. Mike is angered when Jack sabotages his interview, and he loses the registrar's post to Stuart. Sam reveals to Christine that she and Jack slept together. Robert begins to lose his patience with Jack. Final appearances of Sister Cathy Jordan (Jane Slavin) and Dr. Andrew Argyle (Dominic Mafham)
11	"Healthy in Body"	Jon East	Danny Miller	6.48	21 June 2001
Robert is angered to discover that Jack has called a risk management investigator into the hospital to question the team following the intubation disaster. Mike goes head-to-head with Robert over the treatment of a drug addict who appears to be showing signs of sickle cell anaemia, and tries to help a young schoolboy whose problems seem to stem from the lack of attention from his mother. The team uses a golden opportunity to prank David when he learns that Zara Phillips is a good friend of one of his patients.
12	"The Mortal Mind"	Jon East	Joe Ainsworth	7.22	28 June 2001
Robert confronts Jack over the risk management investigation. Unwilling to let Robert ruin his mood, Jack attends a hospital fundraiser, but is called away during the festivities by Kate, who is dealing with the victim of a motorbike crash. On his way back, he is involved in a car accident, but having been banned from driving, he flees the scene before the police arrive. Distracted, he makes a tragic misdiagnosis of Kate's patient. Mike deals with a private who appears to have been beaten by members of his squadron.
13	"Scrambled Eggs"	David Tucker	Éanna Ó'Lochlainn	6.92	5 July 2001
The arrival of management consultants brings Robert to his lowest ebb, and he is forced to control his emotions whilst dealing with a dementia patient whose daughter is in denial. Terry is pleased to see an old friend, Des, who has been drafted in as agency cover. But when he suspects Des of stealing controlled drugs, their reunion soon turns sour. A coach crash leads to an influx of injured football supporters, and as Christine comes across a copy of the missing X-ray, Robert announces that he is resigning.
14	"Silence is Golden"	David Tucker	Eirene Houston	7.04	12 July 2001
Christine confronts Jack and forces him to admit the truth. Robert formally announces that he is leaving the hospital. A gas explosion in a poker club results in an influx of injured victims, and David's inability to thrive under pressure is called into question. Kate deals with the victim of a bicycle crash and has trouble shaking off a persistent admirer. Christine forces Jack to tell Robert the truth, but Robert isn't willing to sweep the matter under the carpet and forces Jack to tender his resignation to the board. Final appearances of Dr. David Scobie (David Partridge), Dr. Mike Gregson (David Harewood), Dr. Stuart Phelan (Paul Warriner), Dr. Kate Brady (Tamzin Malleson) and Dr. Raz Amin (Silas Carson)

=== Series 4 (2002) ===
No.	Title	Directed by	Written by	Ratings (in millions)	Original release date
1	"A New Breed"	Christopher King	Joe Ainsworth	6.74	4 July 2002
A fatal motorway coach crash results in a hectic shift for the team. Danny Barton's first day goes from bad to worse when he inadvertently informs a patient's relatives of their son's death, despite him having been discharged several hours earlier, and then ends up being held at gunpoint by the father of a young boy who was murdered after becoming caught up in a turf war. Jack's capability is called into question when he ignores hospital procedure and performs a brain operation on a dying patient. First appearances of Dr. Ruth Cole (Jaye Griffiths), Dr. Danny Barton (James Murray), Sister Poppy Jonston (Michele Austin), Dr. Jeffrey Drummond (Don Gallagher), Dr. Saskia Walker (Emily Hamilton), Sunita Verma (Parminder Nagra), Raj Verma (Bhasker Patel), Ajay Verma (Ronny Jhutti) and Jean Kenning (Judy Holt)
2	"The Protége"	Christopher King	Suzie Smith	5.86	11 July 2002
Christine is interviewed for the position of clinical director in Robert's absence. Jack discovers that one of his former pupils, James De Costa, is being primed for a new registrar's job in the hospital. Terry deals with two brothers who are injured whilst participating in an illegal fight club. Saskia treats a young woman complaining of abdominal pain, who later reveals that she has taken more than forty pills in an attempt to take her own life. Jack is forced to perform an emergency operation on a pregnant patient. First appearance of Dr. James Da Costa (Ben Taylor)
3	"Out of Time"	Moira Armstrong	Lisa Hunt	5.89	18 July 2002
Robert is surprised to learn about Christine's promotion, but is forced to put his emotions on the back burner to deal with a double stabbing. Christine deals with a difficult patient who has misinformed her partner about her ability to conceive. James tries to perform a tricky procedure on a patient with a dislocated elbow, but Ruth goes above his head and contacts Jack. A tense situation arises when Robert is unable to locate blood supplies for his patients. A relative of a deceased patient vows to take revenge on Terry.
4	"Against the State"	Moira Armstrong	Ben Cooper	5.00	25 July 2002
An elderly patient admitted with a broken arm makes a live television interview claiming that he was assaulted by a group of black youths. His claims spark racial tension in the black communities of Manchester, sparking a series of incidents which lead to a riot, and Terry and Jay being caught up in the centre of the action. Jay is later admitted after starting a brawl, but unexpectedly comes face to face with a man he attacked. Sam is approached by the leader of a local gang, who claims to be holding her brother captive. Final appearances of Dr. Saskia Walker (Emily Hamilton) and Ajay Verma (Ronny Jhutti)
5	"Warrior's Heart"	Christopher King	Alan Pollock	5.90	1 August 2002
Christine and Ruth come head-to-head over the treatment of a patient involved in a road traffic accident. Poppy's first day as a qualified nurse practitioner goes from bad to worse when she faces a barrage of abuse from a young boy's father. Christine informs the team that Robert has been suspended until the investigation into his outburst is concluded. The gang holding Sam's brother starts to put pressure on her, and she makes a shocking discovery about James. Terry struggles to come to terms with Jay's death.
6	"Death of an Everyday Occurrence"	Christopher King	Matthew Hall	5.32	8 August 2002
Jack is angered when James takes credit for one of his operations on television. Danny deals with a difficult elderly patient whose daughter suffers from William's Syndrome. Jeffrey tries to push Robert into resigning. Jack is forced to perform an operation on a paraplegic patient without the use of a general anaesthetic, and later makes a shock proposal to Christine. James confronts Sam when he discovers that she has been stealing from the drugs trial. Robert and Sunita face up to their feelings for one another.
7	"Do Not Pass Go"	Christopher King	Nick Saltrese	5.94	15 August 2002
Danny and Judy try to prevent the relatives of a young boy who died of cardiac arrest, finding out that he died in a brothel after having sex with another man. Robert tries to save the life of a base jumper whose parachute failed to open. Sam faces her worst nightmare when a young girl who had been following an overdose is found to have taken Plavitron. Ruth is furious when she discovers that Tessa has been unfaithful to her. Robert tells Christine that he intends to leave to take up a professorship in Edinburgh.
8	"The Last Will and Testament of Robert Kingsford"	Christopher King	Lisa Hunt	6.61	22 August 2002
As it is Robert's last day, the rest of the team plans a surprise party for him. However, before he can take a sabbatical, he is forced to put all his efforts into saving a young boy who has been trapped inside a cold store. Sam informs James that her brother appears to have been part of the scam. Christine is disgusted to discover that Drummond plans to split A&E, making James head of a new minors department. In the heat of the moment, she agrees to marry Jack, but soon realises that she cannot be without Robert.
