= The Thing That Hurts =

Upcoming drama film

- Directed by: Arnaud Desplechin
- Screenplay by: Arnaud Desplechin; Kamen Velkovsky
- Produced by: Daya Fernandez; Amaury Nolasco; Alois Rubenbauer; Charles Gillibert; Kamen Velkovsky; Atilla Yücer; Benoit Roland
- Starring: Felicity Jones; Jason Schwartzman; J. K. Simmons; Golshifteh Farahani; Alfre Woodard
- Production companies: Gravel Lake Entertainment; for 3SIX9 Studios; CG Cinema; Alaz Film; Wrong Men
- Country: Belgium
- Language: English

The Thing That Hurts is an upcoming film by Arnaud Desplechin, starring Felicity Jones, Jason Schwartzman, J. K. Simmons, Golshifteh Farahani and Alfre Woodard.

== Premise ==
Following the death of an American psychotherapist in Paris, her former patients discuss her impact.

== Cast ==
- Jason Schwartzman
- Golshifteh Farahani
- Alfre Woodard
- J. K. Simmons
- Felicity Jones
- Noémie Merlant
- André Holland
- Teddie Allen

== Production ==
The film is written and directed by Arnaud Desplechin, after receiving a pitch for the film proposed by Kamen Velkovsky, with whom he worked on Two Pianos.

=== Development ===
Léa Seydoux, Jason Schwartzman, John Turturro and Golshifteh Farahani initially joined the cast in March 2024. By April 2026, Wes Anderson had become an executive producer with production from Gravel Lake Entertainment with Daya Fernandez, Amaury Nolasco and Alois Rubenbauer for 3SIX9 Studios, Charles Gillibert for CG Cinema with Kamen Velkovsky and Atilla Yücer for Alaz Film and Benoit Roland for Wrong Men. Alfre Woodard, J.K. Simmons, Felicity Jones, Noémie Merlant, André Holland and Teddie Allen had joined the cast alongside Schwartzman and Farahani.

=== Filming ===
Principal photography began on 7 April 2026 and lasted until 15 May, with filming locations including Brussels and Paris and Benin, with the film moving into post-production.
