= Four Kids and It =

2020 film by Andy De Emmony

- Release poster
- Directed by: Andy De Emmony
- Written by: Simon Lewis; Mark Oswin
- Based on: Four Children and It by Jacqueline Wilson
- Produced by: Julie Baines; Anne Brogan
- Starring: Paula Patton; Matthew Goode; Teddie-Rose Malleson-Allen; Ashley Aufderheide; Russell Brand; Michael Caine
- Cinematography: John Pardue
- Edited by: Alex Mackie
- Music by: Anne Nikitin
- Production companies: Dan Films; Kindle Entertainment; Deadpan Pictures
- Distributed by: Sky Cinema
- Release date: 3 April 2020
- Running time: 110 minutes
- Country: United Kingdom
- Language: English
- Box office: $798,211

Four Kids and It is a 2020 British fantasy film directed by Andy De Emmony and written by Simon Lewis and Mark Oswin. It is based on the 2012 novel Four Children and It by Jacqueline Wilson, which is based on E. Nesbit's 1902 novel Five Children and It.

The film stars Paula Patton, Matthew Goode, Russell Brand and Michael Caine.

== Plot ==
The film is set at a beach in Cornwall where siblings Ros and Robbie spend a holiday with their father David, his girlfriend Alice, and her daughters Samantha and Maudie from America. The children dislike each other at first but begin to get along once they discover a mysterious magical creature, Psammead or Sand Fairy, on the beach. Psammead can grant one wish a day, but the wish ends at sunset.

Using a wish with Psammead, the children travel back 100 years. There they meet the aristocratic Tristan Trent who holds Ros at gunpoint and demands to know about the Sand Fairy. However, Samantha, Robbie, and Maudie ask Psammead for superpowers and rescue Ros.

Next, the children travel to the past to learn how to make a wish permanent, but are unsuccessful. The children return to the present, where Tristan Trent III wants to use the Sand Fairy for dastardly deeds. Tristan finds the Sand Fairy's location by putting a tracking device under Ros's shoe. The children take Psammead with them and trap Tristan on the beach.

Afterwards, the children realize they like each other. They take Psammead to their house, hiding him from their parents in the bathroom. Meanwhile, Tristan escaped the beach.

In the next morning, when David and Alice take the children to the beach, Psammead takes some of the things in the cottage for his "offerings" before he was being captured by Tristan. After returning to the cottage, the children discovered that Tristan has escaped the beach and captured Psammead. When the children arrived at his mansion, they discovered that Tristan has made lots of wishes such as plush pad, purple henchwomen and the row of Range Rover SUVs, resulting Psammead being weak. Tristan threatens Psammead to make more wishes by having the children being held hostages and threatens to shoot them if he refused to make more wishes, Psammead then reluctantly agrees, but informed him that it will be his last wish. Tristan made a wish about having lots of gold, Psammead then made one last wish for Tristan, informing the children to escape the mansion. Although Tristan's wish came true, but his mansion was flooded with gold. Although the sun is set, Tristan's mansion had collapsed.

Believing that Psammead is dead, the children begin to mourn, but Psammead has been revived after Maudie placed some parts of sand on him with her shoe.

On the last day of their vacation, the children takes Psammead to another beach, while Ros make her final wish to make an app that can return to the original families, Tristan, who reveals to have escape the mansion, tracks down the children by using a transmitter on Ros' shoe and demand Psammead's whereabouts when Psammead had suddenly vanished. David and Alice saw Tristan dragging the children, thinking that Tristan had been assaulting the children, David knocks Tristan by punching him and call the police. The children then returns to the beach to find Psammead, Ros finally realized that she has accepted Alice, Smash and Maudie as her family, so she decided to wish Psammead can sleep through 100 years, the children then bid Psammead a farewell before his dormant begins while Tristan has been arrested. The children then reunites with their parents and they all walk on the beach when the sun sets.

In the mid credits, lots of people attending the book signing etiquette in the bookstore to get autographs from Ros after she published her first book, "The Return of the Psammead".

== Cast ==
- Billy Jenkins as Robbie
- Ashley Aufderheide as Samantha (Smash)
- Teddie-Rose Malleson-Allen as Ros
- Ellie-Mae Siame as Maudie
- Paula Patton as Alice
- Russell Brand as Tristan Trent III, Tristan Trent I
- Michael Caine as the voice of Psammead, Sand Fairy
- Matthew Goode as David
- Cheryl as Coco
- William Franklyn-Miller as Carl
- Paul Bazely as Sgt. Gas
- Finbarr Doyle as Security Guard

== Production ==
Principal photography began in July 2018 in Ireland.

== Release ==
Four Kids and It was originally intended for a simultaneous release on the subscription service Sky Cinema and in cinemas in the United Kingdom on 10 April 2020, but due to the COVID-19 pandemic, it was released solely on Sky Cinema on 3 April. In the United States, the film was released on digital, Blu-ray, DVD, and on demand on 30 June 2020 by Lionsgate.

== Reception ==
On the review aggregator website Rotten Tomatoes, the film holds an approval rating of 49% based on 43 reviews, with an average rating of 5.4/10. The website's critics consensus reads, "Four Kids and It has a few moments of whimsy and charm, but it's not enough to leave a lasting impression." On Metacritic, the film has a weighted average score of 42 out of 100 based on reviews from seven critics, indicating "mixed or average" reviews.

Guy Lodge of Variety wrote, "'Careful what you wish for' may have been the essential moral takeaway from the sourcebooks, but that wasn't to discourage wishing for anything at all: In all respects, this serviceable but anodyne programmer could dream a bit bigger." Justin Lowe of The Hollywood Reporter called it "More curio than classic, Four Kids and It may hold children's attention (and sometimes test adults' patience) over the movie's brief running time, but seems unlikely to inspire many a second viewing." Anna Smith of Empire wrote: "The kids and Caine are good, but this lacks the magic of its source novels. Younger children may enjoy it, but its attempts to entertain older viewers mostly fall flat."

The film grossed $798,211 worldwide.
