= Keith Allen (actor) =

Welsh actor (born 1953)

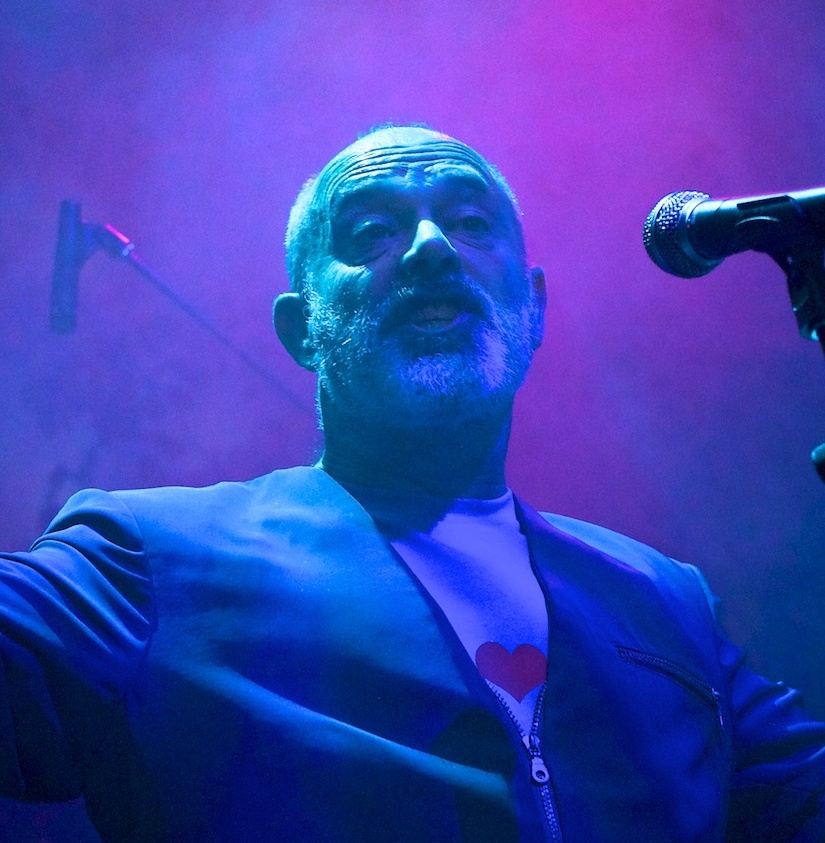
- Allen in 2012
- Born: Keith Howell Charles Allen; 2 September 1953 (age 73); Gorseinon, West Glamorgan, Wales
- Occupations: Actor; comedian; musician; author; broadcaster
- Years active: 1979–present
- Spouses: Alison Owen (m. 1984; div. 1989) Nira Park (m. 1997, divorced)
- Partner: Tamzin Malleson
- Children: 6, including Lily, Alfie and Teddie
- Relatives: Kevin Allen (brother)

Keith Howell Charles Allen (born 2 September 1953) is a Welsh actor, pantomime star, comedian, singer, writer, director, producer and television presenter.

== Early life and education ==
Keith Howell Charles Allen was born on 2 September 1953 in Gorseinon, Wales. (Note: This dead source says he was born in Llanelli, Carmarthenshire, the second of three children) His father was Edward Charles Owen, a Royal Navy petty officer submariner, and his mother a Welsh waitress. His younger brother is actor Kevin Allen. He spent his early years near Swansea and in Malta, and most of his childhood in Gosport, Hampshire, while his father served in Portsmouth or away at sea. Although he spent much of his life in England, he regards himself as Welsh despite taking part in various songs for the England football team.

At the age of 11, when his father was posted to Singapore, he was sent to boarding school at Sir Anthony Browns Brentwood, a public school in Essex. He was expelled from the school at the age of 13 after causing trouble at morning assembly. This led to a period in borstal before attending Brune Park Community School in Gosport. He has stated that he went to a comprehensive school in Swansea, a public school, a borstal, and a detention centre, all within five years. He earned six O-levels, leading to entry to the Welsh College of Music and Drama. Parking in the principal's carpark and an ensuing row led to his expulsion from the college.

== Career ==
Allen has worked in both films and television, presented television programmes, he has also appeared in pantomimes.

=== Early work ===
After having several jobs during the 1970s, including a job as a stagehand from which he was sacked after joining Max Bygraves' chorus line on stage naked, Allen worked as a stand-up comedian and vocalist, opening for punk bands such as The Clash.

=== Acting career ===
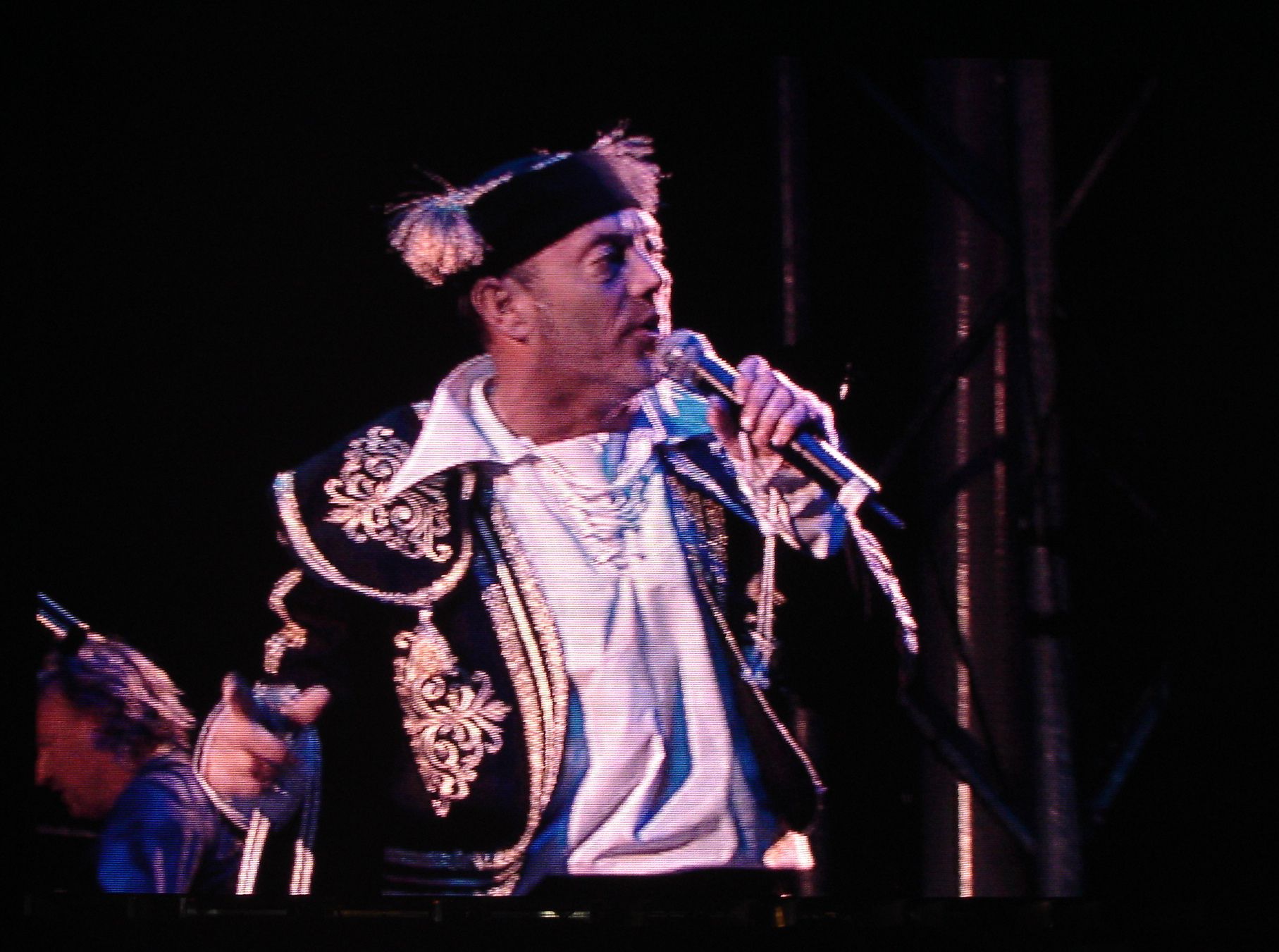
Allen in 2005

Allen appeared in a number of films in the Channel 4 series The Comic Strip Presents... (1983-1993), after becoming one of the breakthrough acts of the Comedy Store in 1979. Notable episodes featuring Allen include The Bullshitters: Roll Out The Gunbarrel (a parody of The Professionals), and The Yob (a parody of The Fly), which he also co-wrote. Allen appeared alongside fellow Comic Strip alumni as Pestilence in "Interesting", an episode of The Young Ones. In 1985 he appeared in The Comic Strip film The Supergrass.

In 1986, he appeared in a film about the Tolpuddle Martyrs in Comrades.

During the brief period of British Satellite Broadcasting as an alternative satellite broadcaster to Sky, he had a regular comedy show of his own I Love Keith Allen on the Galaxy channel, a mix of stand-up and sketches. He appeared in the final Carry On film playing Pepi The Poisoner in Carry On Columbus (1992).

Following an appearance in the black comedy Twin Town, directed by his brother Kevin, Allen was cast in a main role as a Downing Street press secretary in Mick Jackson's the Channel 4 adaptation of A Very British Coup. He played the lodger who dies at the beginning of Danny Boyle's thriller Shallow Grave (1994). In the same year, he played Jonas Chuzzlewit in a BBC adaptation of Charles Dickens' Martin Chuzzlewit. He worked with Boyle again, this time portraying a drug dealer in Trainspotting (1996). Danny Boyle has said that Allen's character in Trainspotting is the same one that moves into the shared flat in Shallow Grave – he wears the same clothes. He also appeared disguised as a fictional hip-hop star "Keithski" to present Top of the Pops on 2 March 1995.

In 2000, Allen appeared in two Harold Pinter plays at the Almeida Theatre, playing Lambert in Celebration and Mr Sands in The Room. These were performed again at The Lincoln Center Festival in July 2001.

In 2001, he played the character of "problem-solver" Jim Napeworth in an episode of Murder in Mind, and in 2004 as poker player Dave 'Mouse Ears' Smith in Black Books. In 2002 he played the London Records executive Roger Ames in 24 Hour Party People, a film about Factory Records and the Manchester music scene. Allen appeared in the Channel 4 sitcom Spaced, in a short homage to the Stanley Kubrick film, The Shining. He appeared as the villain in Agent Cody Banks 2: Destination London, opposite Frankie Muniz. He appeared in the hospital drama, Bodies, as Mr Tony Whitman, a consultant obstetrician. In 2005 he appeared in the Endemol-produced BBC Two television programme Art School alongside Ulrika Jonsson, John Humphrys, and Clarissa Dickson Wright where he discovered a passion for painting. From 2006 to 2009, Allen appeared as the Sheriff of Nottingham in the BBC's drama series Robin Hood.

Allen has also appeared in pantomimes, such as an adaptation of Robert Louis Stevenson's Treasure Island in 2008, written by Ken Ludwig and directed by Sean Holmes; he took the role of Long John Silver in the Theatre Royal Haymarket.

In September 2011, he appeared as DI Hale in the BBC six-part drama series The Body Farm. In 2012, he appeared in the Sara Sugarman comedy film Vinyl, portraying an aging rock star who finds himself back in the public eye after his band member fools the music industry into giving them a record deal. In 2013, he played Darren the farmer in episode 1.5 of the comedy drama series Great Night Out.

In January 2021, Allen played serial killer John Cooper in the ITV three-part drama, The Pembrokeshire Murders. In 2023, Allen appeared as Dai Williams in the BBC crime drama Steeltown Murders.

=== TV presenter ===
Allen presented the TV show Whatever You Want in 1982, during the early days of Channel Four and has presented television documentaries for Victor Lewis-Smith's Associated-Rediffusion Television Productions: Little Lady Fauntleroy (2004), which saw Allen interview Lauren Harries and her family, You're Fayed (2005) and on Michael Carroll – King of Chavs (2006). In 2007 his documentary Tourette De France appeared on Channel 4, in which he travelled with a group of Scottish people with Tourette syndrome, including John Davidson, on an AEC Routemaster bus from London to the Parisian hospital where this condition was described by Georges Gilles de la Tourette in 1884. He also presented the British erotic direct-to-video series Red Tape.

Allen presented the Manchester Passion, a contemporary retelling of the last few hours in the life of Jesus on Good Friday, 14 April 2006. Keith Allen Will Burn in Hell appeared on Channel 4 in June 2007, and showed Allen profiling the controversial Westboro Baptist Church, led by Fred Phelps, and speaking to members of the church and Phelps's family. Keith Meets Keith, screened on 14 September 2009 on Channel 4, in which Allen tracked down TV chef Keith Floyd. The show contained what turned out to be Floyd's final interview for television, as he died of a heart attack on the evening the documentary was screened.

Allen's documentary film about the death of Diana, Princess of Wales, Unlawful Killing was intended for release in 2011. Mohamed Al-Fayed, the film's only financial backer, contributed the film's £2.5 million budget. Allen argued in The Guardian that it detailed a "provable conspiracy after the crash". It accuses Queen Elizabeth and Princess Margaret of being "gangsters in tiaras" and Prince Philip of being a "psychopath". Allen said he refused to make 87 cuts asked for by lawyers to enable the film to be shown in Britain. His film was permanently shelved in 2012 after it became known it could not be screened in the United States as it was impossible to insure it against potential litigation.

=== Music ===
Allen was a member of London punk band the Atoms in the 1970s, and later Fat Les, a band which also featured artist Damien Hirst and Blur bassist Alex James.

He was also closely associated with the band New Order, directing the video for their 1993 song "Ruined in a Day", which depicts Allen and the band members immersed in a bizarre game of charades with a group of Buddhist monks. He co-wrote their only UK number one single, "World in Motion", and occasionally performed with them live, including their headline show at the Reading Festival in 1998. He also appeared in the band's DVD New Order Story, where he played host to a fictional New Order game show.

Allen appeared as the businessman in the music video to Blur's 1995 hit "Country House".

He has been involved in several other football-related records, including "England's Irie" by Black Grape, and wrote the lyrics for the Fat Les England song "Vindaloo". He also contributed the song "On Me Head, Son" to the film Mike Bassett: England Manager, credited on the soundtrack album to Sporting Les.

== Personal life ==
As a guest on Top Gear on 9 December 2007, Allen said that claims he had eight children were not true, and that he actually has six children by four women. His children include pop singer Lily Allen and actor Alfie Allen with his first wife Alison Owen. He married his second wife, Nira Park, in 1997. After his divorce from Park, Allen became the partner of actress Tamzin Malleson (who starred alongside him in Bodies), and the couple had a daughter, Teddie Allen, in 2006. They live in Stroud, Gloucestershire. In 2017, Allen and Malleson opened a diner in Stroud, built with the diner set of Kingsman: The Golden Circle, which Allen recovered after shooting the film.

In the mid-1980s, Allen served a 21-day jail sentence in Pentonville Prison after being found guilty of criminal damage at the Zanzibar club in Covent Garden.

Although a staunch socialist, whose political philosophy was influenced by the Workers' Revolutionary Party, Allen has expressed grudging admiration for Conservative Party politicians David Cameron and William Hague.

Allen has on his shoulder a tattoo of Rinka the dog, owned by Norman Scott, which was shot dead during the Jeremy Thorpe scandal. He has explained that: "I had the tattoo placed on my arm lest I forget, so I have a history of having suspicions about the establishment and the government and court cases".

He is a supporter of Fulham Football Club.

== Selected filmography ==
=== Film ===
Year	Title	Role	Notes
1985	The Supergrass	Wong	
1985	Loose Connections	Keith	
1986	Comrades	James Hammett	
1988	The Yob	Patrick Church	
1989	Scandal	Kevin	
1990	Chicago Joe and the Showgirl	Lenny Bexley	
1992	Carry On Columbus	Pepi The Poisoner	
1993	The Young Americans	Jack Doyle	
1994	Shallow Grave	Hugo	
1994	Beyond Bedlam	Marc Gilmour	
1994	Captives	Lenny	
1995	Blue Juice	Mike	
1996	Loch Ness	Gordon Shoals	
1996	Trainspotting	The Dealer	
1997	Twin Town	Emrys	
2000	Rancid Aluminium	Dr Jones	
2001	The Others	Mr. Marlish	
2001	My Wife Is an Actress	Dave, The Film Director	
2001	Mike Bassett: England Manager	Himself	
2002	24 Hour Party People	Roger Ames	
2004	Agent Cody Banks 2: Destination London	Victor Diaz	
2004	De-Lovely	Irving Berlin	
2008	A Film with Me in It	Jack	
2011	Unlawful Killing	Narrator	Also director
2013	Vinyl	Minto, band member	
2015	Hector	Jimbo	
2016	Eddie the Eagle	Terry, Father	
2017	Kingsman: The Golden Circle	Charles	
2021	La Cha Cha	Paulie	
2021	Rise of the Footsoldier: Origins	Dave Simms	
2023	The Buckingham Murders	Miller	
2025	Bampi's Soup	Bampi	

=== Television ===
Year	Title	Role	Notes
1982	The Young Ones	Pestilence	Episode: "Interesting"
1988	A Very British Coup	Thompson	3 episodes
1989–1991	Making Out	Rex Buckley	12 episodes
1990	Jackson Pace: The Great Years	Jackson Pace	6 episodes
1993	Inspector Morse	John Peter Barrie	Episode: "The Day of the Devil"
1994	Faith	Jeff Wagland	4 episodes
1994	Martin Chuzzlewit	Jonas Chuzzlewit	6 episodes
1996	Sharman	Brady	Episode: "Hearts of Stone"
1997	Born to Run	Byron Flitch	6 episodes
1998	The Life and Crimes of William Palmer	Dr. William Palmer	2 episodes
1999	Jack of Hearts	Jack Denby	6 episodes
2000–2001	Bob Martin	Vinnie	11 episodes
2004	Black Books	Dave "Mouse Ears" Smith	Episode: "A Little Flutter"
2004	Little Lady Fauntleroy	Presenter	Channel 4 documentary
2004–2006	Bodies	Dr. Tony Whitman	17 episodes
2005–2011	New Tricks	Roger McHugh	2 episodes
2006–2009	Robin Hood	Vaisey, Sheriff of Nottingham	34 episodes
2007	Mobile	Sir James Corson	3 episodes
2009	Keith Meets Keith	himself	Television film; also director
2010–2011	The Runaway	Danny Dixon	6 episodes
2011	Case Histories	Richard Moat	2 episodes
2011	The Body Farm	D.I. Hale	6 episodes
2013	Great Night Out	Darren, the farmer	Episode: #1.5
2013	By Any Means	Nicholas Mason	Episode: #1.1
2014–2015	My Mad Fat Diary	Victor	3 episodes
2015	Uncle	Uncle Frank	Episode: #2.5
2016	We're Doomed! The Dad's Army Story	Paul Fox	Television film
2016	Time Crashers	Himself	
2016	Death in Paradise	Neil Jenkins	Episode: "Lost Identity"
2018	Marcella	Alan Summers	6 episodes
2021	The Pembrokeshire Murders	John Cooper	3 episodes
2021	Midsomer Murders	Harry Marx	Episode: "The Stitcher Society"
2022	Agatha Raisin	Rev. Arthur Chance	Episode: "A Spoonful of Poison"
2023	Steeltown Murders	Dai Williams	4 episodes
2025	EastEnders	Gaz	Guest 1 Episode
2026	Crookhaven	Erasmus Sisman	4 episodes

=== Music videos ===
Year	Title	Role
1990	ENGLANDneworder: "World in Motion"	Himself
1995	Blur: "Country House"	Successful Fella
1998	Fat Les: "Vindaloo"	Narrator

== Books ==
- Allen, Keith (June 2007). Grow Up. Ebury Press. ISBN 978-0-09-191070-9.
