= Teddie Allen =

English actress (born 2006)

- Born: Teddie Rose Malleson-Allen; 9 April 2006 (age 20); Stroud, England
- Other name: Teddie Malleson-Allen
- Years active: 2015–present
- Parents: Keith Allen (father); Tamzin Malleson (mother)
- Family: Lily Allen (half-sister); Alfie Allen (half-brother); Kevin Allen (uncle)

Teddie Rose Malleson-Allen (born 9 April 2006) is an English actress. She began her career as a child actress in the films Swallows and Amazons (2016) and Four Kids and It (2020). More recently, she appeared on television in the Viaplay series Wisting (2024) and the Paramount+ series MobLand (2025).

== Early life ==
Allen was born in Stroud, Gloucestershire, to English actress Tamzin Malleson and Welsh performer Keith Allen. Her older paternal half-siblings are Lily and Alfie Allen.

== Career ==
Allen made her television debut as Frances in the 2015 BBC One television film adaptation of Laurie Lee's memoir Cider with Rosie, and her feature film debut as Tatty Walker in the family adventure film Swallows and Amazons the following year. She went on to star as Ros in the 2020 children's fantasy film Four Kids and It. She also contributed her voice to the BBC Radio 4 audio drama Children of the Stones.

In 2024, Allen returned to television when she joined the fourth season of the Norwegian Viaplay series Wisting as Charlotte Greenwood. This was followed by a notable role as Gina da Souza in the Paramount+ series MobLand in 2025. Allen has an upcoming role in the Amazon Prime series Malice.

== Filmography ==
=== Film ===
Year	Title	Role	Notes
2016	Swallows and Amazons	Tatty Walker	
2020	Four Kids and It	Ros	
TBA	The Thing That Hurts		

=== Television ===
Year	Title	Role	Notes
2015	Cider with Rosie	Frances	Television film
2024	Wisting	Charlotte Greenwood	Series 3
2025–present	MobLand	Gina da Souza	recurring role season 1; main role season 2 (10 episodes)
2025	Malice	April Tanner	6 episodes
