= Tamzin Malleson =

English actress

- Born: 1 May 1974 (age 52); Yeovil, Somerset, England
- Occupation: Actress
- Years active: 1996–present
- Television: Dangerfield; Teachers; Bodies; Midsomer Murders
- Partner: Keith Allen
- Children: Teddie Allen

Tamzin Malleson (born 1 May 1974) is a British actress.

== Early life and education ==
Malleson was born in Yeovil, and attended Horsley Primary School in Horsley, Gloucestershire, where she had her first taste of acting as a Munchkin. She furthered her drama activities in Archway School in Stroud, Gloucestershire.

== Career ==
She originally played Alison Dangerfield in Series 3 and 4 of the BBC drama Dangerfield, before going on to play one of the starring roles (Penny Neville) in the Channel 4 comedy Teachers for three of the programme's four series, and she starred in one of ITV's Poirot adaptations, "Evil Under The Sun". She appeared in The Bill, and in the detective show A Touch of Frost, and starred in the BBC medical drama Bodies.

Malleson played the role of Kate Wilding, the pathologist in the series Midsomer Murders, from the middle of series 14 to the end of series 17.

== Personal life ==
Malleson is in a relationship with actor Keith Allen, father of actors Lily Allen and Alfie Allen, who starred alongside her in Bodies. The couple have one daughter, the actress Teddie Allen, who was born in 2006. They live near Stroud, Gloucestershire. In 2017, Allen and Malleson opened a diner in Stroud, built with the diner set of Kingsman: The Golden Circle, in which Allen had appeared.

== Filmography ==
Films
Year	Title	Role	Notes
1998	The Fishmonger's Daughter	Ruby	Short film
2005	The Man-Eating Lions of Njombe	Ruby	TV film
2007	Kitchen	Liz	TV film
2010	Between You & Me	Sammy	Short film
2010	Nocturn	Jody	Short film
2011	7 Lives	Mary	Film
2021	La Cha Cha	Virginia Callaway	Film

Television
Year	Title	Role	Notes
1996	A Touch of Frost	Helen Tudor	Episode: "Deep Waters"
1996	Kavanagh QC	Helen Kinross	Episode: "The Burning Deck"
1996–1997	Dangerfield	Alison Dangerfield	16 episodes
1998–1999	The Bill	Carrie Winkler	Episode: "Deep Secret"; Episode: "Murder, What Murder?"
2000–2001	Always and Everyone	Kate Brady	2 episodes
2001	Agatha Christie's Poirot	Christine Redfern	Episode: "Evil Under the Sun"
2003	The Vice	P.C. Lorraine Johnstone	Series 5 regular, 6 episodes
2004	Murder City	Rosa Mansfield	Episode: "Nothing Sacred"
2002–2004	Teachers	Penny Neville	Main character
2004–2006	Bodies	Polly Grey	Main character
2009	Boy Meets Girl	Siobhan	TV miniseries
2011–2015	Midsomer Murders	Kate Wilding	Main character
2015	Unforgotten	Caroline Greaves	4 episodes
2018	Marcella	JoJo	3 episodes
