= MobLand =

2025 British crime drama television series

- Text logo for the first season
- Genre: Crime drama
- Created by: Ronan Bennett
- Showrunner: Jez Butterworth
- Starring: Tom Hardy; Pierce Brosnan; Paddy Considine; Joanne Froggatt; Lara Pulver; Anson Boon; Jasmine Jobson; Mandeep Dhillon; Daniel Betts; Helen Mirren; Geoff Bell; Janet McTeer; Jordi Mollà; Toby Jones; Teddie Allen; Emmett J. Scanlan; Johnny Flynn; Ophelia Lovibond
- Opening theme: "Starburster" by Fontaines D.C.
- Composers: Ilan Eshkeri; Matt Bellamy
- Countries of origin: United Kingdom; United States
- Original language: English
- No. of seasons: 2
- No. of episodes: 20

Production
- Executive producers: David C. Glasser; Kris Thykier; Guy Ritchie; Ivan Atkinson; Ronan Bennett; Jez Butterworth; Tom Hardy; Dean Baker; Anthony Byrne; Ron Burkle; David Hutkin; Bob Yari
- Producer: Peter Heslop
- Production location: United Kingdom
- Running time: 39–59 minutes
- Production companies: Easter Partisan; Toff Guy Films Ltd.; Hardy Son and Baker; 101 Studios; Paramount Television Studios (Note: Known as MTV Entertainment Studios for season 1)

Original release
- Network: Paramount+
- Release: 30 March 2025 – present

MobLand is a crime drama television series created by Ronan Bennett for Paramount+. The series stars Tom Hardy as Harry Da Souza, Pierce Brosnan as Conrad Harrigan and Helen Mirren as Maeve Harrigan. Additional main characters include Kevin Harrigan (Paddy Considine), Jan Da Souza (Joanne Froggatt), Isabella Harrigan (Lara Pulver), Eddie Harrigan (Anson Boon), and Seraphina Harrigan (Mandeep Dhillon). Guy Ritchie, Anthony Byrne, Daniel Syrkin, and Lawrence Gough serve as directors. Jez Butterworth and Bennett are credited with writing all ten episodes of the first season.

The series premiered on 30 March 2025, and it ranked second in viewership on Paramount+. In June 2025, the series was renewed for a second season, which premiered on 18 September 2026. In September 2026, the series was renewed for a third season.

== Premise ==
Harry Da Souza is a street-smart fixer employed by the Harrigan family, a North London crime family, to clean up catastrophic messes and prevent an escalating gang war from tearing the reigning crime empire apart while shielding it from aggressive police scrutiny, enemy threats, and relentless internal betrayal.

The first season follows the explosive escalation of a bloody gang war between two dominant crime syndicates: the Harrigans and the Stevensons. As tensions between the families intensify, Harry is tasked with burying evidence, managing international criminal brokers, dealing with a high-level mole within the enterprise and preventing an all-out gang war.

The second season follows the eruption of a bitter conflict as family members scheme to seize control of the North London empire. Caught in the crossfire, central fixer Harry must navigate a minefield of ruthless internal rivals, dangerous new cartels, and a corrupt detective hell-bent on dismantling the syndicate. To prevent the Harrigan dynasty from collapsing, he is forced to choose between family loyalty and his own survival.

== Cast and characters ==
=== Main ===
- Tom Hardy as Harry Da Souza, a fixer for the Harrigan crime family
- Pierce Brosnan as Conrad Harrigan, patriarch of the Harrigan family
- Paddy Considine as Kevin Harrigan, Conrad's and Maeve's second son, and Harry's longtime working partner
- Joanne Froggatt as Jan Da Souza (seasons 1–2), Harry's wife and Gina's mother
- Lara Pulver as Isabella "Bella" Harrigan, Kevin's wife and Eddie's mother
- Anson Boon as Eddie Harrigan, Kevin's and Isabella's impulsive, unruly son
- Jasmine Jobson as Zosia, a friend and close associate of Harry
- Mandeep Dhillon as Seraphina Harrigan, Conrad's daughter, Maeve's stepdaughter, and Kevin and Brendan's half-sister
- Daniel Betts as Brendan Harrigan (season 1), Conrad and Maeve's oldest son
- Helen Mirren as Maeve Harrigan, matriarch of the Harrigan family
- Geoff Bell as Richie Stevenson (season 1), the crime boss of the South London Stevenson gang
- Janet McTeer as Katherine "Kat" McAllister, an international kingpin with dirty hands connected to Harry and the US Ambassador to the United Kingdom
- Jordi Mollà as Jaime Lopez (season 1), the leader of a Mexican cartel involved in fentanyl production
- Toby Jones as Colin Tattersall, a retired DCI tasked with taking down the Harrigans
- Teddie Allen as Gina Da Souza (season 2–present; recurring season 1), Harry and Jan's teenage daughter
- Emmett J. Scanlan as Paul O'Donnell (season 2–present; recurring season 1), a long-serving Harrigan enforcer
- Johnny Flynn as Frankie Cooper (season 2), a ruthless and eccentric drug lord
- Ophelia Lovibond as Kavanagh (season 2), a DCI investigating the Harrigans

=== Recurring ===
- Antonio González Guerrero as Kiko (season 1), a close associate of Harry and Zosia
- Emily Barber as Alice Barnes / Nicola (season 1), Jan's new friend whom she meets in group therapy
- Lisa Dwan as O'Hara Delaney (season 1), the Harrigan family's lawyer
- Peter Ferdinando as Valjon (season 1), a London nightclub owner
- Dritan Kastrati as Charlie Sweet (season 1), a Stevenson enforcer
- Arnold Oceng as Olie Donker (season 1), a Stevenson enforcer
- Bradley Turner as Freddie Shaw (season 1), a Stevenson enforcer and Harry's informant
- Luke Mably as DS Ivan Fisk (season 1), a police officer investigating the Harrigan family
- Gemma Knight Jones as DC Yvonne Mukasa (season 1), Fisk's partner
- Grégoire Colin as Antoine Arloud (season 1), a French businessman wanting to connect with Lord Pennock
- Steven Pacey as Lord Pennock (season 1), Isabella's father and Kevin's father-in-law
- Nigel Lindsay as Alan Rusby (season 1), a former prison guard
- Alex Fine as Donnie (seasons 1–2), a fixer who works for Kat McAllister
- Warren Brown as Finch (season 2), a corrupt police detective working for Harry and Kavanagh's second-in-command
- Tobi Bakare as Mike Atkins (season 2), a member of Kavanagh's investigative team
- Elarica Johnson as Gemma (season 2), a member of Kavanagh's investigative team
- Samuel Gosrani as Iqbal Khan (season 2), a member of Kavanagh's investigative team
- Liam Dooley as Jojo (season 2), one of Frankie's enforcers

=== Guest ===
- Annie Cooper as Vron Stevenson (season 1), Richie's wife and Tommy's mother
- Alex Jennings as Archie Hammond (season 1), Conrad's loyal friend and advisor
- Tommy Flanagan as Moody (season 1), a mediator for when sit-down communication is needed between criminal factions
- Felix Edwards as Tommy Stevenson (season 1), Richie's and Vron's son
- Ethan Moorhouse as Hughie Campbell (season 1), a nightclub patron whom Eddie stabs
- Ellen Costa as Maria (season 1), the Da Souza's housekeeper
- Lia Williams as Emily Gutwell, a psychotherapist whom Jan visits
- Robert Dukes as Keith, the owner of the Falkands pub
- Jack Archer as Fergus (season 2), a newly recruited Harrigan enforcer and Paul's nephew
- Tobi Bamtefa as Dog (season 2), an associate of Harry and Zosia
- Stewart Scudamore as Gakbu Ruzgar (season 2), a Turkish drug kingpin working for Kat McAllister
- Amir El-Masry as Luca Ruzgar (season 2), Gakbu's brother
- Thom Ashley as Dean McCarthy (season 2), a waiter who witnesses a violent shootout
- Margaret Clunie as Nicole Greig (season 2), a lawyer hired by Conrad and Maeve
- Jules Knight as Andy Hossler (season 2), a lawyer hired by Conrad and Maeve
- Colm Meaney as Colm "Medusa" O'Connor (season 2), an intimidating and violent Irish gangster and Mad Dog's father
- Koël Purie Rinchet as Priyanka Gibber (season 2), Seraphina's mother and Conrad's former lover
- David Bedella as Charlton Gibber V (season 2), Seraphina's billionaire stepfather and Priyanka's husband
- George Georgiou as Stratos (season 2), a business owner in North London who works under the Harrigans
- Ainy Medina as Sicily (season 2), a stripper and Paul's ex-girlfriend
- Jake Mann as Joey (season 2), Frankie's loyal enforcer
- Conrad Khan as Michael Cooper (season 2), Frankie's incarcerated son in Newgate Prison
- Colin Morgan as Kelly "Mad Dog" O'Connor (season 2), Medusa's vengeful son and a notorious gangster newly released after serving 20 years in prison
- Chanel Cresswell as Mel Cooper (season 2), Frankie's abrasive ex-wife and Michael's mother

== Episodes ==
Series	Episodes	Originally released	
Series	Episodes	First released	Last released
1	10	30 March 2025	1 June 2025
2	10	18 September 2026	20 November 2026

=== Season 1 (2025) ===
No. overall	No. in season	Title	Directed by	Written by	Original release date
1	1	"Stick or Twist"	Guy Ritchie	Ronan Bennett and Jez Butterworth	30 March 2025
Harry Da Souza, a fixer for the Harrigan crime family led by crime boss Conrad and his wife Maeve, brokers a peace between two Harrigan-affiliated mob bosses. When it's revealed they were stealing from Conrad, both are executed along with their crews. Meanwhile, Conrad's reckless grandson, Eddie, embarks on a drug-fueled night with Tommy Stevenson, the son of rival crime boss Richie Stevenson, and two friends. Eddie stabs a man, Hughie Campbell, at a club, triggering panic. Harry is called in by Kevin and Bella, Eddie's parents, to resolve the problem. He intimidates the club owner, Valjon, into erasing CCTV footage, silences Hughie at the hospital, and disposes of Eddie's clothes. Back home, Harry finds his wife, Jan, starting therapy and befriending a woman named Alice. Tensions escalate when Tommy goes missing and Richie, aware Eddie was with him, demands answers. Eddie denies involvement. At a sit-down between families, Harry secures 24 hours to investigate while his team, Zosia and Kiko, lie in wait. Maeve and Conrad abort a planned hit on Richie. That night, Conrad gathers his children, Archie and O'Hara, to announce a move into the Stevensons' fentanyl business. When advisor Archie objects, Maeve exposes his alleged betrayal, prompting Conrad to kill him.
2	2	"Jigsaw Puzzle"	Guy Ritchie	Ronan Bennett and Jez Butterworth	6 April 2025
Harry disposes of Archie's body as Kevin recounts the night's turmoil. Conrad and Maeve reaffirm their plan to seize control of the Stevensons' fentanyl trade. The next morning, Harry is arrested, betrayed by someone inside the Harrigan circle. DS Fisk pressures him to turn on the family, but lawyer O'Hara secures his release. Meanwhile, Richie demands to interrogate Eddie, forcing Kevin to move him to the Harrigan estate in the Cotswolds. Zosia and Kiko escort Eddie, fending off Richie's ambush en route. Brendan proposes a business alliance to Seraphina, but she rejects him, citing his incompetence. Harry grows suspicious that Archie may have been a police informant, prompting Conrad to assign him to uncover the truth. Simultaneously, Bella secretly arranges a meeting between her estranged father, Lord Pennock, and her shady contact Antoine, hoping to exploit Pennock's influence in government. Richie blackmails Harry by threatening Gina's safety, trying to extract Tommy's whereabouts. Jan contemplates divorcing Harry, while Bella seeks his help in manipulating her father. Maeve continues to manipulate Eddie emotionally. Harry eventually tracks down Eddie's friends, learning Eddie's link to Valjon. Confronting Valjon, Harry extracts a confession, leading to the discovery of Tommy's mutilated and dismembered body hidden in a club's trunk.
3	3	"Plan B"	Anthony Byrne	Ronan Bennett and Jez Butterworth	13 April 2025
A bomb detonates at Kevin's house, prompting Harry to hide Jan and Gina with his indebted "friend", Mike. Harry fends off two of Richie's thugs, Freddie and Ollie, before meeting Kevin and Eddie at a covert shipyard, trailed by DS Fisk and Mukasa. They confront Eddie with a bloodied Valjon, revealing Eddie's role in Tommy's murder and his £10,000 payment to Valjon for Tommy's body disposal. Kevin informs Conrad and Maeve, who, surprisingly, do not punish Eddie. Instead, they decide that Harry should handle the fallout, while planning to kill Richie's wife, Vron, and Richie himself if necessary. With Kevin's help, Harry loses the police tail and fulfils a promise to Jan by securing a place at a nursing home for their housekeeper's mother. There, he recognises Rusby, a former corrections officer who abused him and Kevin in their youth. Harry and Kevin coerce Valjon into taking the blame for Tommy's death, threatening his children to ensure compliance. Richie seems convinced by Valjon's confession, but continues to torture him. Meanwhile, Bella privately asks Harry for help again after her father's meeting with Antoine goes badly. The police, led by DS Fisk, discover Archie's body following another anonymous tip.
4	4	"Rat Trap"	Anthony Byrne	Ronan Bennett and Jez Butterworth	20 April 2025
The discovery of Archie's body raises fears of another mole within the Harrigan family, particularly for Maeve, as only Conrad and Harry knew the burial site. Meanwhile, Kevin and Harry anxiously await Richie's reaction following his brutal interrogation of Valjon. During this period, Kevin confesses a disturbing truth about Bella. A mysterious man named Donnie visits Zosia, claiming to be Harry's friend and offering him "good news." Jan continues couples' therapy but faces intimidation when Conrad visits her and Alice, threatening her into silence about Harry's involvement in the family's criminal dealings. Unbeknownst to the family, Alice is an undercover police mole, aiming to get closer to Conrad. Maeve continues manipulating Eddie while secretly advancing her hidden agenda. After Jan informs Harry about Conrad's visit, his concerns grow. Harry then confronts Bella with recordings obtained from Antoine, warning her again about her risky secret deal, though Bella remains determined. As Harry leaves Bella's home, he encounters Kevin, leading to an awkward exchange. Later, Richie summons Harry alone and demands that he kill Valjon to prove his loyalty. Harry complies, brutally executing Valjon. Although Richie appears satisfied, he ominously insists the Harrigans attend Tommy's funeral, hinting at further tensions ahead.
5	5	"Funeral for a Friend"	Daniel Syrkin	Ronan Bennett and Jez Butterworth	27 April 2025
Conrad, Maeve, Kevin, Eddie, and Harry discuss battle plans for Tommy's wake and funeral, where the entire family, including Jan and Bella, are expected. They ultimately decide to follow Harry's plan to attend, but to have weapons smuggled as a safeguard. A shunned Brendan approaches the similarly omitted Seraphina with another offer to step up for the family with a diamond deal in Antwerp, which she accepts on her terms. Kevin recalls his traumatic abuse at the hands of Rusby. Harry then meets Freddie, a disgruntled Stevenson hand, and blackmails him into smuggling the weapons into the Stevenson home. The Harrigans attend the services as planned, with Fisk and crew, unknowingly tipped off by Jan, watching them off-site. Tensions rise amongst the group, especially when Eddie and Maeve go out of their way to antagonise the Stevensons. Vron publicly insults Maeve before Harry and Kevin drug the Harrigan matriarch to avoid further escalation. At the following sit-down, Richie privately reveals that he knew Valjon was a ruse but wants no war, except Eddie's fair game if the Stevensons can get to him. An enraged Maeve, however, breaks the uneasy truce and has Vron killed the next day with a planted car bomb.
6	6	"Antwerp Blues"	Daniel Syrkin	Ronan Bennett and Jez Butterworth	4 May 2025
As all-out war brews in the fallout of Vron's murder, Kevin, Bella, Harry, Jan, and a furious Gina move into the Harrigan's estate in the Cotswolds. Donnie returns with an offer from his boss, Kat McAllister. In the ensuing family meeting, Conrad covers for Maeve, stating Richie's veiled slights as the reason for triggering the week-old contingency to have Vron killed. He declares war and the eradication of the Stevensons, with Maeve and Eddie also mocking a vengeful Richie when he calls to state similar sentiments. Jan and Bella bond over their shared situation, while Kevin and Harry rue their plans for peace blowing up, with Kevin fearing the Harrigans' end is near. Harry, Zosia, and Kiko are dispatched to find Seraphina and Brendan, now in Antwerp for their diamond deal. Harry warns Bella against her plans a final time before leaving. An increasingly despondent Gina begs Jan to leave Harry and run after an uncomfortable encounter with Conrad. Maeve, with Eddie sitting in, then privately calls Richie with a deal, revealing a long-standing tie with the Stevenson crime boss. She offers up Seraphina as recompense, but to leave Brendan unharmed, giving up the duo's location. Richie's hired guns then descend upon the exchange site with Harry in pursuit, slaughtering everyone and holding Seraphina and Brendan at gunpoint.
7	7	"The Crossroads"	Lawrence Gough	Ronan Bennett and Jez Butterworth	11 May 2025
Harry arrives at the meeting with no sign of Brendan or Seraphina except for a chilling message from Richie, who has reneged on his arrangement with Maeve by taking Brendan. O'Hara informs the Harrigans that the police net around them is drawing closer, given the recent incidents. Maeve desperately tries to cover her tracks, as the urgency to find the family's mole increases. Bella works on a new deal with Antoine, while Kevin gets the address of the care home that Rusby was seen at from Maria. Jan leaves the estate to meet Alice, with Fisk and Mukasa remotely in tow, but the tailing Harrigan hand, Paul, intervenes, threatening Alice before he takes Jan back to the Cotswolds. Eddie and Gina grow close, and the two kiss. Harry massacres the Moroccans who had aided with Brendan and Seraphina's abduction, learning the duo's location at a warehouse in Amsterdam, where the Stevenson-affiliated Mexican cartel holds them. The cartel's leader, Jaime Lopez, arrives for the torture of Brendan and Seraphina, broadcast to the Harrigans via a video call from Richie, who, despite disparaging Maeve, does not give her up. Harry, unable to breach or reach the warehouse in time, caves and calls Donnie, who patches him through to Kat. Declaring that Harry now owes her, she manages to liaise with Jaime, but not before Brendan is executed.
8	8	"Helter Skelter"	Lawrence Gough	Ronan Bennett and Jez Butterworth	18 May 2025
Seraphina is safely returned to Harrigan's estate in the Cotswolds, where Harry reveals his deal and previous contact with Kat to Conrad, while stating his loyalty to the Harrigans. Colin Tattersall, a former senior organised crime officer, is brought in to assist Fisk and Mukasa. He suggests they make a deal with Richie rather than infiltrating the Harrigans. Conrad tasks Harry with gathering everything he has on the Stevensons, Jaime, and the fentanyl trade for a sit-down with Jaime, given his now tenuous relationship with Richie after Amsterdam. However, he wants Kat to broker the meeting, where an unsure Kevin questions Conrad's motives. Jan tells Harry about Gina and Eddie, who taunt him before being silenced by Harry's sincerity and an unnerving warning. Conrad confronts Jan about her meet-up with Alice, where he insists on speaking with her, eventually inviting her to dinner at the Harrigans'. Bella secures another meeting with Antoine, but is questioned by Conrad and asked to report on Kevin. The ever-manipulative Maeve sows discord between her remaining wards in the wake of Brendan's death. Harry meets with Freddie to squeeze him for more details on the Stevensons' fentanyl dealings, but throws him off a roof to his death after finding out about Archie's innocence and the identity of the family's mole. Kevin arrives at the nursing home and notes Rusby's scheduled visits to his wife. Harry attends a virtual meeting with Kat. She agrees to be the intermediary, but states that the favour wasn't granted to Conrad, but to Harry, who now owes her double. Fisk and Mukasa meet with Richie, but the Stevenson patriarch shoots them both dead in a set-up by Colin, who had been working for Richie the entire time.
9	9	"Beggars Banquet"	Anthony Byrne	Ronan Bennett and Jez Butterworth	25 May 2025
Eddie wakes to find Conrad urging a serious conversation, while Bella delays meeting Antoine by coercing Paul. Harry and Conrad prepare for a crucial negotiation with Jaime. Jan, concerned about Alice, informs Harry about a dinner she and Alice have planned with Conrad, prompting Harry to watch her. After DS Fisk and Mukasa are murdered, Colin takes over their operation, blackmailing Alice—real name Nicola—into continuing her undercover work despite her growing doubts. Meanwhile, Maeve, jealous of Gina's closeness to Eddie, warns her to stay away. Conrad, Seraphina, Harry, and Paul meet Jaime to negotiate. Seraphina presents the offer, but Jaime speaks only to Harry, respecting his reputation and past dealings with Kat, before promising to consider the proposal. Bella brokers a secret meeting between Antoine's Syrian client and the home secretary, which Antoine secretly records. Kevin, disguised as Rusby's driver, murders him in revenge for past abuse. Richie's plan unfolds: Alice's bugged phone will lead the police to arrest Conrad and Maeve, who will hand them over to him. Jaime agrees to a deal if the Harrigans eliminate their mole. During a tense confrontation, Conrad exposes Maeve as the true mole. After collecting evidence, Alice leaves as police arrest Conrad and Maeve.
10	10	"The Beast in Me"	Anthony Byrne	Ronan Bennett and Jez Butterworth	1 June 2025
Kevin confesses his traumas to Rusby's corpse, revealing Eddie is his brother, the child of Bella and Conrad. After Conrad and Maeve are arrested, Harry takes Kevin home and Kiko and Zosia clean up the blood-stained items in Rusby's home, while the family relocates to a forest safe house. O'Hara confesses to Harry that she worked with Richie to undermine the Harrigans, but is spared and tasked with arranging a meeting with Richie. Kevin visits his imprisoned father, declaring intent to take control of the family and blaming him and Maeve for their failings. Meanwhile, Maeve attempts to sway Eddie by blaming Harry and Seraphina, then reveals his parentage when that fails. Kat contacts Seraphina to discuss the family's uncertain future. Colin hands Alice over to Richie's men. O'Hara betrays the family's location, prompting an ambush—only to fall into Harry's trap. Paul's bombs kill Stevenson teams; Zosia and Kiko attack, though Kiko dies in the aftermath. Kevin and Harry assault Richie's pub, killing Richie, O'Hara, and their crew. Kat proposes a power-sharing future with Harry, but he refuses. Kevin has a similar moment with Bella, learning she knew everything, including her father's abuse. That night, feeling overwhelmed, Jan stabs Harry. After exiting his cell, the other prison inmates cheer Conrad.

=== Season 2 (2026) ===
No. overall	No. in season	Title	Directed by	Written by	Original release date
11	1	"I Wanna Be Your Dog"	Guy Ritchie	Jez Butterworth and Esther Watson	18 September 2026
Conrad, Maeve, Paul, and new enforcer, Fergus, attend a Greyhound race under the guise of a heroin deal with the Turkish gangster Luca Ruzgar, only to discover that he bypassed them to buy through Kevin instead. Enraged by Luca's insult, Conrad and Maeve brutally massacre Luca and his men. The fallout forces Harry to leave a couples therapy session with Jan. He uses Finch, a corrupt detective, to wipe the stadium's surveillance and coerces a waiter into retracting his first police statement and then fabricating a revised police statement. Harry warns Conrad and Kevin that Kat McAllister is manipulating the fractured family and persuades them to cease feuding. Jan serves Harry divorce papers. Zosia and enforcer Dog track Maeve to a meeting with Eddie, who is working with Gina to extort protection money from high-earning YouTubers. Harry ambushes and executes the Turkish mob boss, Gakbu Ruzgar. Before dying, he confirms Kat's involvement. Kat is appointed as the US Ambassador to the United Kingdom. She meets with Seraphina, who plots to overthrow Conrad, and Colin, who proposes hiring a ruthless "Paladin" to take out the Harrigans. Colin subsequently approaches the drug lord Frankie Cooper.
12	2	"Song 2"	Guy Ritchie	Jez Butterworth and Esther Watson	25 September 2026
Harry tails Eddie and Gina to learn the location of their hideout. Donnie rear-ends Jan's car, and they exchange numbers, but he uses a fake identity. During a health checkup, a doctor informs Conrad that the part of his brain that regulates aggression is weakening. Conrad forces the doctor to destroy the evidence and lies to Maeve about his whereabouts. Maeve convinces Conrad to invite Seraphina to dinner. DCI Kavanaugh investigates the death of the Turkish gangsters. She suspects the Harrigans' involvement and believes there is a mole in her investigative team. After Harry informs Jan about Gina's location, she tells Gina about the divorce. Donnie pays Jan for the damages to her car, and they agree to meet again. Maeve learns from a veterinarian that antifreeze can be a substitute for poison and she plans to use it on Seraphina. Donnie tells Seraphina not to attend the dinner. Colin sends Frankie to launch multiple coordinated attacks to weaken the Harrigans. Frankie's men simultaneously kill both Fergus and Eddie's henchmen, and kidnap Zosia. Harry saves Eddie and Gina from Frankie's men. Frankie kills Harrigan enforcers at Kevin's home and calls Conrad to taunt him while holding Bella at gunpoint.
13	3	"Bonzo Goes to Bitburg"	Lawrence Gough	Jez Butterworth and Esther Watson	2 October 2026
Harry and Kevin deal with the aftermath of Bella's kidnapping. Harry informs Conrad about the death of Fergus and their enforcers, prompting them to seek legal counsel, and Maeve blames Harry for the chaos. Kavanaugh investigates the deaths and requests surveillance footage, but Finch manipulates it to hide Harry's involvement. Released from captivity, Zosia relays Frankie's demand for a meeting at the Harrigan yard. Donnie pressures Seraphina to attend, warning that her absence will ruin their deal. She convinces Harry to let her join, and accidentally reveals Frankie's involvement. Maeve grants Eddie access to Conrad's pied-à-terre. After Eddie hosts a drug-fuelled party with Gina, Maeve catches them and sends them to Kenmare, Ireland. Jan and Donnie spend more time together and have sex. Frankie arrives at the yard and proposes a restructuring plan of North London's criminal underworld with him in charge and demands the executions of Conrad and Maeve. When Harry refuses, Kevin draws a gun, forcing Frankie to release Bella safely. A suspicious Harry questions Seraphina on how she knew about Frankie's involvement. After everyone departs, Dog finds a helmet left by Frankie. A hidden IED inside detonates, killing Dog and destroying the yard.
14	4	"Blank Curtain"	Lawrence Gough	Jez Butterworth and Esther Watson	9 October 2026
Following the yard explosion, which Finch covers up as a gas leak, Conrad accuses Harry of starting a war with Kat. He forces him to choose between his loyalty and Kevin's. Kavanagh uncovers tampered ballistics evidence and suspects that Finch was behind it. Conrad confronts Maeve after discovering the antifreeze. Seraphina confesses to Harry that she started working with Kat as a means of self-preservation. Conrad informs Gina about Harry's ruthless military past. Eddie and Gina then fly to Ireland. Harry discovers from another corrupt officer on his payroll that Kavanagh is suspicious of Finch. He executes a violent smash-and-grab jewellery heist using a flagged Harrigan-owned BMW. Harry later confronts Finch, who realises that Kavanagh has withheld information from him about the jewellery heist. With Finch compromised, Harry executes him in a secluded forest by hanging and stages it to appear as a suicide. Harry convinces Kevin to attend a family meeting at the Cotswolds. Frankie sends Harry a video of Jan and Donnie having sex. Conrad and Paul raid Frankie's yard, where Conrad kills several of his men, and they kidnap Frankie's enforcer Jojo.
15	5	"Birdland"	Zetna Fuentes	Jez Butterworth and Esther Watson	16 October 2026
Conrad brings Jojo back to the Cotswolds and tortures him for information. Harry later kills Jojo out of mercy. Kavanagh discovers Finch's body and believes he was killed since he was a loose end. Seraphina informs Donnie that all the Harrigans will be present at a meeting. Harry phones Jan about her affair with Donnie to tell her that she was being manipulated, but she does not believe him. Eddie and Gina arrive in Kenmare, and Paul overhears Maeve instructing Eddie to kill the Irish gangster Medusa, which Eddie keeps a secret from Gina. Kat gives Donnie the green light to have Frankie execute a coordinated ambush to kill all the Harrigans at once. Jan meets with Donnie, but becomes suspicious of him after noticing missed calls from Seraphina on his phone. Paul informs Harry about what he heard, and Harry quickly flies to Ireland. Eddie stalks Medusa to his home, but Medusa discovers and captures him. Harry arrives and kills Medusa and his men, saving Eddie and Gina. Seraphina attempts to warn the others as Frankie's men attack the Harrigans during their meeting, forcing them to abandon the Cotswolds and escape via helicopter.
16	6	"A Different Corner"	Zetna Fuentes	Jez Butterworth and Esther Watson	23 October 2026
The Harrigans board a private jet and flee the country. Frankie explores the Cotswolds and kills Conrad's dogs. Seraphina confesses to Conrad to working with Kat, who already knew the locations of their safehouses. She suggests they seek refuge with Priyanka, her mother. The Harrigans arrive at Priyanka's estate in Mallorca to find that Harry, Eddie, and Gina are already there. Harry tells Zosia to protect Jan while Frankie tells Colin to have Donnie kidnap her. Kavanagh and her team realise that the Harrigans are aware of their operation, and Kavanagh is demoted for her recklessness. Eddie takes credit for killing Medusa, but Maeve realises he is lying after he embellishes his retelling of Medusa's death. Harry warns Maeve not to put Gina in danger again. Jan calls Harry and threatens to kill herself if he contacts her again. Donnie attempts to reach Jan, but flees when Zosia and her men spot him. Seraphina proposes to Conrad that he ally with her billionaire stepfather Charlton to rebuild the Harrigan empire, but he refuses. Harry reconciles with Gina after he opens up to her. Jan agrees to meet Donnie, but never arrives. She then follows Donnie home and kills him.
17	7	"Ace of Spades"	Brady Hood	Jez Butterworth and Esther Watson	30 October 2026
After returning to the Cotswolds, Conrad buries his dogs, fortifies the estate, and unites the family. Kat gives Frankie a week to eliminate the Harrigans to prove his worth. Harry, Kevin, Conrad, and Paul intimidate and distribute protection money to various criminals and businesses to assert the Harrigans' dominance over London. Bella and Seraphina have a team of lawyers search for leverage against Kat. Maeve tries to manipulate Gina into attempting suicide so Harry will devote more time to her. Harry finds Donnie's body and Jan's gun, and has Zosia dispose of the body. Frankie uses Sicily, Paul's ex-girlfriend, to set a trap for Paul, leading to his kidnapping. Frankie forces Paul to call Harry to lure him into a trap, but Paul uses the codeword "bro" to warn Harry. Anticipating an ambush, Harry goes to Frankie's casino alone. Frankie kills Sicily and tries to convince Harry to switch allegiances. Harry counters Frankie by threatening his incarcerated son, Michael Cooper. Harry disarms Frankie after he plays two rounds of Russian roulette pointed at Harry's head. Frankie allows Harry and Paul to leave unharmed, with Harry holding Frankie at gunpoint. Harry then calls Michael to warn him of an impending hit.
18	8	"We Don't Talk Anymore"	Brady Hood	Jez Butterworth and Esther Watson	6 November 2026
At Colm "Medusa" O'Connor's funeral, his son Kelly "Mad Dog" O'Connor vows to avenge Medusa's death. Conrad shares his past with Eddie, how he killed his abusive stepfather and adopted the Harrigan name. Harry and Kevin take Paul to a secluded place at the Harrigan yard, making Paul believe he will be killed. Instead, they force Paul to dismember Donnie's body. Harry explains to Kevin that he warned Michael so he would be moved to solitary confinement. He then bribed a custodial manager and contracted two violent inmates to execute Michael. Harry informs Jan that he is aware of Donnie's murder and has dealt with Donnie's body. Maeve continues to manipulate Eddie and Gina. She humiliates Eddie by filming him apologising to her and warns Gina about Mad Dog's vengeance. Colin informs Kavanagh about a body hidden in a lake at the Cotswolds. Conrad pressures Kevin into discussing the future family leadership and reveals that he has been hallucinating people he has killed. Harry attempts to broker peace with Frankie, who is mourning Michael's death, but Frankie responds with a threat. Mad Dog watches CCTV footage of Eddie and Gina at a pub in Kenmare.
19	9	"Nervous Breakdown"	Lawrence Gough	Jez Butterworth and Esther Watson	13 November 2026
Frankie infiltrates a posh party, telling Kat the Harrigans will fall within 24 hours. After Gina flees the Cotswolds, Maeve orders Eddie to kill Harry. Using intel extracted by torturing Jojo, Conrad takes Maeve and sets out to hijack Frankie's drug shipment at Tilbury Docks. Seraphina accepts a diamond payment from Charlton to bankroll her own independent criminal enterprise. Harry kills several assassins Frankie sent after him and Jan. Frankie abducts Gina when she arrives to meet them. Seeking explosives, Eddie blackmails a reluctant Paul by threatening to expose Paul's betrayal to Maeve regarding Eddie's mission to Ireland. Before he can intercept the drug shipment, Conrad suffers auditory hallucinations. After refusing Kevin's proposed coup against Conrad and Maeve, Harry confronts Frankie alone to rescue Gina. As Frankie's men prepare to livestream Gina's execution, Harry threatens to brutally kill Frankie before his men can intervene. Frankie calls Kat, who informs Harry that the Harrigans are finished and offers Harry his old job back. After releasing Gina, Frankie lets Harry walk away. Eddie and Paul discover the police raiding the Cotswolds, while Colin and Kavanagh recover Jojo's corpse from the lake as Harry drives toward the house.
20	10	"The Queen Is Dead"	Lawrence Gough	Jez Butterworth and Esther Watson	20 November 2026
The Harrigans are added to a global terrorist watchlist. Tattersall orders police raids and the freezing of their bank accounts. The Harrigans regroup with Harry, Jan, and Gina at a safe house where family tensions reach a breaking point. After Kevin's proposed 50% deal is rejected, he shoots at Bella, narrowly missing her. To buy their freedom, Conrad and Seraphina plan to offer a €10 million bribe of untraceable diamonds to Kat. Harry promises Kat the gems, a fifty percent cut, his loyalty, and their location. However, Harry orchestrates a double-cross. When Frankie and his crew storm the safe house, Harry, Zosia, and Paul ambush them with mounted machine guns and eliminate them. They leave a wounded Frankie alive for Maeve to torture. Harry extorts Kat by having planted Donnie's severed head in the diamond courier bag. He threatens to expose her for accepting the gems from a terrorist organisation, forcing Kat to resign, unfreeze their accounts, and drop all investigations. The Harrigans regroup at the Cotswolds, where Eddie secretly plants a bomb under Harry's car seat. Startled by a threatening call from Mad Dog, Eddie drops the detonator, killing Jan in a fiery explosion as Harry and Gina watch.

== Production ==
=== Development ===
First season promotional poster

The series was first announced in February 2024 as The Donovans, a loosely based spinoff of the Showtime series Ray Donovan produced by MTV Entertainment Studios and 101 Studios, with Showtime/MTV executives Keith Cox and Nina L. Diaz and 101 Studios' David C. Glasser attached to the project. Ronan Bennett was hired to write the series and executive produce with Guy Ritchie, Ivan Atkinson, Glasser, Ron Burkle, Bob Yari and David Hutkin.

In October 2024, the series was announced to have been reworked into a series with the working title The Associate, with Tom Hardy, Pierce Brosnan, and Helen Mirren in final negotiations to star. Production began in November 2024 with Hardy, Brosnan and Mirren in London and the working title was removed. Jez Butterworth, Tom Hardy, Dean Baker and Kris Thykier joined as executive producers. In February 2025, the final title of the series, MobLand, was revealed.

On 23 June 2025, the series was renewed for a second season. In May 2026, a third season was confirmed to be in development. Hardy was initially reported to have departed the series after completing his work on the second season due to "friction" between him and showrunner Jez Butterworth. Later reports confirmed that Hardy "was not fired" from the series and that there were discussions about his return for a potential third season. The following month, Hardy was confirmed to return for the third season, alongside Brosnan and Mirren. On 3 September 2026, the series was renewed for a third season.

=== Casting ===
Tom Hardy, Pierce Brosnan and Helen Mirren signed on to star in the series in November 2024. Over the next month, Paddy Considine, Joanne Froggatt, Lara Pulver, Anson Boon, Mandeep Dhillon, Jasmine Jobson and Alex Fine were added to the cast. In February 2025, Geoff Bell, Daniel Betts, Lisa Dwan, and Emily Barber joined the cast. In March 2025, Janet McTeer joined the cast.

In December 2025, Johnny Flynn and Ophelia Lovibond joined the cast as series regulars for the second season.

=== Filming ===
Production on the series took place between November 2024 and March 2025 in London. At least six of the episodes in the series were written during production, and filming wrapped only four days before the premiere.

While filming, a bag of camera equipment was stolen from a set in East London. The thieves later returned and successfully stole more equipment, leading to the firing and replacement of the security team on set. During production, the set construction company, Helix 3D, went into bankruptcy, leaving several crew members with unpaid wages going into the Christmas holidays. Hardy initially offered to make up the difference before the production companies paid the workers instead.

=== Music ===
MobLand's music is composed by Muse's Matt Bellamy and composer Ilan Eshkeri. The show's theme song is "Starburster" by Fontaines D.C. The first and second episodes feature songs by the Prodigy, "Firestarter" and "Breathe" respectively.

== Release ==
MobLand premiered on Paramount+ on 30 March 2025, with episodes released weekly through 1 June 2025. The premiere broke the streamer's record for its largest global series launch ever, with 2.2 million viewers on 30 March. MobLand went on to accumulate over 26 million views in its first season, ranking it second on Paramount+ during that time behind only Landman. It also ranked in Nielsen's top 10 SVOD list, in the original series category, for six consecutive weeks.

The second season premiered on 18 September 2026.

== Reception ==
On the review aggregation website Rotten Tomatoes, the first season has an approval rating of 77% based on 44 critical reviews. The website's critical consensus reads, "Tom Hardy's gruff charisma is put to good use in MobLand, a gangster saga that hardly reinvents the genre but nails its conventions with crunchy style and memorable performances." On Metacritic, which uses a weighted average, the first season received a score of 60 out of 100, based on 18 critics, indicating "mixed or average" reviews.

On Rotten Tomatoes, the second season has an approval rating of 90% based on 21 critical reviews. The website's critical consensus reads, "MobLand proves to be Guy Ritchie at his utmost sinister, funny, and intriguing best, featuring a truly game A-list cast that only elevates the proceedings in this charming second season." On Metacritic, the second season received a score of 73 out of 100, based on 12 critics, indicating "generally favorable" reviews.
