= Daniel Betts =

British actor

- Born: Daniel Alexander Betts; 10 December 1971 (age 54); Cuckfield, West Sussex, England
- Occupation: Actor
- Years active: 1994–present

Daniel Alexander Betts (born 10 December 1971) is a British actor.

== Early life ==
Born in Cuckfield, West Sussex, he trained at the Drama Centre London.

== Career ==
As well as appearing in films Fury (2014), Allied (2016), War Machine (2017), Alien: Romulus (2024) he has also appeared in television programmes such as The Crown, The Bill, Cadfael, The Fixer, Sex Education and Fate: The Winx Saga.

He has been a voiceover artist on many commercials.

In 2025, he starred in the British crime drama television series MobLand, in a cast which included Tom Hardy, Pierce Brosnan, Helen Mirren, Paddy Considine, Joanne Froggatt, and Geoff Bell.

== Selected filmography ==
- The Canterville Ghost (1996), as Francis, Duke of Cheshire
- The Magical Legend of the Leprechauns (1999), as Mickey Muldoon
- Tom's Midnight Garden (1999) as Barty
- Fury (2014)
- Allied (2016) as George Kavanagh
- War Machine (2017)
- Alien: Romulus (2024)
- Here (2024), as William Franklin
- De Gaulle (2026), as Dwight D. Eisenhower

== Selected television ==
- Atlantic Crossing, as Harry Hopkins
- The Crown
- The Bill
- Cadfael, as Janyn
- The Fixer
- Sex Education
- Fate: The Winx Saga
- MobLand as Brendan Harrigan
