= Jane Slavin =

English actress and novelist (born 1970)

- Born: 11 March 1968 (age 57); Salford, Lancashire, England
- Occupation: Actress
- Years active: 1991–present

Jane Slavin (born 11 March 1970) is an English actress and novelist. Slavin was the winner of the 1989 BBC Radio Drama Carleton Hobbs Award. She has appeared on television in Lewis, Doctors as Gayle Buckley, Peak Practice, Always and Everyone, Coronation Street and in the Doctor Who full-cast radio drama The Paradise of Death alongside the third Doctor, Jon Pertwee. Slavin has also been a series regular in The Bill, Wycliffe, Maigret, Clocking Off, Casualty and Heartbeat.

She has also recorded several Big Finish productions of Doctor Who with the fourth Doctor, Tom Baker and the tenth Doctor, David Tennant, playing the role of companion Ann Kelso, later revealed to be Anya Kingdom, daughter of the late companion Sara Kingdom. The stories were released in January 2019. Her theatre roles include Poopay in Alan Ayckbourn's Communicating Doors at the Savoy Theatre (in London's West End), and All Things Considered (Hampstead Theatre). She was Juliet in Romeo and Juliet in a world tour for the English Shakespeare Company directed by Michael Bogdanov and famously fell off the balcony at the first preview. Her novel Writing on the Water was published in 2003 by Transworld/Black Swan.
