= The Bullshitters: Roll Out the Gunbarrel =

- Written by: Keith Allen; Peter Richardson
- Directed by: Stephen Frears
- Starring: Keith Allen; Peter Richardson; Robbie Coltrane

Production
- Executive producer: Michael White
- Producer: Elaine Taylor
- Running time: 40 minutes

Original release
- Release: 3 November 1984

The Bullshitters: Roll Out the Gunbarrel is a 1984 medium-length TV film directed by Stephen Frears. A spoof of the TV series The Professionals, it was first broadcast in 1984 on Channel 4.

Although it was made by many people behind The Comic Strip, the film did not feature the Comic Strip title sequence, and is not considered by some to be part of the series. However, it was included in The Comic Strip DVD box set (2005), and its lead characters, Bonehead and Foyle reappeared in a later short Comic Strip film, Detectives on the Edge of a Nervous Breakdown. It was also represented as an episode of the show on 30 Years of The Comic Strip.

== Synopsis ==
Commander Jackson (Robbie Coltrane), head of DI5, hears that his daughter Janie has been kidnapped and held for ransom. He calls in ex-agents Bonehead (Keith Allen) and Foyle (Peter Richardson) to save her. Since being kicked out of DI5, Bonehead works at a TV Tough Guys School, teaching others the "rules" of being a "TV tough guy", and Foyle is now an actor on stage. Jackson blackmails the two into working together.

== Cast ==
- Keith Allen as Bonehead
- Peter Richardson as Martin Foyle
- Robbie Coltrane as Commander George Jackson
- Alana Pellay as Herself
- Jimmy Fagg as Himself
- Fiona Hendley as Janie Jackson
- Al Matthews as Admiral
- George Khan as Thompson
- Kevin Allen as KNOBS Student Chuck
- Gary Martin as KNOBS Student Stig
- John Sarbutt as KNOBS Student Dean
- David Farrington as KNOBS Student David Farrington
- Anthony Sharp as West End Play Father
- Michael White as Himself
- Elvis Costello as Stone Deaf A&R Man
