= Detectives on the Edge of a Nervous Breakdown =

- Written by: Keith Allen & Peter Richardson
- Directed by: Keith Allen; Peter Richardson
- Starring: Keith Allen; Peter Richardson; Jim Broadbent; Phil Cornwell; Jim Carter
- Country of origin: United Kingdom

Production
- Running time: 32 minutes

Original release
- Release: 3 April 1993

Detectives on the Edge of a Nervous Breakdown is a short comedy film made by The Comic Strip for the BBC, first broadcast in the UK in 1993.

The film employs techniques of metafictional parody to make overt critical comparisons between 1990s TV detective shows and their 1970s counterparts. The editorial line taken throughout the film presents a very affectionate portrayal of several of these 1970s shows, despite acknowledging their use of styles and methods that had since become somewhat clichéd.

The title parodies the title of the 1988 film Women on the Verge of a Nervous Breakdown.

== Major characters ==
=== Bonehead and Foyle ===
Writer-directors Keith Allen and Peter Richardson revive their characters Bonehead and Foyle from the 1984 Comic Strip film The Bullshitters, which was itself a parody of The Professionals.

As in the previous film, Bonehead and Foyle attach great importance to guns, witty one-liners and self-conscious efforts at looking un-self-consciously good on-screen. They manoeuvre and park their car – a Ford Capri, as used in The Professionals – with almost exclusive use of handbrake turns, and during the film's climax they concentrate on seeking out piles of boxes to drive through or puddles to splash through, in order to make their shots appear more dynamic.

For the second half of the film they again appear without shirts and, finally, without trousers.

=== George ===
Introduced as "Shouting George from The Weeny", George is based on Jack Regan of The Sweeney. He is played by Jim Broadbent.

George uses London slang extensively, shouts, chain-smokes and insists on calling his commanding officer "guv". His detective methods involve visiting East End "villains' drinkers" in search of information. In common with Bonehead and Foyle he drives and parks his car – a 1970s Ford Granada, as seen in The Sweeney – recklessly.

=== Jason Bentley ===
Jason Bentley of Department Z is a parody of Department S's Jason King, and is played by Peter Richardson.

Shown to be running a 1970s retro clothes shop (Flares 'R' Us), Bentley dresses in red and purple crushed velvet suits. Bentley drives a vintage Bentley (as does Jason King) at a very leisurely, relaxed speed, since he ofttimes has a glass of claret in one hand. He bemoans this may eventually become illegal.

In solving crimes, Bentley prefers to make no visible effort at all, since he anticipates that all the plot devices required to solve the case will arrive by themselves in due course.

Peter Wyngarde, interviewed on BBC TV when this episode was originally transmitted, was flattered by the parody but insisted that Jason King would never wear crushed velvet.

=== Dave Spanker ===
Dave Spanker, played by Phil Cornwell is based on the eponymous lead character from Spender.

He is unshaven with untidy shoulder-length hair, but he wears "expensive Armani suits". In action, he is dour, slow-moving and speaks very little, except in nostalgic non-sequiturs about shipbuilding on the Tyne. Upon arrival at all locations he prefers to stand gazing out of an available window. The writers draw attention to the fact that he always sensibly parks and central-locks his Ford Sierra.

There is some crossover between the parodying of the Spender character and the actor who played him, Jimmy Nail, as when a musical number ends with a line from Nail's 1992 single, "Ain't No Doubt".

== Plot ==
The film opens on the studio set of a fictional 1990s TV show, The Gourmet Detective. This is depicted as a crass cross-genre detective/cookery series ("two recipes and one murder per show"), whose lead character (played by Keith Allen) presents his recipe in a style that parodies Keith Floyd. Allen's "on-screen" Gourmet Detective character is the epitome of politically correct "new man" compassion, but the actor "off-screen" is shown to be an obnoxious, drug-taking womaniser. He is subsequently murdered – the second TV detective to be killed in six months – and the rest of the film involves the search for his assassin.

The police commander (played by Jim Carter) is exasperated that the detective assigned to the case, Dave Spanker, has come up with much "Northern nostalgia" but no leads. Cheesecloth and the footprint of a 1970s platform shoe are found at the scene, inspiring him to bring in 1970s-style detectives to help solve the crime – initially Bonehead, Foyle and George. When the platform shoe is revealed to be from the early 1970s, Jason Bentley is added to the team, and the commander insists that Bentley's methods alone are to be used ("no guns, no fast cars, no shouting"). Bentley consequently drives the detectives to a random country house, drinks copious claret, smokes endless cigarettes, and predictably gets nowhere with the case. The frustrated detectives have a punch-up while they are – on Bentley's advice – "waiting for a Mini Moke to turn up".

The commander gives the team a dressing-down, and explains that, with the TV-cop-killer still at large, the production of various 1990s TV cop shows is under threat. In order to highlight further the writers' views of contemporary TV detective shows, he lists these as The Dull as Dishwater Detective, Detectives on the Verge of a Nervous Breakdown and The Whistling Detective Who Lives on a Barge. The Dull as Dishwater Detective is apparently in hiatus because "the actor's run abroad, he's scared" – a reference to the real TV series Inspector Morse, whose lead actor John Thaw was making A Year in Provence at this time. Thaw had previously played Regan in The Sweeney.

Bonehead, Foyle and George insist they be allowed to proceed with the investigation their way, complete with fast cars and guns. The commander reluctantly agrees to give them 48 hours, and they gleefully wheel-spin away to a rendezvous at an East End drinking den. Meanwhile, a sheepish Bentley asks to see the original lab reports.

At the pub, George asks to see his informant, while Bonehead and Foyle order Babychams then storm the toilet cubicles the way they might storm an embassy. However, Bentley provides the breakthrough. He reveals that the forensic report proves the platform shoes were bought in Newcastle upon Tyne. After Spanker confesses that he committed the crimes due to TV ratings pressure, he makes his escape.

There ensues a 1970s-style high-speed car chase involving all but Bentley, based mainly in a large yard where all three cars drive around somewhat pointlessly in circles. The repeated handbrake-turns wreck Foyle's gearbox and, in frustration at missing out on the car chase, Bonehead briefly considers leaving his partner. However, the chase continues on foot into London Docklands, where Spanker takes refuge.

Bonehead and Foyle – as is customary for them – remove their trousers for this final showdown, and then bemoan the Docklands redevelopment that has taken place since the 1970s: "where's all the wasteland and disused factories?". They nevertheless negotiate the area trouserlessly as if it is still full of rusty girders and rubble, to the bemusement of passing city workers.

Meanwhile, George attempts to talk Spanker into a surrender. Spanker complains that, with the increased realism in TV detective shows, he has missed out on the fast cars and the "shoot a man at a hundred yards crap" enjoyed by his 1970s counterparts. To prove the point, he feels no ill effects when George shoots him from this very distance as an apparent 1970s denouement to the scene. However, Bentley now magically appears exactly where the plot requires him to appear, right alongside Spanker. In a typically relaxed and tangential fashion, he manages to capture the detective effortlessly.

George devises a punishment for Spanker far worse than being shot at close range – Spanker will instead be "shot on tape". He has his scruffy hair cut to a regulation police constable's length, in order to take his place as "a faceless copper in uniform – three nights a week". Spanker's suitably TV-based punishment is to become a member of the cast of The Bill.

The film ends on an up-beat note, with Bonehead, Foyle, George, Bentley and the commander all drinking to "the Seventies".

== Cast and crew ==
- Keith Allen as Bonehead/The Gourmet Detective
- Peter Richardson as Foyle/Jason Bentley
- Jim Broadbent as George
- Phil Cornwell as Dave Spanker
- Jim Carter as Commander
- Gary Beadle as Ronnie
- John Forgeham as Sergeant
- Sara Stockbridge as Sonia
- Virginia Fiol as Mandy
- Michael White as TV executive
- Howie Nicol as TV executive
- Mark Caven as TV producer
- George Yiasoumi as Writer
- Doon Mackichan as Journalist
- Emma Bernard as Journalist
- Jimmy Fagg as East End drinker landlord
- Kevin Allen as Man in East End drinker (uncredited)
- Richard Vernon as Suspect at country house (uncredited)
- Lewis Collins as PR man at after show drinks party (uncredited)
- Written and directed by Keith Allen and Peter Richardson
- Producer – Lolli Kimpton
- Executive Producer – Michael White

== Home media ==
The film is included on the Comic Strip DVD box set The Complete Collection (2005).
