= Robyn Kershaw =

Australian film and television producer

- Born: Perth, Western Australia, Australia
- Occupations: Film, television producer
- Years active: Theatre: 1989–1994; Film & TV: 1998–present
- Website: rkershawproductions.com

Robyn Kershaw is an Australian independent film and television producer, best known for her work on feature drama, Looking for Alibrandi (2000), musical-comedy, Bran Nue Dae (2009), the hit TV series Kath & Kim (original run: 2002–2005) and working with the YouTube sensation Mychonny on Sucker (2015), Mychonny Moves In (2015) and The China Boy Show (2017).

== Career ==
Robyn Kershaw's career in the arts began in theatre production.

From 1989 to 1994, Kershaw was general manager of Belvoir St Theatre in Sydney, where she produced the projects of some of Australia's most well-known film artists, including Geoffrey Rush and Toni Collette. Four years later, she started her own production companies, Robyn Kershaw Productions and RKPix.

In 2001, Kershaw became the Head of Drama and Narrative Comedy for the Australian Broadcasting Corporation (ABC) during which time she executive produced over 140 hours of TV including the smash comedy hit, Kath & Kim (series 1, 2 and 3), created by and starring Jane Turner, Gina Riley and Magda Szubanski. Kath & Kim, became the highest rated TV comedy in Australia and the highest rated show on ABC from 2002 to 2004. Kershaw also executive produced the award-winning drama series, MDA, which received the first nomination for an ABC drama from the International Emmys.

In 2004, Kershaw returned to independent production to focus her efforts on RKP and RKPix.

=== Robyn Kershaw Productions and RKPix ===
In 1998, Kershaw founded and continues to act as both company director and producer for both Robyn Kershaw Productions Pty Ltd (RKP) and RKPix Pty Ltd, based in Australia. Robyn Kershaw Productions is a film and television production company.

Kershaw's first feature film was the adaptation of the best selling novel Looking for Alibrandi (2000). Written by Melina Marchetta (adapted from her own novel), directed by Kate Woods and starring Anthony LaPaglia, Greta Scacchi and Pia Miranda, Looking for Alibrandi was a box office hit in Australia and won five Australian Film Institute Awards, including Best Film and Best Actress.

Kershaw went on to produce box office hit, Bran Nue Dae (2009), directed by Rachel Perkins and starring Geoffrey Rush, Jessica Mauboy and Magda Szubanski. Bran Nue Dae was screened at over 20 film festivals and won the Audience Award at both the Melbourne International and the London Australian Film Festivals.

In February 2013, Kershaw released the Indian Australian cricket comedy, Save Your Legs! in Australia through Madman Entertainment. Save Your Legs! was directed by Boyd Hicklin and stars Stephen Curry, Brendan Cowell and Damon Gameau. The film was shown at the 2012 Melbourne International Film Festival, the BFI London Film Festival and the Mumbai Film Festival.

Kershaw executive produced My Mistress, released through Transmission Films. My Mistress was directed by Stephen Lance and stars Emmanuelle Beart, Harrison Gilbertson, Rachael Blake, and Socratis Otto. The film was premiered at the 2014 Melbourne International Film Festival.

In 2015, Kershaw produced the feature comedy Sucker co-written by Ben Chessell and Lawrence Leung, starring Timothy Spall and the YouTube sensation John Luc. The film was premiered at the 2015 Melbourne International Film Festival.

In 2022 was a producer on the Dollhouse Pictures Produced feature comedy Seriously Red, written by and starring Krew Boylan and featuring Celeste Barber, Rose Byrne, Thomas Campbell, Bobby Cannavale, and Daniel Webber. The film premiered at the 2022 SXSW Film Festival.

=== Organisations ===
Kershaw has served on the boards of the Australian Film Finance Corporation (now known as Screen Australia) and ScreenWest Australian screen funding and development agencies.

== Filmography ==
Year	Title	Role	Director	Notes
1996	Children of the Revolution (feature)	Casting director	Peter Duncan	
2000	Looking for Alibrandi (feature)	Producer	Kate Woods	Australian Film Institute (AFI) Awards – 2000 – Best Film, Best Adapted Screenplay, Best Actress, Best Supporting Actress and Best Editing
2000	Bondi Banquet (TV series)	Producer	Ray Argall; Stuart McDonald; Kay Pavlou	AWGIE Award – 2000 – Best Original TV Script
2001	Effie: Just Quietly (TV series)	Producer	Warren Coleman; Shawn Seet	
2001–2004	Grass Roots (TV series); Secret Bridesmaids' Business (telemovie); Loot (telemovie); The Shark Net (mini-series); The Forest (short feature); MDA (TV series 1 & 2); Marking Time (mini-series); Kath & Kim (TV series 1, 2 & 3)	Executive producer	All produced at ABC	Marking Time – 2004 – Winner of 7 AFIs Kath & Kim – 2002 – Winner of 3 AFIs – Best Drama Series, Best Screenplay in a Television Drama Series, Best Supporting Actress in a Television Drama MDA – 2002 – Nominated for International Emmy
2009	Bran Nue Dae (feature)	Producer	Rachel Perkins	MIFF – 2010 – Audience Award; London Australian Film Festival – 2010 – Audience Award
2012	Save Your Legs (feature)	Producer	Boyd Hicklin	
2014	My Mistress (feature)	Executive producer	Stephen Lance	
2014	MyChonny Moves In (TV mini-series)	Producer	Kate Woods	
2015	Sucker (feature)	Producer	Ben Chessell	
2017	Lets See How Fast This Baby Will Go (short)	Executive producer	Julietta Boscolo	
2017	The Chinaboy Show (TV series)	Producer	Trilby Glover	
2022	Seriously Red (feature)	Producer	Gracie Otto	
