= The Pope Must Die =

1991 British film by Peter Richardson

The Pope Must Diet!
- Canadian video poster for The Pope Must Die, renamed The Pope Must Diet!
- Directed by: Peter Richardson
- Written by: Peter Richardson; Pete Richens
- Produced by: Stephen Woolley; Michael White
- Starring: Robbie Coltrane; Beverly D'Angelo; Herbert Lom; Paul Bartel; Salvatore Cascio; Balthazar Getty; Alex Rocco
- Cinematography: Frank Gell
- Edited by: Katherine Wenning
- Music by: Jeff Beck; Anne Dudley
- Production companies: Palace Pictures; Channel Four Films
- Distributed by: Palace Pictures
- Release date: 31 August 1991
- Running time: 97 minutes
- Country: United Kingdom
- Language: English
- Budget: £2.5 million
- Box office: £1.1 million $582,510 (US)

The Pope Must Die (alternative known title as The Pope Must Diet! in the United States and Canada) is a 1991 British comedy film directed by Peter Richardson, who also wrote the screenplay with Pete Richens derived from elements of an earlier screenplay for a three-part mini-series satirising the Catholic Church, and which had been rejected by Channel 4. The film stars Robbie Coltrane as a low ranking priest who is mistakenly elected Pope, then has to avoid being assassinated by the Mafia. The film co-stars Adrian Edmondson, Annette Crosbie, Herbert Lom and Alex Rocco. The film was released by Palace Pictures with the backing of Channel 4 Films.

The film was originally planned as a part of a three-part mini-series for Channel 4, which was cancelled by the station after press outcry. This led Richardson to sever his long relationship with Channel 4 and move his future productions to the BBC. The budget for the film was later approved by Palace Pictures with the backing of Channel 4 Films. The production was filmed in 1990 in Yugoslavia on a budget of £2.5 million.

The film's subject matter was controversial, which caused the distributors serious difficulties with its promotion, London Transport refusing to carry advertising for it until the film's posters were censored. In the United States the Big Three television networks refused to show commercials for the film, which they said was sacrilegious and offensive. Many newspapers in the US also censored or refused to carry advertising for the film.

== Plot ==
The death of the previous Pope is followed by a conclave deadlocked for 25 days, until the Mafia's tame Cardinal Rocco persuades the College of Cardinals to elect in absentia the Mafia's favoured candidate, Albini (Janez Vajevec), whose absence Rocco passes off as him working tirelessly for environmental concerns.

Fr. Rookie is hard of hearing and records the pope-elect as "Cardinal Albinizi". Cardinal David "Dave" Albinizi is an honest parish priest who becomes Pope and takes the name of Pope David I. He is an unorthodox priest, with a benign interest in cars, women and rock and roll. He had worked in an orphanage, where he took an interest in caring for the children and wished them to enjoy the gospel, as opposed to the curmudgeonly nuns who believed misery is deserved. Inside the Vatican, the Pope gets along with Bish, a priest in charge of coordinating his security, and with the nun assigned to bring his meals. He considers abdicating after a failed assassination attempt but is convinced by the nun to stay. After a journalist asks about corruption inside the Vatican bank the Pope demands to see the accounts. Upon the previous pope's death Bish had received a disk about the financial irregularities which he gives to the pope. The Pope discovers the gun-smuggling and stolen merchandise operations, and has Rocco defrocked. Rocco has his mafia backers intensify the efforts to assassinate Pope David.

Looking with the papal chamberlain Monsignor Fitchie for material with which to blackmail the Pope, Cardinal Rocco finds that before joining the priesthood, Albinizi fathered a son with American tourist Veronica Dante. Albinizi joined the priesthood because Veronica did not want to stay with him. Veronica never informed Albinizi of their son, who is now rock star Joe Don Dante, dating Vittorio Corelli's daughter Luccia. Corelli doesn't approve of the relationship and sends thugs to kill Joe. The bomb kills Luccia and seriously wounds Joe. Pope David learns about his son and visits him before Joe dies.

Learning that the Vatican Bank is a tool of the Mafia, Pope David has it dissolved. He is forced to resign when his affair is revealed, and Corelli's candidate Albini is elected Pope. Corelli and Albini move into the papal apartments. Albinizi reunites with Veronica and finds out that the orphanage where he worked has closed. He reads about Albini becoming pope and rushes back to the Vatican and asks Bish for help to stop the coronation. They encounter a dying Cardinal Rocco, shot by Corelli. While Bish continues to the papal apartments, Albinizi hears Rocco's confession (interrupted by a phone call from Rocco's female partner). Albinizi finds Bish tied up, but Bish tells Albinizi to stop the imminent coronation rather than freeing him. Monsignor Fitchie frees Bish as Albinizi rushes to the Sistine Chapel just before the ceremony ends, and reveals that the man calling himself Albini is actually Corelli in disguise. Corelli declares himself "Pope Vittorio I, Emperor of the Vatican" and draws a gun. He fires a few shots at the ceiling, which collapses onto him. The nun who had served Albinizi as pope is chosen as the first female Pope in history. She announces she will give the Vatican's gold to the world's poor, and gives her blessing for Albinizi to take a bride. Bish officiates at Albinizi and Veronica's wedding. They adopt the children from the orphanage in addition to having children of their own.

== Cast ==
- Robbie Coltrane as Father C. David "Dave" Albinizi / The Pope (Pope David I)
- Alex Rocco as Cardinal Rocco
- Adrian Edmondson as Father Rookie
- Paul Bartel as Monsignor Fitchie
- Peter Richardson as Bish
- Annette Crosbie as Mother Superior
- Herbert Lom as Vittorio Corelli
- Beverly D'Angelo as Veronica Dante
- Khedija Sassi as Luccia Corelli
- Balthazar Getty as Joe Don Dante
- Mirta Zecevic as unnamed nun/The Popess
- Janez Vajevec as Father Albini
- Salvatore Cascio as Paulo
- Tibor Belicza as Priest in Secretariat
- John Sessions as Dino

== Production ==
=== Development ===
In 1988, Richardson pitched a proposal for a three-part mini-series to Channel 4's Commissioning Editor for Entertainment, Seamus Cassidy. The script, co-written with Pete Richens was based around the conspiracy theories surrounding the deaths of Pope John Paul I and "God's Banker" Roberto Calvi. At the planning stages Alexei Sayle was proposed to star as 'Pope Dave the First' and Robbie Coltrane, Jennifer Saunders and Dawn French were also said to be involved. The Observer reported "The programmes would have been in the form of a parody of an American mini-series, which portrayed a modern-day Pope and his rule across two continents." The budget was said to be tabled at £1.5 million.

Plans for the series were discovered by the press, and on 28 August 1988 The Sunday Times ran a short article entitled "Row over papal satire". The story was taken up by Catholic Herald, The Universe, The Observer and the Sun, linking the project to the furore over Martin Scorsese's The Last Temptation of Christ which at the time had been boycotted by the Catholic Church. Cassidy took soundings from senior colleagues including Chief Executive Michael Grade, and Director of Programmes, Liz Forgan. Spokespeople from Channel 4 at first defended the production, denying it would be blasphemous, but when they came under increasing scrutiny they cancelled the project after advice from their lawyers. Instead they decided to commission one of Richardson's pet projects, a sequel to the "Five Go Mad..." Comic Strip films, entitled, "Five Go To Hell". This project had originally been shelved due to the poor box office takings of Richardson's previous film Eat The Rich. However Five Go To Hell to date has never been filmed.

After the controversy, Richardson took the Comic Strip Presents to the BBC, reportedly because Alan Yentob was more accommodating to his ideas. He began work on another series of Comic Strip films for the channel. Two parts of the mini series were heavily re-written and appeared as episodes of the 1990 Comic Strip series, as Oxford and Spaghetti Hoops (which featured the story of Roberto Calvi). The remainder of the material was also rewritten and submitted to Palace Pictures, who produced the film with the backing of Channel 4. A production budget of £2.5 million was approved.

=== Filming ===
Filming began in late 1990. and took place on location in Yugoslavia, where John Ebden, the production designer, constructed studio sets of the Sistine Chapel and other Vatican landmarks. The title of the film was deemed too sensitive to be disclosed to the Yugoslavians; its working title was "Sleeping With the Fishes."

== Release ==
The film opened on 21 June 1991 in 170 screens across the United Kingdom. It took £534,614 in its opening week and went on to earn over £1.1 million ($1,737,740) on its UK release. It was released in the U.S. on 2 September 1991 on a limited release across 169 screens, taking $264,147 on opening week and grossing $582,510. The film also had limited distribution in Germany where it grossed DEM 367,603 ($224,520). The film struggled to make back its £2.5 million budget, grossing $2,544,770 overall (approximately £1.7 million).

=== Marketing ===
Daniel Battsek (then managing director of Palace Pictures, which produced the film) experienced trouble over the film's promotion, when London Transport banned the movie's posters from the London Underground. 'At first they said the theme of the film was liable to cause offense," said Battsek. "When I explained the story, they admitted it was the title. We compromised with a poster saying "Robbie Coltrane in The Pope."' The film also caused controversy when it opened in the Republic of Ireland that August. The film encountered more serious problems with promotion on its US release, with many newspapers refusing to include adverts, and CBS, NBC and ABC refusing to air television adverts for the film. Reasons cited for this were the sacrilegious tone of the film and advertising and the possible offence this would cause to readers and audiences. A CBS spokesperson said "The decision was made because the title and content would be offensive to a significant portion of our audience." whilst NBC responded "We feel (our viewers) would be seriously offended due to the ads' sacrilegious nature" 12 other cities newspapers accepted advertising only after the content had been heavily censored. The Washington Post accepted an advert that read "The Pope Must. . . ." The Los Angeles Times requested changes in certain captions under photos in the ad. The Chicago Tribune and Sun-Times and The New York Times were among the few newspapers which accepted advertising without alterations.

"There is a separation of church and state in this country. My question is, on what grounds have they banned these ads? It seems curious that all three (networks) are taking the same tack," said Russell Schwartz, Miramax executive vice president. "Obviously they can do what they want, they are private institutions. It just raises some interesting issues as to why, when it comes to religion, the response is so unilateral."

=== Critical reception ===
On its limited release in the United States, the film received mixed reviews. Roger Ebert of the Chicago Sun-Times wrote "The movie's basic comic approach is disrespect for the church, which almost by definition cannot be funny. To deflate a comic character, it has to first be inflated, and The Pope Must Die makes the crucial error of denying its characters dignity - so that there's no reason for us to laugh when it's taken away from them." Although he conceded "Robbie Coltrane is a British comic actor of genuine talent, but he seems under a compulsion to make bad comedies about the Catholic church" Vincent Canby of The New York Times was more enthusiastic, writing "The film is irreverent, boisterous and enjoyable even when the gags hang fire." He also praised Coltrane's performance, saying he "is very good, but the performance is somewhat restrained by the screenplay's demand that the character ultimately be heroic. In this kind of comedy, rascality gets most of the laughs." The Time Out film guide article says "There are many good laughs, albeit of a rather simple-minded nature, but even by its own ludicrous standards the plot unravels helplessly towards the end" and called the film "A pontiff's egg." (a play on the phrase a curate's egg). The film has a 33% (rotten) rating at Rotten Tomatoes, based on six reviews.
