= Human Nature (Gary Clail On-U Sound System song) =

- Variant for CD and vinyl editions

Single by Gary Clail On-U Sound System

from the album Emotional Hooligan
- B-side: "Rumours"
- Released: 1991
- Genre: Dance; dub; house
- Length: 3:40
- Label: Perfecto; RCA
- Songwriter: Gary Clail
- Producer: Adrian Sherwood

Gary Clail On-U Sound System singles chronology
"Beef" (1990)	"Human Nature" (1991)	"The Emotional Hooligan" (1991)

Music video
- "Human Nature" on YouTube

"Human Nature" is a song performed and written by English singer and record producer Gary Clail. It is produced by Adrian Sherwood and features Lana Pellay on backing vocals. Released in 1991 by Perfecto and RCA Records as the first single from Clail's second album, Emotional Hooligan (1991), it was critically acclaimed, being named Single of the Week by Melody Maker and Record Mirror. The song peaked at number ten on the UK Singles Chart and was also the theme tune to BBC 2's TV-show Snub TV.

It was originally intended to use a sample of a speech by Billy Graham on the track, but his representatives refused permission, so the song used portions of the speech re-recorded by Clail. However, some promo 12" singles featuring the Billy Graham sample were pressed and distributed.

== Chart performance ==
"Human Nature" peaked at number ten on the UK Singles Chart, number three on the Music Week UK Dance Singles chart and number one on the Record Mirror Club Chart. It also reached number 27 in Ireland and number 69 in the Netherlands. On the Eurochart Hot 100, the single peaked at number 29 in April 1991. Outside Europe, it peaked at number 38 in Australia.

== Critical reception ==
Andrew Smith from Melody Maker named 'Human Nature' Single of the Week, writing, "The surprise is that this is, in essence, a house groove fed through the On-U blender and wrapped raucously round a sample of Martin Luther King declaring: "There's something wrong with human nature..." It's a big, vibrant linear thing, which kicks like a 12-gauge and locks onto its ultimately enthralling climax from the first, like a modern day 'Bolero' (only, of course, much less dull)." Pan-European magazine Music & Media complimented it as an "outstanding" song from the Emotional Hooligan album. James Hamilton from Music Week called it a "bassily chugging angry roller".

James Brown from NME described it as "another electrifying club track that brings the old On-U Sound up to date and bullies the social conscience with its words. Boxheads will recognize its staple technique as being the Snub signature tune, but of course there's more. Comic strip-per Lana Pellay adds a Bacchanalian chorus call, and Sherwood and Oakenfold do the business at the controls. Light, tight, and destined to beat up the charts. The man has presence." Record Mirror also named it Single of the Week. An editor, Jack Barron, wrote, "With all the momentum of a nailbomb explosion in the privates, Gary Clail spins once more into orbit riding on the back of a stellar keyboard riff, which you'll instantly recognise as the theme tune to Snub TV". He added, "As a purely physical club experience, 'Human Nature' is like strapping yourself to a roller-coaster that suddenly leaves the rails."

== Legacy ==
In 2017, Australian Double J ranked "Human Nature" number six in their list of "The 50 Most Overlooked Songs of the 90s". Myf Warhurst wrote, "Francis Leach got me hooked on Gary Clail and the On-U Sound System. I recorded a live set he presented on triple j (on cassette of course) and played this song on repeat in my car until the tape broke. I was at that point in life when I was wide eyed and eager to learn about club culture, its many fascinating inhabitants and the hedonistic lifestyle that came with it. It also was my gateway drug to the burgeoning Bristol scene and its pulsating beat still speaks to me of those heady days (and nights)."

== Track listing ==
- 7" single, UK & Europe (1991)
1. "Human Nature" (On the Mix Edit)
2. "Human Nature" (Why Is It? Mix)
- 12" single, Europe (1991)
1. "Human Nature" (On the Mix) — 6:18
2. "Rumours" — 4:40
- CD single, UK & Europe (1991)
1. "Human Nature" (On the Mix Edit) — 3:40
2. "Human Nature" (On the Mix) — 6:18
3. "Rumours" — 4:40

== Charts ==
=== Weekly charts ===
Chart (1991)	Peak position
Australia (ARIA)	38
Europe (Eurochart Hot 100)	29
Ireland (IRMA)	27
Israel (Israeli Singles Chart)	6
Netherlands (Dutch Top 40 Tipparade)	16
Netherlands (Single Top 100)	69
UK Singles (OCC)	10
UK Airplay (Music Week)	18
UK Dance (Music Week)	3
UK Club Chart (Record Mirror)	1

=== Year-end charts ===
Chart (1991)	Position
UK Singles (OCC)	94
UK Club Chart (Record Mirror)	12
