= Churchill: The Hollywood Years =

- Theatrical release poster
- Directed by: Peter Richardson
- Written by: Peter Richardson; Pete Richens
- Produced by: Jonathan Cavendish; Ben Swaffer
- Starring: Christian Slater; Neve Campbell; Miranda Richardson; Antony Sher; Romany Malco; Harry Enfield; Rik Mayall; Vic Reeves; Bob Mortimer; Phil Cornwell; Jessica Oyelowo; Steve Pemberton; Steven O'Donnell; James Dreyfus; Mackenzie Crook; Sally Phillips; Leslie Phillips
- Cinematography: Cinders Forshaw
- Edited by: Geoff Hogg; John Wilson
- Music by: Simon Boswell
- Production companies: Sky Movies; UK Film Council; Isle of Man Film Limited; Little Bird; Inside Track; Absolutely Productions
- Distributed by: Pathé Distribution
- Release date: 3 December 2004
- Running time: 84 minutes
- Countries: United Kingdom; Ireland
- Language: English
- Box office: £529,546

Churchill: The Hollywood Years is a 2004 comedy film directed by Peter Richardson, who co-wrote the screenplay with Pete Richens. It stars Christian Slater as Winston Churchill and Neve Campbell as Elizabeth II. The film is a satire on the Hollywood take on history, such as U-571 (portraying the capture of an Enigma machine as being by the Americans rather than the British) and Pearl Harbor (where American participation in the Battle of Britain was exaggerated).

== Plot ==
Adolf Hitler moves into Buckingham Palace and plans to marry into the Windsors. A U.S. Army officer claims the iconic cigar-smoking PM was an actor named Roy Bubbles; however, he was actually USMC lieutenant Winston Churchill who had stolen an Enigma code machine and then almost single-handedly won a very alternative battle for Britain.

== Cast ==
- Christian Slater as Winston Churchill
- Neve Campbell as Princess Elizabeth
- Miranda Richardson as Eva Braun
- Antony Sher as Adolf Hitler
- Harry Enfield as King George VI
- Jessica Oyelowo as Princess Margaret
- Henry Goodman as Franklin D. Roosevelt
- Jon Culshaw as Tony Blair
- Romany Malco as Denzil Eisenhower
- David Schneider as Joseph Goebbels
- Phil Cornwell as Martin Bormann
- Steve O'Donnell as Hermann Göring
- John Fabian as Victor Sylvester
- James Dreyfus as Mr. Teasy-Weasy
- Rik Mayall as Baxter
- Bob Mortimer as Potter
- Vic Reeves as Bendle
- Sally Phillips as Waitress
- Steve Pemberton as Chester
- Hamish McColl as Captain Davies (present-day)
- Leslie Phillips as Lord W'ruff
- Mackenzie Crook as Jim Charoo
- Brian Perkins as Radio Presenter
- Alistair McGowan as Football Commentators (voice)

== Production ==
It was filmed between 24 March and 12 May 2003. Mainly filmed at the Royal William Yard, Stonehouse, Plymouth.

- Oldway Mansion doubles as Buckingham Palace
- Powderham Castle, Exeter
- The old fish quay at Brixham, Devon doubles as Plymouth Docks

== Reception ==
Philip French writing in The Observer called the film "a hit and miss affair". Peter Bradshaw in The Guardian gave it three stars and said "It's wildly uneven and very broad, but there are some laughs in Peter Richardson's The Comic Strip fantasy of Churchill's real life as a kickass action hero". However, Nev Peirce on the BBC's website panned the film, saying "Sadly, Peter Richardson suffers the fate of many satirists; in trying to mock bad movies, he's simply made a bad movie". The film holds a score of 40% on the review aggregate site Rotten Tomatoes.

The film grossed $288,292 on its opening weekend across 170 screens in the UK. It grossed a total of $478,981 in the United Kingdom.

== Cultural references ==
- The scene between Charoo and the waitress in a station tearoom, and Elizabeth's response on Churchill's arrival there, are parodies of scenes from Brief Encounter, between Stanley Holloway and Joyce Carey, and Trevor Howard and Celia Johnson, respectively
- The taxi driver and the King mistake Adolf Hitler for Charlie Chaplin, who played a spoof of Hitler in the satirical film The Great Dictator
- The "Siegfried Line" rap takes its title and (loosely) some of its lyrics from the British wartime song "We're Going to Hang out the Washing on the Siegfried Line". The introduction to the song is a reference to Top Gun.
- The song "Hitler Has Only Got One Ball" is frequently referenced, including once where it is delivered by Tommy Trinder
- The presence of "Irish Cockneys" is a reference to the steerage passengers in Titanic
- Churchill's final exit in a Spitfire references the portrayal of the American contribution to the Battle of Britain early in the film Pearl Harbor
- Brian Perkins' commentary on Hitler and Elizabeth's wedding is a parody of Richard Dimbleby's hushed radio commentaries of royal events
- Eva Braun is shown listening to the end of an episode of The Archers, even though it did not start until six years after the war ended
- Jim Jim Charoo takes his name from a song Dick van Dyke sings in Mary Poppins (he also lives on "Ye Olde Dick Van Dyke Street")
