= Toby Oliver =

Australian film and television cinematographer

- Born: Australia
- Education: Swinburne University of Technology
- Occupation: Cinematographer
- Years active: 1994–present
- Website: tobyoliver.com

Toby Oliver, ACS is an Australian cinematographer.

Variety named him one of the ten cinematographers to watch for in 2017.

== Filmography ==
=== Feature film ===
Year	Title	Director
1994	Everynight ... Everynight	Alkinos Tsilimidos
1999	Fresh Air	Neil Mansfield
2000	Looking for Alibrandi	Kate Woods
2001	Silent Partner	Alkinos Tsilimidos
2004	Tom White	Alkinos Tsilimidos
2004	Waiting Alone	Dayyan Eng
2006	Last Train to Freo	Jeremy Sims
2006	Em 4 Jay	Alkinos Tsilimidos
2009	The Combination	David Field
2010	Beneath Hill 60	Jeremy Sims
2011	33 Postcards	Pauline Chan
2013	Wolf Creek 2	Greg McLean
2016	The Darkness	Greg McLean
2016	Blood Father	Jean-François Richet
2016	Incarnate	Brad Peyton
2017	Get Out	Jordan Peele
2017	Happy Death Day	Christopher Landon
2018	Insidious: The Last Key	Adam Robitel
2018	Wildling	Fritz Böhm
2018	Breaking In	James McTeigue
2018	The Dirt	Jeff Tremaine
2019	Happy Death Day 2U	Christopher Landon
2020	Fantasy Island	Jeff Wadlow
2021	Barb and Star Go to Vista Del Mar	Josh Greenbaum
2022	Day Shift	J. J. Perry
2022	Seriously Red	Gracie Otto
2023	Choose Love	Stuart McDonald
2025	M3GAN 2.0	Gerard Johnstone
2026	Allen	Daley Pearson; Jeffrey Walker

Documentary film

Year	Title	Director	Notes
2007	Forbidden Lie$	Anna Broinowski	With Kathryn Milliss
2010	Cane Toads: The Conquest	Mark Lewis	With Kathryn Milliss and Paul Nichola
2017	Roller Dreams	Kate Hickey	

=== Television ===
Year	Title	Director	Notes
2001	Love Is a Four-Letter Word		
2002	Short Cuts		
2007	Lockie Leonard		Season 1
2007–08	Stupid, Stupid Man	William Usic	8 episodes
2010	Miracles	Leo Faber; Guy Norris	Episode "Miracle in the Storm"
2011	Spirited		Season 2
2020	Dead to Me	Liza Johnson; Tamra Davis	Season 2
2027	Stuck Up & Stupid	Helena Brooks; Jocelyn Moorhouse	

Miniseries

Year	Title	Director	Notes
2002	Dossa and Joe	Caroline Aherne	
2012	Devil's Dust	Jessica Hobbs	
2015	Blood and Thunder: The Sound of Alberts	Paul Clarke	Documentary series
2025	Apple Cider Vinegar	Jeffrey Walker	

TV movies

Year	Title	Director
2002	BloodSports	Michael James Rowland
2012	Beaconsfield	Glendyn Ivin
2014	The Killing Field	Samantha Lang
2014	Carlotta	Samantha Lang
