= The Last Impresario =

- Official release film poster
- Directed by: Gracie Otto
- Produced by: Nicole O'Donohue
- Starring: Michael White; Gracie Otto; John Cleese; Naomi Watts; Kate Moss; Yoko Ono; John Waters; Rachel Ward; Barry Humphries; Wallace Shawn; Andre Gregory; Jim Sharman
- Cinematography: Gracie Otto
- Edited by: Karen Johnson
- Music by: Michael Yezerski
- Production companies: Wildflower Films; Ralf Films
- Distributed by: Umbrella Entertainment; Dogwoof Pictures
- Release dates: 13 October 2013 (London Film Festival); 26 June 2014 (Australia)
- Running time: 85 minutes
- Country: Australia
- Language: English

The Last Impresario is a 2013 documentary film about prolific British theatre impresario and film producer Michael White. The film was directed by Gracie Otto, and made its world premiere at the BFI London Film Festival in October 2013, where it was positively received by critics.

The film features interviews with White and some of his close friends and colleagues, including John Cleese, Naomi Watts, Kate Moss, Rachel Ward, Yoko Ono, Barry Humphries, Wallace Shawn, Andre Gregory, John Waters, Jim Sharman, Peter Richardson (British Director), Nigel Planer, Nell Campbell, Lorne Michaels, Jeremy Thomas, Jean-Jacques Lebel, Brian Thomson, Anna Wintour, and Lyndall Hobbs.

== Story ==
The film examines White's life and legacy, from his birth in Glasgow in 1936, to his early childhood and education at Lyceum Alpinum Zuoz in Switzerland and then at the Sorbonne in Paris, to his rising success as a young theatre impresario in London's West End, where he staged over 100 productions, including Oh! Calcutta!, The Rocky Horror Show, A Chorus Line, and Annie. White's success as a feature film producer, responsible for Monty Python and the Holy Grail, The Rocky Horror Picture Show, Jabberwocky, and My Dinner With Andre, among many others, is also detailed. The film documents White's recent heart attack, bankruptcy, and the sale of his life's collection of memorabilia in 2011 at a Sotheby's auction. The film explores White's relationships with artists, musicians, actors, filmmakers, comedians and celebrities of the twentieth century, including Kate Moss, John Cleese, Jack Nicholson, John Lennon, Yoko Ono, Mick Jagger, Pina Bausch, Andy Warhol, Naomi Watts, through a combination of interviews, narration, archival footage, home video, location photography, excerpts from his plays and films, letters, and photographs.

== Production ==
Director Gracie Otto began working on the documentary in 2010. She befriended Michael White in Cannes, France, at the 2010 Cannes Film Festival, and became intrigued by his life story. Gracie began conducting and filming self-funded interviews and shoots with friends and colleagues of White throughout the world, and spent considerable time following White around London, documenting his life. In October 2012, a crowd funding campaign was launched online through Indiegogo to finance the film's post-production and completion, successfully raising US$48,341. During production the film was originally titled Chalky: The Michael White Story. The film was completed in 2013 and renamed The Last Impresario ahead of its world premiere in October at the BFI London Film Festival.

== Release ==
The film premiered at the 57th Annual BFI London Film Festival on 13 October 2013. Michael White attended the premiere and after-party, along with many of his friends and colleagues, including Nigel Planer, Rupert and Candida Lycett Green, Lyndall Hobbs, Bill Oddie, Jean Pigozzi, Greta Scacchi, Barnaby Thompson, Joshua White, Liberty White, Miranda Darling, Staffan Ahrenberg, Rupert Everett, Jeremy Irons, Joel and Nash Edgerton, Richard Young, and Peter Eyre. The after-party was held at the exclusive The Arts Club in Mayfair, London.

The Last Impresario has played at other international film festivals, including the 10th Dubai International Film Festival in 2013, and in 2014 at the 10th Glasgow Film Festival, the 10th Biografilm Festival in Bologna, Italy, and the DocWeek Film Festival in Adelaide, Australia, where it was the Opening Night film. The film screened at the 61st Sydney Film Festival in June 2014, where it competed for the Documentary Australia Foundation Award official competition.

The film was released theatrically in Australia on 26 June 2014 by local distributor Umbrella Entertainment, screening in cinemas in Sydney, Melbourne, Brisbane, Adelaide and Canberra. A UK theatrical release was planned for late 2014 by the film's British distributor and international sales agent, Dogwoof Pictures.

== Reception ==
The film received positive reviews from critics. On the review aggregator website Rotten Tomatoes, 94% of 16 critics' reviews are positive, with an average rating of 6.4/10.
