= Pete Richens =

British screenwriter

- Born: 1953; Devon, England
- Died: 2018 (age 65); Devon, England
- Occupation: Screenwriter
- Years active: 1982–2018

Peter Richens was a British screenwriter. Richens is perhaps best known as the writing partner of Peter Richardson, writer/director/star of the long-running TV series The Comic Strip Presents.

== Biography ==
In Richens's own words, Richardson was "the boss" of the script, with Richens acting as a "mechanic" who was "paid to make these ideas work." His talent for shaping a script was honed in the early days of The Comic Strip stage performances, where he would transcribe the best of the performer's improvisations and create a coherent narrative from them. He also acted as associate director on Comic Strip productions, and enjoyed the occasional cameo role, notably as a cheerful depressive in Gregory: Diary of a Nutcase.

== Death ==
Richens died at the age of 65. No cause of death was immediately announced.

== Filmography ==
=== Film ===
- Eat the Rich (1987) as Cafe Owner

=== TV series ===
- The Comic Strip Presents... (6 episodes) (1988–1993)

=== Writer ===
- The Comic Strip Presents... (24 episodes) (1982–2016)
- The Supergrass (1985)
- Eat the Rich (1987)
- The Pope Must Die (1991)
- Jenny Eclair Squats (1997)
- Private Function (1999)
- Churchill: The Hollywood Years (2004)
