= Wild Boys =

- Genre: Period drama
- Starring: Daniel MacPherson; Zoe Ventoura; Michael Dorman; David Field; Nathaniel Dean; Alexander England; Anna Hutchison; Christopher Stollery; Jeremy Sims; Krew Boylan; Colin Friels; Mathew Burn
- Composers: Michael Lira and David McCormack
- Country of origin: Australia
- Original language: English
- No. of seasons: 1
- No. of episodes: 13

Production
- Producers: Julie McGauran; Sarah Smith
- Production company: Southern Star Entertainment

Original release
- Network: Seven Network
- Release: 4 September – 20 November 2011

Dan MacPherson

Wild Boys is an Australian television period drama series that began airing on the Seven Network on 4 September 2011. It is produced by Julie McGauran and Sarah Smith from Southern Star and John Holmes. The series is set in and around the fictional town of Hopetoun and principally filmed in Wilberforce on the Hawkesbury, Nelson, and Glenworth Valley on the New South Wales Central Coast. The series premiered in the UK on TCM UK on 3 March 2013.

The series was not renewed for a second season due to low viewership.

== Plot ==
The pilot episode establishes the character of Jack Keenan and his friend Dan Sinclair, bushrangers in 1860s' colonial New South Wales. Their robberies target those travelling by horse and cart as they usually carry with them a large amount of valuables. One such robbery attempt proves to be unsuccessful and another bushranger, Hogan, (who is usually at heads with the morals of Jack and Dan) assists them but lets his identity slip.

One of the victims of this robbery is the new Police Superintendent of Hopetoun, Francis Fuller and he wants to kill Jack and Dan at any cost. Jack returns to the town and stays at the inn owned and run by Mary Barrett with whom he has a relationship. Mary however is angry at Jack as he hasn't been back for about three months. Fuller searches the town for Jack and Dan and almost catches them at the inn, but does catch and kills Hogan who he recognised from the robbery. Fuller ambushes Jack and Dan on another robbery attempt and they are captured.

On the way to their trial at court Fuller plans to kill Jack, Dan and an innocent farrier Conrad Fischer who is arrested under the pretence that he stole a horse. He wishes to eliminate Conrad as he knows that Emelia Fife, the mayor's daughter has feelings for Conrad and Fuller too likes her. When the three men realise that they are about to be killed, they escape from the cart, hijack the horses and ride off. In order to pay for new guns they decide to rob the Hopetoun police station of the police payroll.

Conrad refuses to help them claiming that he is not a bushranger and will not take part in criminal activities but when he sees that they are in trouble he creates a diversion and saves them. Hence the boys decide to give him a part of their earnings and he decides to go try his luck with the Gold Rush and heads off away from town as it is now unsafe to return. Emelia is informed by Francis that Conrad has been killed and she is distraught and knows that Francis accused him due to his anger that she rejected him. However Conrad later visits her before departure and they both admit their feelings for each other and Conrad tells her that he will return for her and will try and strike it rich at the gold mines.

Dan too decides to take a break for a few days and meet up later with Jack. Jack heads off to another family house who offer him a place to stay and a warm meal however later that night he hears screaming only to see the head of the family killed and as he walks out to take a look he is shot and knocked out by a masked figure.

== Cast ==
- Daniel MacPherson as Jack Keenan
- Zoe Ventoura as Mary Barrett
- Michael Dorman as Dan Sinclair
- David Field as Captain Gunpowder
- Nathaniel Dean as Mick Scanlon
- Alexander England as Conrad Fischer
- Anna Hutchison as Emelia Fife
- Christopher Stollery as James Fife
- Jeremy Sims as Francis Fuller
- Krew Boylan as Ruby Rutherford
- Jeremy Lindsay Taylor as Brady
- Caroline Brazier as Catherine Bell
- Colin Friels aa Mad Dog Morgan
- Mathew Burn as Bill the Barman
- Kai Lewins as Tom Barrett
- Jamie Timony as Clarke Thompson
- Bridie Carter as Victoria
- Aaron Jeffery as Captain Moonlite / Preacher Scott
- Russell Dykstra as Winston (2 episodes)
- Simon Lyndon as Hogan (1 episode)
- Josef Ber as Mr Prescott (1 episode)
- Nicholas Hope as Morris McLardy (1 episode)

== Episodes ==
No.	Title	Directed by	Written by	Original release date	Australia viewers (millions)
1	"Episode 1"	Jeffrey Walker	John Ridley	4 September 2011	1.827
Bushrangers Jack Keenan and Dan Sinclair are on the new Police Superintendent Francis Fuller's hunt list after they unknowingly robbed his cart. Conrad Fischer, a local black-smith, has to flee with them, after Fuller accuses him of stealing a horse, having taken a shine to Conrad's girlfriend.
2	"Episode 2"	Jeffrey Walker	John Ridley	11 September 2011	1.504
Shot and left for dead, Jack Keenan is accused of murders he didn't commit. He tries and finds the real killer, while avoiding getting captured and hanged.
3	"Episode 3"	Ken Cameron	James Walker	18 September 2011	1.366
When Jack, Dan, Charlie and Gunpowder discover that the bank they are trying to rob is empty, they decide to take the bank manager and his wife hostage until the money arrives.
4	"Episode 4"	Arnie Custo	Dave Warner	25 September 2011	1.222
As the Hopetoun Cup is running in town, Jack intends to ride and win the event – of course he also has stolen the favourite, painted it up and entered it as his own.
5	"Episode 5"	Michelle Offen	Ken Cameron	2 October 2011	0.986
6	"Episode 6"	Arnie Custo	John Ridley	9 October 2011	0.946
7	"Episode 7"	Ian Barry	James Walker	16 October 2011	0.89
8	"Episode 8"	Ian Barry	Sarah Smith	23 October 2011	0.922
9	"Episode 9"	Shirley Barrett	Michelle Offen	30 October 2011	0.899
10	"Episode 10"	Shirley Barrett	John Ridley	6 November 2011	0.907
11	"Episode 11"	Mark Joffe	Sam Meikle	13 November 2011	0.896
12	"Episode 12"	Mark Joffe	Dave Warner	20 November 2011	0.86
13	"Episode 13"	Ian Watson	John Ridley	20 November 2011	0.86
