= Lanah P =

English entertainer (born 1959)

- Born: Alan Pillay; 1959 (age 66–67); Grimsby, Lincolnshire, England
- Other names: Alan Pillay, Al-ana Pellay, Lana Pellay, Lanah Pellay, Lanah P
- Occupations: Actor, comedian, singer
- Years active: 1983–present

Lanah P (born 1959) is an LGBT English entertainer.

Previously billed as Alan Pellay, Al Pillay, Al-ana Pellay, and Lana Pellay, Pillay starred in The Comic Strip Presents and as Alex in the 1987 film Eat the Rich.

== Early life ==
Pillay was born near the docks of Grimsby and was the youngest of six children; her mother was a cleaner of Bajan descent; her father, of Indian descent, was an engineer on the fishing trawlers.

== Career ==
=== Working men's clubs ===
Pillay left school at 15 and went to Manchester, where she befriended Northern drag performers Bunny Lewis and Frank "Foo Foo" Lammar. Pillay impersonated Shirley Bassey, Eartha Kitt, Lena Horne, Cleo Laine, and Dorothy Squires in full drag, with no microphone, and was booked into the working men's clubs throughout the North of England, as well as the cabaret club circuit.

=== Disco diva ===
During a lull in Pillay's drag career, while managing the Black Market Café in Levenshulme and renting a room from Coronation Street actor Alan Rothwell, Pillay was introduced to Kay Carroll and Mark E Smith of The Fall. Pillay formed her own band, the I Scream Pleasures, who subsequently appeared as guest support at Fall gigs.

Pillay also recorded with Adrian Sherwood and his dub label, On-U Sound, recording the track "Parasitic Machine" for an early compilation. The sound engineer was Mark Lusardi, who had previously worked with Creation Rebel.

Pillay metamorphosed into a disco diva as the hormone-popping transsexual Lana Pellay, dressed in costumes by her close friend Leigh Bowery, enjoying a top 40 single in Australia and New Zealand with "Pistol in My Pocket". She also accompanied Gary Clail on his 1991 hit "Human Nature", singing the couplet "Let the carnival begin... Every pleasure, every sin!"

=== TV and film career ===
While living in Notting Hill, west London, Pillay met Keith Allen, who invited Pillay to appear on the first programme aimed at a youth audience on the recently launched Channel 4 network. There, Pillay met her champion, Peter Richardson. The latter was an actor, comedian, writer and director for The Comic Strip Presents who wrote parts for her in the episodes "Susie", "Gino", "The Bullshitters" and the feature-length film The Supergrass. Pillay played Ray in "Susie" (episode 8), Themself (as Alan Pellay) in "Gino: Full Story and Pics" (episode 10), Themself (as Alana Pellay) in "The Bullshitters" (episode 13), Mary (as Lana Pellay) in the film The Supergrass and Women's Clothing Shop Employee in "Consuela (Or 'The New Mrs Saunders')" (episode 14).

Richardson also wrote the lead part for Pillay in the 1987 feature film Eat the Rich. Following The Comic Strip, Pillay became a film critic on the ITV late night chat show Funky Bunker, alongside Craig Charles.

=== Theatre and cabaret ===
As Al Pillay, she performed in a one-person play, Glitter & Twisted, based on her life and written by Tim Fountain, which had its premiere at the Beckett Theater on 42nd Street as part of the first Manhattan Musical Theatre Festival. She also appeared in her own cabaret show, A Life in Song, at Pizza on the Park and the Café De Paris in London. Her cabaret performance has been released as a double CD. In 2012, she played the title role of the Welsh singer Dorothy Squires on stage in Mrs Roger Moore.

== Discography ==
=== Singles ===
- "Pistol in My Pocket" (1986) – UK No. 96, AUS No. 17, NZ No. 40
- "I Can Make a Man Out of You" (1986)
- "Pistol In My Pocket (Vince Clarke Erasure Mix)" (2018)
- "Winter of Love" (2019)
- "Human Race" (2020)
- "Ghosts of Christmas Past" (2020)
