= The Professionals (TV series) =

British television crime drama series (1977–1983)

- Title card used from Series 2 onwards, and repeat transmissions of Series 1
- Genre: Crime thriller Action; Adventure
- Created by: Brian Clemens
- Starring: Gordon Jackson; Martin Shaw; Lewis Collins
- Theme music composer: Laurie Johnson
- Country of origin: United Kingdom
- Original language: English
- No. of series: 5
- No. of episodes: 57 (list of episodes)

Production
- Executive producers: Albert Fennell; Brian Clemens
- Producer: Sidney Hayers
- Running time: 50 minutes
- Production company: Avengers Mark1 Productions for LWT

Original release
- Network: ITV
- Release: 30 December 1977 – 6 February 1983

The Professionals is a British crime-action television drama series produced by Avengers Mark1 Productions for London Weekend Television (LWT) that aired on the ITV network from 30 December 1977 to 6 February 1983. In all, 57 episodes were produced, filmed between 1977 and 1981. It starred Martin Shaw, Lewis Collins and Gordon Jackson as agents of the fictional "CI5" (Criminal Intelligence 5, alluding to the real-life MI5 and CID).

The Professionals was created by Brian Clemens, who had been one of the driving forces behind The Avengers. The show was originally to have been called The A-Squad. Clemens and Albert Fennell were executive producers, with business partner Laurie Johnson providing the theme music. Sidney Hayers produced the first series in 1977, and Raymond Menmuir the remainder.

== Overview ==
Criminal Intelligence 5 (CI5) is a British law enforcement department, instructed by the Home Secretary to use any means to deal with crimes of a serious nature that go beyond the capacity of the police, but which are not tasks for the Security Service or the military.

The choice of CI5's name is inspired by CID and MI5. The premise allowed the programme makers to involve a wide variety of villains, including terrorists, hitmen, hate groups and espionage suspects, with plots sometimes relating to the Cold War. Led by George Cowley (Gordon Jackson), CI5 is known for using unconventional and sometimes illegal methods to beat criminals, or as Cowley put it, "Fight fire with fire!" The use of a fictitious force in this context was somewhat less controversial than the portrayal of the real Flying Squad in The Sweeney.

Cowley's two best agents are Ray Doyle (Martin Shaw) and William Bodie (Lewis Collins). Doyle is an ex–detective constable who has worked the seedier parts of London, while Bodie is an ex-paratrooper, mercenary and SAS sergeant. Of the two, Doyle is the softer, compassionate and more thoughtful character, while Bodie is ruthless and more willing to take on criminals on their own terms. That said, Doyle is more hot-headed and tends to rush in, while Bodie waits for the shooting to start.

While polar opposites, Bodie and Doyle have an enduring friendship, and are very close. Although their loyalty to Cowley is beyond question, they have no qualms about disobeying orders if it means getting the right result, either for the case or themselves.

Initially, Anthony Andrews was contracted to play Bodie, but he and Shaw did not have the chemistry that Clemens was looking for. As Shaw was deemed to have more "screen presence", Andrews was dropped, Clemens hiring Collins in his place.

Shaw and Collins had played villains in a 1977 episode of The New Avengers ("Obsession") together, with Shaw stating in 2025 that he and Collins had not got on with each other, accusing the latter of being arrogant on the set. When Collins was brought into the production, Shaw tried to block Collins being cast as Bodie after their previous experience of working together, making a friendly approach on the first day of filming to Collins which was rejected out of hand, leading to a difficult relationship off-screen for the remainder of the series' production, managing to keep up the on-screen chemistry and abrasiveness of Bodie and Doyle's relationship.The two actors met again a decade after the series finished, settling their differences and becoming friends until Collins' death in 2013.

The Collins character in "Obsession" signed off by saying "Maybe we should work together again. We're a good team." The first Professionals episode was produced later the same year.

Clemens intended to write two or three establishing episodes and then hand over to other writers, but their scripts were uneven and lacked the energy and pace needed. Clemens re-wrote nearly ten scripts for the first series episodes and took a direct hands-on approach to the filming. In later series, with the format established and the writers and directors familiar with the show, he took a more leisurely approach behind the scenes.

The early years of the show featured varied plots, good scripts and ongoing character development of Bodie and Doyle and to a lesser extent Cowley, but later series featured increasingly overused ideas and script devices, and both Collins and Shaw stated they felt the show was becoming stale. Although the final series was broadcast from November 1982 until February 1983, no episodes were filmed after May 1981.

== Characters ==
=== Cowley ===
Major George Cowley (Gordon Jackson) (born c. 1916) – Nicknamed "Morris" after the car of the same name. His operatives sometimes call him "The Cow", though not to his face. Founder and head of CI5, making him Bodie and Doyle's boss. As a young man, he was a socialist volunteer in the Spanish Civil War for the POUM on the Republican side, where he was shot in the leg in 1937; this left him with a painful limp. Cowley served as an officer in the British Army, where he attained the rank of major. He then worked in the secret services including MI5, before being seconded to CI5 to form and manage the team. He is a confident and very experienced man, able to defend himself against physical and high-level political attacks. With many contacts and friends in high places, he is not afraid to clash with leaders of other services like Special Branch and MI5, or to speak his mind, being insolent even towards superiors, one of whom looked upon Cowley as "Not a Very Civil Civil Servant". Cowley's favourite drink is single malt Scotch whisky.

=== Doyle ===
Raymond Doyle (Martin Shaw) (born c. 1949), a former police detective constable who originated in Derby but later lived in an unspecified "city" with parallels to Birmingham (Shaw's hometown). He was working the seedier parts of east London when recruited into CI5. He took art classes, and appears to be musically inclined as well. An expert shot with a pistol, he also ran a karate class for the children on his beat. He was recruited by Cowley, and was made Bodie's partner shortly afterwards. Doyle is extremely intelligent and thoughtful but is also quick to anger, and his tendency to rush in often leaves Bodie having to race to the rescue. He is also more inclined to seek long-lasting relationships with women, and in one episode nearly married. Like Bodie he enjoyed football, but was a good cook and enjoyed a healthier lifestyle. Doyle's bubble perm hairstyle and 1970s dress sense were chosen by Martin Shaw and his wife. In the episode "Hunter/Hunted", he is shown to live on Cliff Road in Camden.

=== Bodie ===
William Andrew Philip Bodie (Lewis Collins) (born c. 1950) was a former paratrooper and Special Air Service (SAS) soldier. After leaving school aged 14, he joined the Merchant Navy and eventually ended up in Africa as a mercenary fighting bush wars. Noticed by Cowley during his SAS career, he was asked to join CI5 in 1975. Keen on parties, and a ladies' man, Bodie had a witty comment ready for almost every occasion. He was more immediately approachable than Doyle, and was generally relaxed and confident, although tending to hide his intelligence behind his hardman image. Specialising in weaponry, martial arts and advanced driving, Bodie was the muscle of the three leads. He enjoyed football, cricket, drinking and English literature.

== Cars ==
The best-known car used by CI5 was the Ford Capri 3.0 S (primarily the Mark III model and one Mk II). Two were used: Bodie drove a silver version (1978–1981 episodes), Doyle a gold (1980–81 episodes), in the first season a silver Mk II with a black vinyl roof and a Series X bodykit was also briefly used, the first two cars mentioned still exist and were saved from being scrapped, and were restored in the 1990s, but the existence of the silver Mk II driven by Bodie is still uncertain and debated. Cowley used a latest model Ford Granada (1978–1981 Ghia model) while other Ford models such as a Ford Escort RS2000 (1978–79 episodes, driven by Doyle) and the Ford Cortina, particularly the Mark V (TF) model, were occasionally seen. However, in the first (1977) series, the cars used were mainly those of British Leyland, including a Rover SD1, a Rover P6, a Princess, a Triumph 2000, a Triumph Dolomite Sprint and a Triumph TR7. The SD1, a turmeric yellow 3500, bore the registration MOO 229R; in The New Avengers John Steed drove an identical-looking car with the number MOC 229P. The producers of The Professionals DVDs have speculated that these may in fact have been one and the same car.

However, reliability problems with the cars and British Leyland requiring them back to give to the motoring press was causing disruption to filming. Midway through the first series, the supplier was then switched to Ford after they offered to provide vehicles for the production crew as well as for on-screen use. The first Ford to be prominent was a black 1600 Capri used by another CI5 agent, Tommy MacKay.

Many of the episodes featured a car chase, a role for which the Capri, at least in terms of its market positioning, was particularly well-suited.

The grey Rolls-Royce Silver Shadow chassis no. SRH 2971, known as the most filmed individual Rolls-Royce ever in history, was part of the cars supplied by Kingsbury Motors Ltd. This particular car was seen in at least five episodes.

== Firearms ==
It's not a toy, Bodie.

— George Cowley, "Hunter/Hunted"

Bodie and Doyle originally carried 9 mm L9A1 Browning pistols as their standard service sidearms for the first two series. They were issued .44 Magnum Smith & Wesson Model 29 revolvers when on bodyguard duties (as seen in the episode "Mixed Doubles"). In later series Bodie carried a .357 Magnum Smith & Wesson Model 19 snub-nose revolver and Doyle often carried a 9 mm Walther P38 as their personal sidearms. George Cowley carried a .38 calibre Smith & Wesson Model 36 snub nose revolver.

The "A180 Laser Lock" sniper rifle (from Series 2, Episode 1; "Hunter/Hunted") was an AR-10 with a sight bracket on the carrying handle and a large laser projector under the barrel. A converted Thompson M1928 50-round drum mounted on the top of the barrel, supposedly the ammo supply, hid the battery pack.

== Opening titles ==
Series 1 opening titles.

The opening credits for the first series (broadcast 1977–78) starts with a Rolls-Royce speeding onto and through an industrial estate before skidding to a stop. As the Rolls-Royce enters and goes through the industrial estate, the title "The Professionals" appears on screen. Cowley, Bodie and Doyle get out of the vehicle and Bodie and Doyle then go through an assault course while being timed on a stopwatch by Cowley. It ends with them going through set windows and a close up of the stopwatch being stopped and Cowley standing by the car motioning them to get in. Just as the theme tune ends, they get in the car and it drives off. The first two broadcast episodes of the series – "Private Madness, Public Danger" and "The Female Factor" – feature a voiceover by Cowley over the top of the title sequence but this was removed from the third episode ("Old Dog with New Tricks") onwards. When the first series has been repeated, all episodes (bar "When the Heat Cools Off" and the usually unscreened "Klansmen") are shown using the more familiar title sequence employed for the second series onwards. This means that the Cowley voiceover is never married to the correct visuals on the repeat broadcasts of the episodes featuring it.

For the remaining series the opening titles started with a car driving through a tinted window before cutting to various shots of the main characters running and Cowley getting into a car before putting down a car phone in the back seat. We then see the green title card with CI5 written in big, black, stencil-style letters, "The Professionals" written in white over it and three yellow squares on the right-hand side, each containing a silhouette of one of the three principal actors. It then zooms in on the top square and we see various shots of Gordon Jackson, followed by a pan to a close-up shot of a computer terminal keyboard, and various shots of Martin Shaw running through an oil refinery and wielding a kendo stick. It then cuts to shots of Lewis Collins walking down a street, weightlifting, and using a punching bag, before cutting to a car driving through a dimly lit tunnel; Gordon Jackson walking out of a government building (10 Trinity Square, City of London); and the three of them walking down the street away from that building and towards the camera.

== Controversy ==
Although depictions of actual bloodshed were scarce, the series was often criticised for its level of violence, with shootings, martial arts and asphyxiation a common means of assassination.

To help maximise the on-screen action, Martin Shaw and Lewis Collins were taught stunt driving skills and encouraged to propel their respective cars through streets as rapidly as possible, although LWT insisted that the stars had to be chauffeured when travelling to filming sets. In his last interview about the series, Brian Clemens laughed off the actors' claims about "doing their own stunts" in the cars. He said that they had been taught "little more" than how to execute a handbrake turn. The British stuntman and stunt co-ordinator Peter Brayham did most of the precision driving, and with his dark curly hair, often stood in for Martin Shaw during the scenes where Doyle was driving. Shaw in particular, was known within the production team to be fairly inept with the cars. He was far too heavy on the brakes and throttle, regularly kerbed the cars, and often over-steered himself into trouble. This can be seen in many episodes. In the episode "Weekend in the Country", Gordon Jackson can be seen pulling away from a stationary position at the roadside, in a Chrysler Alpine. He can be seen pulling out without fully checking the traffic flow, directly in front of an approaching Volkswagen Beetle.

The first series episode "Klansmen" was withdrawn in the UK, ostensibly due to its race-related subject matter. The episode has never been screened on terrestrial television in the UK, although it did screen uncut on the cable television channel Super-channel in 1987, and has been screened in other countries including South Africa, New Zealand, Australia, Argentina and the Philippines. In 2020 the episode was available to stream on Amazon Prime. LWT refused to explain its view that while the episode remained unsuitable for British television viewers, it continued to be licensed to broadcasters in other countries.

The show was also criticised for political incorrectness. Mary Whitehouse, President of the National Viewers' and Listeners' Association, called the show, "violent, uncouth and unsavoury". In the closing credits of the episode "Stake Out" two supporting actors are identified as "Attractive Blonde" and "Handsome Negro". At the time such dialogue or descriptions were not seen as being disparaging. However, in the late 1980s and early 1990s the series was criticised by feminist groups. Yet, with the exception of "Klansmen", for which racist terms were a necessary part of the story, use of such terms in The Professionals was scarce in comparison to, for example, the 1970s police television programme The Sweeney.

Martin Shaw was publicly critical of the series during its production, feeling that he was playing a one-dimensional character in a one-dimensional show. Several years after the series ended London Weekend Television was contractually obliged to re-negotiate repeat fees with the lead actors. Unwilling to accede to Shaw's demands, plans for further repeat screenings on the ITV network had to be withdrawn, leading to Lewis Collins expressing his frustration toward Shaw in an interview for the British press. However, Shaw eventually agreed to UK satellite screenings; although, according to a Radio Times interview, he did so only after being discreetly made aware that Gordon Jackson's widow, actress Rona Anderson (who guested in "Cry Wolf"), was suffering financial difficulties after her husband's death and needed the repeat fees.

Episodes were shown on terrestrial TV as part of special occasions, such as a general overview of ITV's history; LWT, which produced the series, repeated a selection of episodes from the series in the early 1990s, although was the only region to do so. It was not until 2008 that the series gained a re-run on ITV4. The Professionals has also been regularly shown on cable TV.

The entire series was regularly screened on the now-defunct Granada Plus channel from 1997, where it was consistently the channel's highest-rated show, initially achieving close to one million viewers. The episodes shown were heavily edited to make them suitable for daytime viewing and it is these same prints that are being used for transmission on ITV4. Neither station screened the "Klansmen" episode, stating that London Weekend Television continued to forbid its transmission.

In 1987, ITV was re-running some episodes. After the Hungerford shooting incident the particular episode that was to be aired, "Lawson's Last Stand", had a theme that was deemed insensitive and was replaced by the less violent "The Untouchables".

=== Remake ===
CI5: The New Professionals was a crime drama that aired on the Sky 1 satellite channel from 19 September to 19 December 1999. An updating of the original show, the series is set in a fictional government agency CI5 (Civilian Intelligence department 5 as opposed to MI5, Military Intelligence).

The original group of three men (Doyle, Bodie and their boss Cowley) were replaced by a new group of three men and a woman:

- Harry Malone (played by Edward Woodward)
- Sam Curtis (played by Colin Wells)
- Chris Keel (Kal Weber)
- Tina Backus (Lexa Doig)

The team were responsible to a minister, played by Charlotte Cornwell.

In a similar manner to the original series the show included action sequences. However, the show was not a ratings success and only ran for one series.

== In popular culture ==
In the BBC TV comedy series The Two Ronnies, Ronnie Corbett played a bungling version of Martin Shaw's Doyle in a sketch called Tinker Tailor Smiley Doyle (Series 11; broadcast February 1985 – March 1985). This was a joint send-up of The Professionals and the Tinker Tailor Soldier Spy TV drama, with Ronnie Barker playing George Smiley along the lines of Alec Guinness' portrayal in Tinker, Tailor, Soldier, Spy. Corbett's Doyle provides the brawn to the brains of Barker's Smiley and actually comes out the worse. The sketch guest-starred Frank Williams from Dad's Army.

In 1984 some of the team behind The Comic Strip TV series produced a spoof entitled The Bullshitters, featuring two characters called Bonehead and Foyle in an episode called "Roll Out the Gun Barrel".

Bonehead and Foyle returned to TV screens in 1993 in The Comic Strip one-off Detectives on the Edge of a Nervous Breakdown alongside 'Shouting George from The Weeny' (Jack Regan from The Sweeney), 'Spanker' (Spender) and 'Jason Bentley' (Department S's Jason King).

Peter Jackson's 1987 film, Bad Taste, featured Astro Investigation and Defence Service employees "the boys", a Doyle and Bodie parody complete with Ford Capri.

In 1996 Nissan cars ran a comedy spoof TV advertisement based on the series, featuring Phil Cornwell playing Doyle and Ray Trickett playing Bodie, testing out its new release, the Nissan Almera.

In Series 1, Episode 2 of Harry Hill's TV Burp, Harry in a sketch parodying The Bill is dressed as a Police Officer and Superintendent Okaro and DC Carver find something suspicious about him and search him and find a CI5 ID card.

The programme and its characters were repeatedly referenced in the third series of Ashes to Ashes, which took place in 1983. DCI Gene Hunt tells DI Alex Drake, "We're a team: Bodie and Doyle. I'm the one in the SAS; you can be the one with the girl's hair." DC Chris Skelton, with sunglasses and a sawn-off shotgun in front of PC Sharon Granger, similarly likens himself to Lewis Collins; Granger ultimately tells Skelton she loves him, not Lewis Collins.

== Other countries ==
=== Germany ===
Since it was first broadcast in West Germany in 1981, the show (Die Profis) has become a cult there. During its broadcast run, the public television service ZDF, due to concerns over politics and violence, did not air all episodes of the programme, so The Professionals became one of the first TV shows ever to be released on VHS in Germany in the 1980s. However, only the unaired episodes were released on tape. In all, fourteen episodes were withdrawn from broadcast.

=== Czechoslovakia ===
The Professionals was one of a few series from the West broadcast in communist Czechoslovakia in the 1980s. It gained a cult following there very quickly. Originally, only a selection of 21 of the 57 episodes was bought, including Klansmen. The first dubbed episode "When the Heat Cools Off" was spoken by Petr Oliva (Bodie), Martin Štěpánek (Doyle) and Jiří Adamíra (Cowley). Štěpánek soon emigrated so the remainder were dubbed by Alois Švehlík.

The whole series was broadcast after 1994 on TV Nova. Petr Oliva continued to dub Bodie but Doyle was dubbed by Karel Heřmánek and Cowley by Otakar Brousek Sr., since Adamíra had died.

=== Spain ===
In Spain, the series The Professionals was broadcast for La 2 of Televisión Española from March 1978.

== Merchandise ==
=== Novels ===
From 1978 to 1982 Sphere Books released fifteen paperback novels to accompany the series. These adapted 38 of the show's 57 episodes. Seven were also published in hardcover editions: Nos. 1, 2, 5, 6 and 15 by Severn House and 3 and 4 by Arthur Barker.

| Title | Publish Date | Author^{‡} | Notes |
|---|---|---|---|
| The Professionals – Where the Jungle Ends | 1978 | Ken Blake | Hardcover Paperback. This is a novelisation of the Series 1 episodes Old Dog with New Tricks, Long Shot, Where the Jungle Ends and Killer with a Long Arm. |
| The Professionals 2 – Long Shot | 1978 | Ken Blake | Hardcover and Paperback. This is a novelisation of the Series 1 episodes Heroes, Private Madness Public Danger, The Female Factor and Everest Was Also Conquered. |
| The Professionals 3 – Stake Out | 1978 | Ken Blake | Hardcover and Paperback. This is a novelisation of the Series 1 episodes Stake Out, When The Heat Cools Off and Close Quarters. |
| The Professionals 4 – Hunter Hunted | 1978 | Ken Blake | Hardcover and Paperback. This is a novelisation of the Series 2 episodes First Night, Hunter/Hunted and The Rack. |
| The Professionals 5 – Blind Run | 1979 | Ken Blake | Hardcover and Paperback. This is a novelisation of the Series 2 episodes Blind Run, Man Without A Past and In the Public Interest. |
| The Professionals 6 – Fall Girl | 1979 | Ken Blake | Hardcover and Paperback. This is a novelisation of the Series 2 episodes Fall Girl, Not a Very Civil Servant and A Stirring of Dust. |
| The Professionals 7 – Hiding to nothing | 1980 | Ken Blake | Paperback. This is a novelisation of the Series 3 episodes Stopover, Runner and A Hiding to Nothing. |
| The Professionals 8 – Dead Reckoning | 1980 | Ken Blake | Paperback. This is a novelisation of the Series 3 episodes Dead Reckoning, Mixed Doubles and Need to Know. |
| The Professionals 9 – No Stone | 1981 | Ken Blake | Paperback. This is a novelisation of the Series 5 episodes A Man Called Quinn and No Stone. |
| The Professionals 10 – Cry Wolf | 1981 | Ken Blake† | Paperback. This is a novelisation of the Series 5 episodes Lawson's Last Stand and Cry Wolf. |
| The Professionals 11 – Spy Probe | 1981 | Ken Blake | Paperback. This is a novelisation of the Series 5 episode Spy Probe and The Madness of Mickey Hamilton from the show's second production block. |
| The Professionals 12 – Fox Hole | 1982 | Ken Blake | Paperback. This is a novelisation of the Series 5 episodes Foxhole on the Roof and The Oujika Situation. |
| The Professionals 13 – The Untouchables | 1982 | Ken Blake† | Paperback. This is a novelisation of a single Series 5 episode, The Untouchables. |
| The Professionals 14 – Operation Susie | 1982 | Ken Blake† | Paperback. This is a novelisation of a single Series 5 episode, Operation Suzie. |
| The Professionals 15 – You'll Be All Right | 1982 | Ken Blake† | Hardcover and Paperback. This is a novelisation of the Series 4 episodes You'll Be Alright and Discovered in a Graveyard. |

‡ All the paperback novelisations published by Sphere Books were credited to the pen name "Ken Blake". The majority were actually adapted from the original episode shooting scripts by science fiction author Kenneth Bulmer, although the volumes marked † where adapted by fantasy author Robert Holdstock. Five of the seven hardcover editions were credited to Kenneth Bulmer. This included, presumably erroneously, the 15th novel. The two Arthur Barker hardbacks were credited to Ken Blake.

=== Annuals ===
From 1979 to 1985 Grandreams Ltd published seven annuals to accompany the series.

| Title | Publish Date | Notes |
|---|---|---|
| The Professionals – Annual | 1979 | Hardcover |
| The Professionals – Annual | 1980 | Hardcover |
| The Professionals – Annual | 1981 | Hardcover |
| The Professionals – Annual | 1982 | Hardcover |
| The Professionals – Annual | 1983 | Hardcover |
| The Professionals – Annual | 1984 | Hardcover |
| The Professionals – Annual | 1985 | Hardcover |

=== Home media releases ===
==== United Kingdom ====
Original footage - left; re-mastered footage by the Network imprint – right.

In the late 1990s, the complete run of 57 episodes were given a UK VHS videocassette release by Contender Entertainment Group. An earlier release had seen 31 episodes issued before the distributor went out of business.

In 2002, Contender reissued the complete run on DVD (for the UK only). Although labelled as having been "digitally remastered", these releases have attracted some criticism, mainly due to the relatively poor picture quality (colour, contrast and levels of dirt and scratches). In part, this was due to problems with the age and condition of the prints used, and the loss of (or lack of access to) the original source footage which would normally be used as the basis of a remaster. These DVDs appear to have been a straight digital conversion of the late 1980s video masters of the "dirty" telecine versions of the episodes, that ITV4 was later editing down and still showing in the 2020s, rather than the later Network restoration versions.

In late 2005, Contender replaced the original DVD releases with a new set which saw some minor improvements in the picture quality.

On 2 September 2013, the Network imprint announced that it had acquired the scripts, production files, original camera negatives and stills from the show. The digitally remastered version of The Professionals was released on DVD and Blu-ray. The restoration process is described in a blog post. Series 1 episodes have had the original opening and closing sequences restored.

- Series 1–3 March 2014., 13 episodes
- Series 2–29 September 2014, 13 episodes
- Series 3–30 March 2015, 13 episodes
- Series 4–2 May 2016, 18 episodes.

==== Australia ====
The Professionals is available in Australia (Region 4 DVD) in four boxed sets ('dossiers') containing the complete series. These are distributed by Umbrella Entertainment and are available via online DVD shops such as EzyDVD JB Hifi Online and MoviesPlus. The four dossiers feature the same episodes per box set as the UK Contender release with a couple of changes in running order in dossiers 2 and 4.

=== Official episode guide ===
In 2009, author Bob Rocca published a book entitled The Professionals, a chronological account of every episode including cast lists and production credits. The book is also a comprehensive guide to merchandised products, from toys to magazines and includes over 200 black and white photographs as well as extensive interviews with actors, producers, writers, directors and other production team members, discussing their work on the series. This publication was also foreworded and given official endorsement by series creator Brian Clemens.
