= Save Your Legs! =

- Film poster
- Directed by: Boyd Hicklin
- Written by: Brendan Cowell
- Produced by: Nick Batzias; Robyn Kershaw
- Starring: Stephen Curry; Damon Gameau; Brendan Cowell
- Cinematography: Mark Wareham
- Edited by: Leanne Cole
- Music by: Cornek Wilczek
- Production companies: India Take One Productions; Nick Batzias Productions; Robyn Kershaw Productions
- Distributed by: Madman Entertainment
- Release dates: 19 August 2012 (Melbourne International Film Festival); 28 February 2013 (Australia)
- Running time: 92 minutes
- Countries: Australia; India
- Language: English

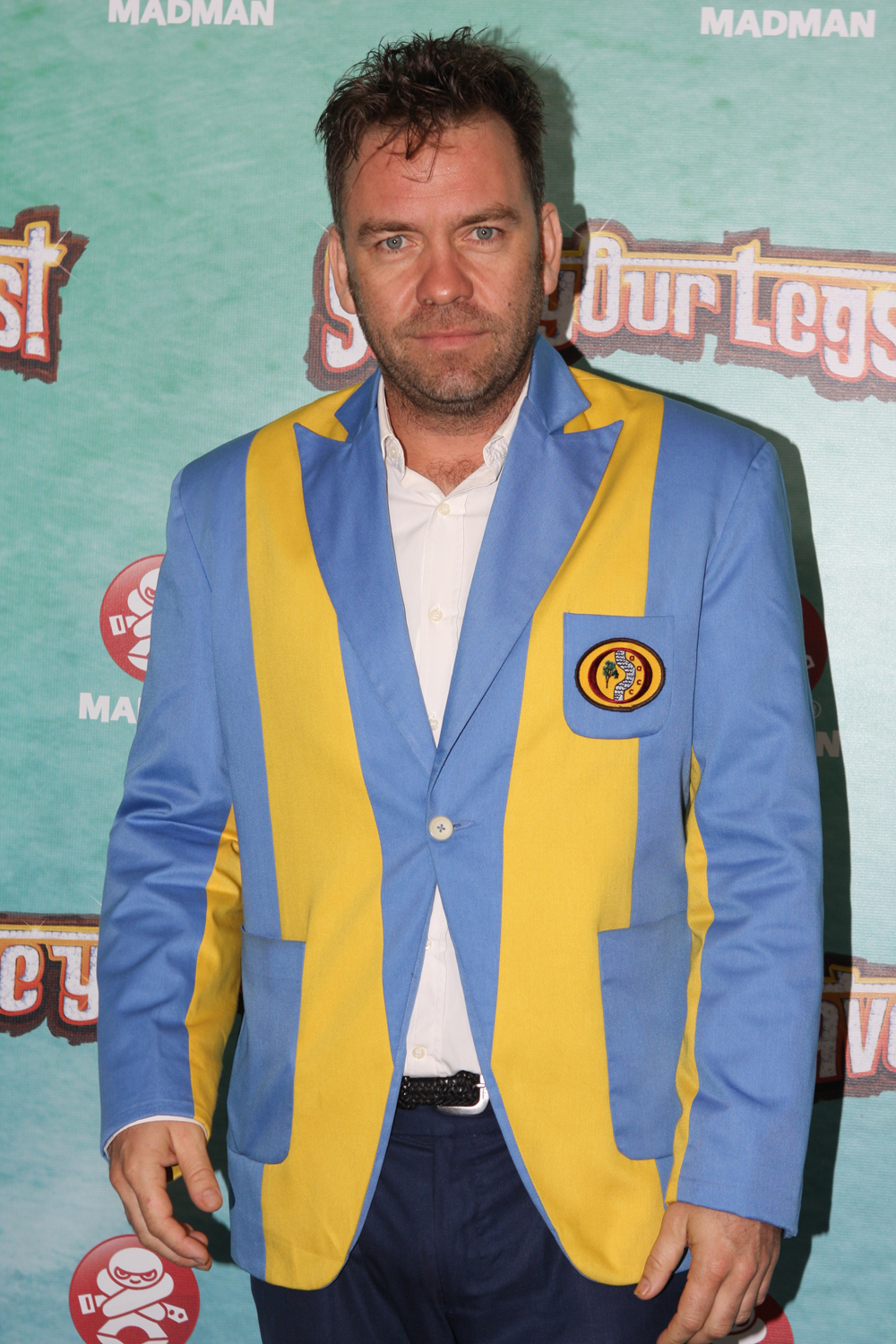
Brendan Cowell, 10 February 2013

Save Your Legs! is a 2012 Australian comedy film directed by Boyd Hicklin and starring Stephen Curry, Damon Gameau and Brendan Cowell. The film is inspired by a 2005 documentary of the same name. It follows the story of Edward "Teddy" Brown and his two mates of a Melbourne cricket team, who travel to India for a tour. The film premiered at the Melbourne International Film Festival on 19 August 2012. In Great Britain, the movie is called Knocked For Six.

== Plot ==
Edward 'Teddy' Brown lives for his suburban cricket club and his two best friends, Rick and Stavros. But when he realises that his beloved teammates are moving on and growing up, he's forced to take matters into his own hands and remind them of just how good cricket can be.

Rallying a boyhood dream and his own teenage obsession, 35-year-old Teddy leads his very ordinary cricket team into the extraordinary heart of India, on an audacious three match tour and a mission to meet cricketing legend, Sachin Tendulkar. While Ted's best-laid plans are brought undone by the chaos of India, stumps fly, friendships fray and a life-changing comic adventure unfolds.

The dream tour becomes a nightmare and the men are forced to face the realities of their friendship, confront their fears and Ted has to learn to move with the changing times.

== Cast ==
- Stephen Curry as Edward 'Teddy' Brown
- Damon Gameau as Stavros
- Brendan Cowell as Rick
- Darren Gilshenan as Colin
- Brenton Thwaites as Mark
- David Lyons as Prince
- Pallavi Sharda as Anjali
- Darshan Jariwala as Sanjeet Thambuswanny
- Sid Makkar as Tusshar Rai
- Grant Piro
- Eddie Baroo as Shadow

== Production ==
In November 2011, the Victorian government supported the film as a way to promote trade between India and Australia. Filming began on 12 December, with extensive shoots in India in early 2012.

== Critical reception ==
Ed Gibbs of The Sydney Morning Herald gave it 4 out of 5 and stated that "this feel-good Australian comedy knocks it into the stands - even for viewers with no interest in cricket".

== Box office ==
Save Your Legs! opened across 176 screens for distributor Madman, taking $165,000, for a screen average of just $936 per screen.

The film was a UK theatrical and DVD release in June 2014 under the revised title of Knocked For Six.

== See also ==
- Cinema of Australia
