= Seriously Red =

2022 film by Gracie Otto

- Theatrical release poster
- Directed by: Gracie Otto
- Written by: Krew Boylan
- Produced by: Jessica Carrera; Sonia Borella; Timothy White; Robyn Kershaw
- Starring: Krew Boylan; Daniel Webber; Celeste Barber; Thomas Campbell; Todd Lasance; Jean Kittson; Bobby Cannavale; Rose Byrne
- Cinematography: Toby Oliver
- Edited by: Deborah Peart; Kate Hickey
- Music by: Cezary Skubiszewski
- Production companies: Dollhouse Pictures; Robyn Kershaw Productions; Invisible Wall Productions; Filmology; Spectrum Films; Arclight Films
- Distributed by: Roadshow Films
- Release dates: 13 March 2022 (SXSW); 24 November 2022 (Australia)
- Running time: 94 minutes
- Country: Australia
- Language: English
- Box office: $579,756

Seriously Red is a 2022 Australian romantic comedy film directed by Gracie Otto, starring Krew Boylan, Daniel Webber, Celeste Barber, Thomas Campbell, Todd Lasance, Jean Kittson, Bobby Cannavale, and Rose Byrne.

== Synopsis ==
After being fired from her job, a former real estate agent tries her hand at being a Dolly Parton impersonator.

== Cast ==
- Krew Boylan as Red
  - India Donohoe as young Red
- Daniel Webber as Kenny
- Rose Byrne as EP
- Bobby Cannavale as Wilson
- Thomas Campbell as Francis
- Celeste Barber as Teeth
- Todd Lasance as Forbes
- Jean Kittson as Viv
- Wayne Blair as Lionel
- Sarah Su as Veronica
- Tony Barry as Gramps
- Dustin Clare as George Michael
- Blair McDonough as Tom
- Dannii Minogue as herself
- Jonathan Walsh as Taylor Swift
- Sophia Forrest as Betty
- Martini McFly as Miss Ton Vee
- Venus Amore as Madonna
- Nell Campbell as Doc Nell
- John Blunt as Freddie Mercury
- Gregory Andrew as Elton John

== Production ==
Seriously Red was written by Krew Boylan and directed by Gracie Otto. It was produced by Robyn Kershaw, Jessica Carrera, Sonia Borella, and Tim White. Toby Oliver was the cinematographer.

Deborah Peart and Kate Hickey edited the film, and Cezary Skubiszewski composed the score.

== Release ==
The film premiered at 2022 South by Southwest Film Festival on 13 March.

It was released theatrically in Australia on 24 November 2022 by Roadshow Films. In July 2022, Gravitas Ventures and Lionsgate acquired North American rights to the film, with a planned release on February 10, 2023.

== Reception ==
On the review aggregator website Rotten Tomatoes, the film holds an approval rating of 47% based on 38 reviews, with an average rating of 5.3/10. The website's consensus reads, "Manipulative and content to fall back on charmless camp for most of its runtime, Seriously Red is a serious letdown."

Dan Callahan of TheWrap praised the script and Boylan's performance. Damon Wise of Deadline Hollywood called the film "raucous but hugely enjoyable". Mae Abdulbaki of Screen Rant rated the film two out of five stars and criticised the writing while calling the performances "fantastic and engaging".
