= Snub TV =

British television series

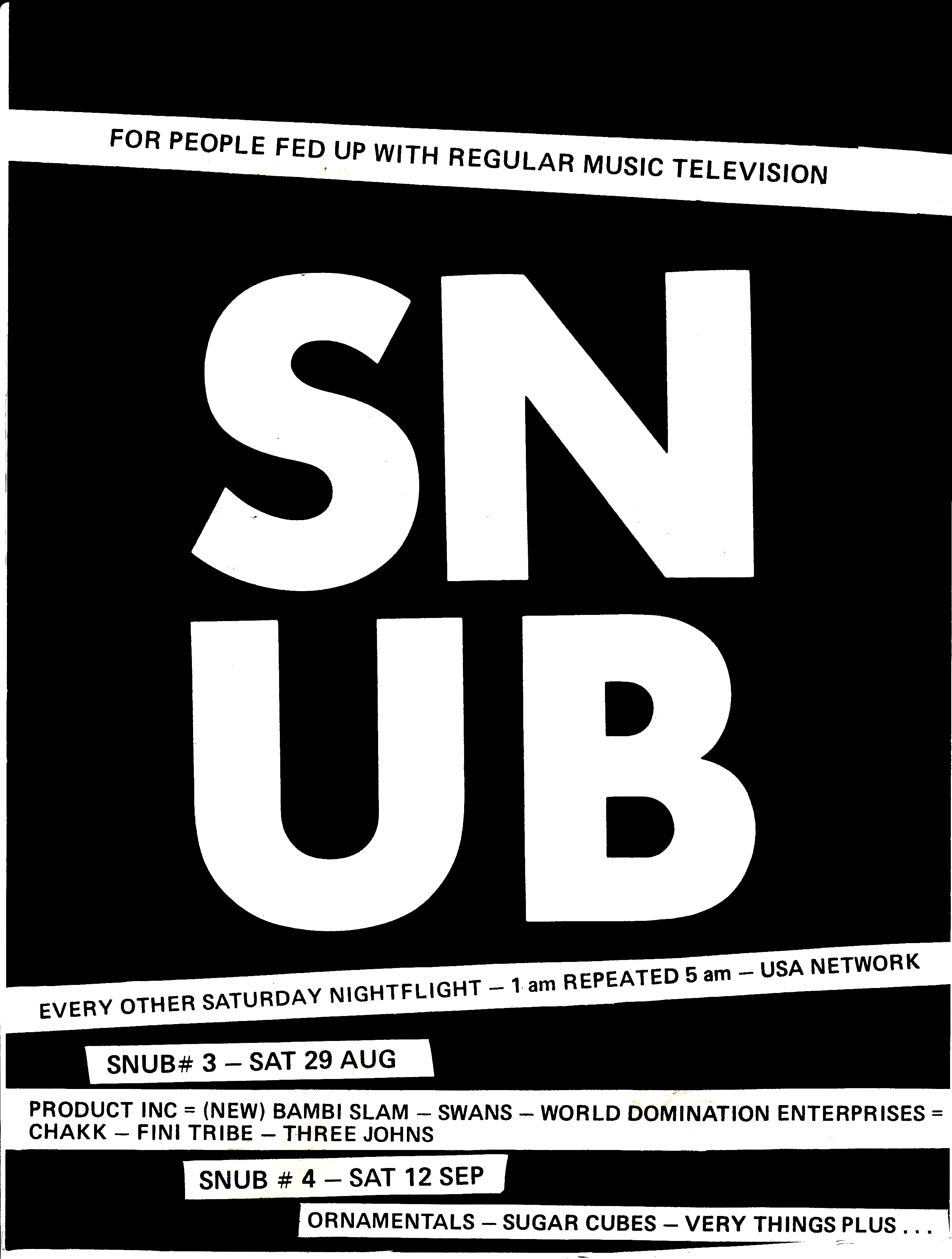

Snub TV (also known as simply Snub) is an alternative culture television programme that aired from 1987 to 1989 as a segment on the Night Flight overnight programming on the USA Network, and subsequently for three seasons on the BBC.

== Production ==
The original American program was developed by executive producer Fran Duffy and aired as part of Nightflight on a fortnightly basis. The first two seasons were produced in the United Kingdom by Pete Fowler and Brenda Kelly. A third season was produced in the United States by Duffy with help from Giorgio Gomelsky.

In 1989-1991 a British version, produced by Fowler and Kelly, aired for three seasons on the BBC, and was syndicated to the pan-European television channel Super Channel and in other countries in Europe, such as Russia, Portugal, Denmark and Greece.

== Content ==
Snub's early focus on emphasis on the indie and underground music scene in the United Kingdom was very much informed by Kelly's position as editor of The Catalogue, house magazine of The Cartel record distribution group, plus Fowler's work producing videos for bands. As the BBC show developed the program covered the rise of Madchester, documenting bands such as The Stone Roses. The British series also featured other acts such as comedians.

== Influence ==
Snub TV has been credited with giving many bands and musical acts initial or early television exposure vital to their careers.

== Archive release ==
In 2017 Fowler stated that plans to release a complete archive had been shelved due to lack of funds.
