= Krew Boylan =

Australian actress

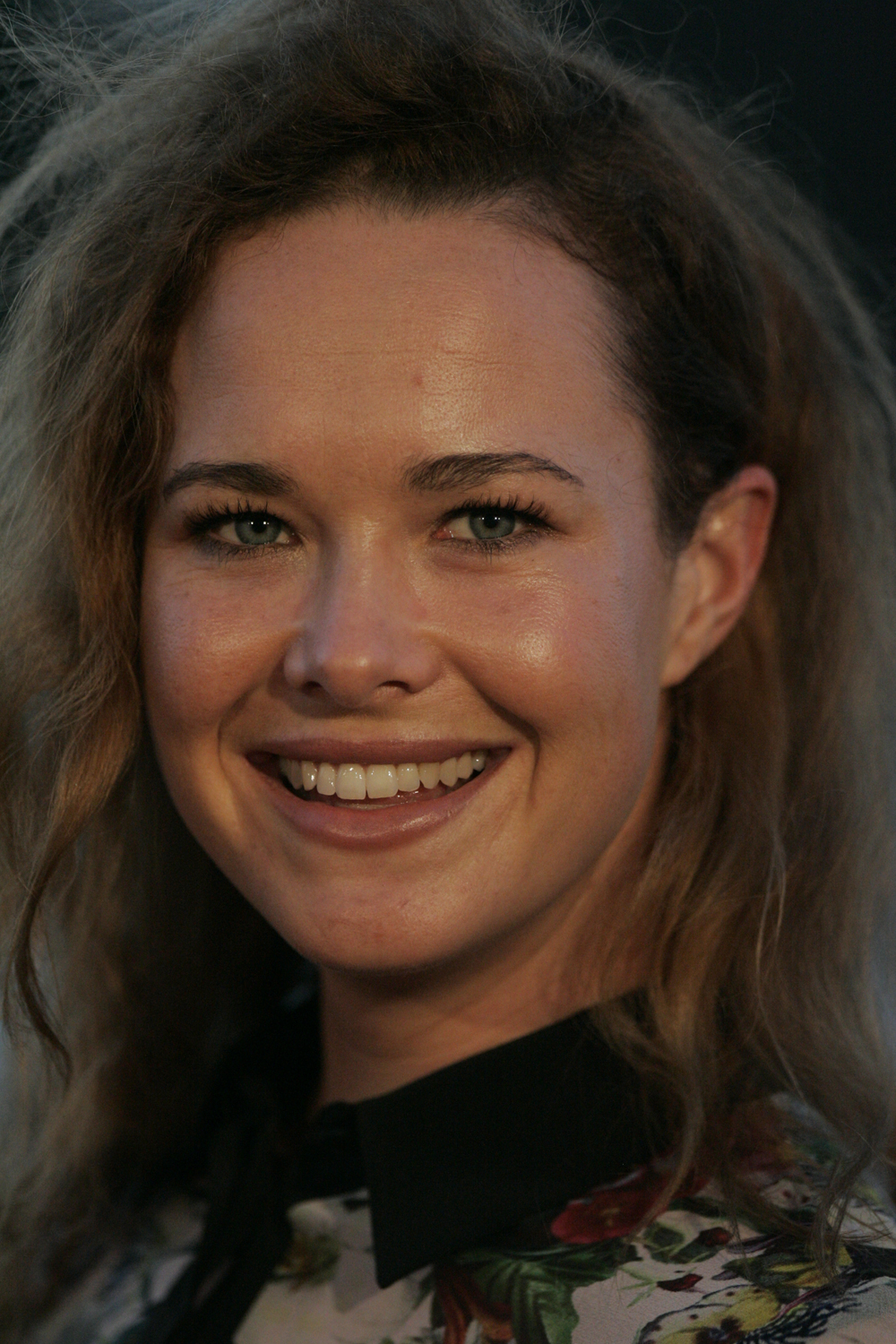
- Boylan in 2013
- Born: November 15, 1979 (age 47)
- Occupation: Actress
- Years active: 2004-present

Krew Boylan is an Australian actress. Boylan has appeared in different television programmes in her career, while she has appeared in many theatre productions. After initially filming only guest roles in ongoing series, Boylan secured a regular role in Seven Network's period drama series, Wild Boys. In 2010, Boylan portrayed the character of Mel in horror movie Primal. That year, the media dubbed her one of Australia's fastest rising stars.

== Career ==
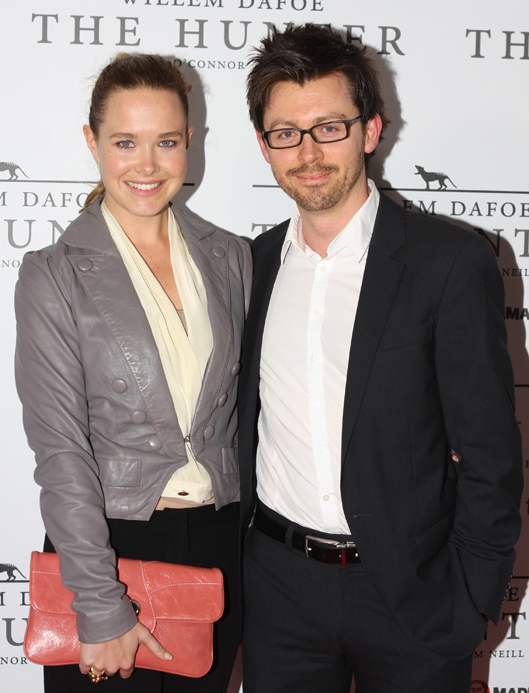
Boylan and director Matthew Moore at the premiere of The Hunter (2011)

In 2006 Boylan was starring in the theatre production of The Sisters Project and featured her own player interval. In 2009, Boylan starred as a lead in the high-profile theatre production, Bliss. Boylan played Oracle, the director Shannon Murphy stated that character was so central that the audiences were "actually watching the production through her mind."

In early 2010 The Daily Telegraph said that Boylan was the latest up and coming "it" actress from Australia. Boylan was then nominated for one of Cosmopolitan's "Fun, Fearless Female Woman Of The Year" awards. Boylan then started working on a production with Polly Stenham, titled Tusk Tusk. Cate Blanchett had personally chosen Boylan to appear in the production. She also continued with her career in theatre in the production of That Face, working with Maeve Dermody. Boylan also had a main role in Josh Reed's horror film Primal. Boylan played the character of Mel, a character who turns into a cannibal. Matthew Leyland of Total Film said that Boylan "downsized the fear factor" due to her appearance in the film, but added she approached the role well.

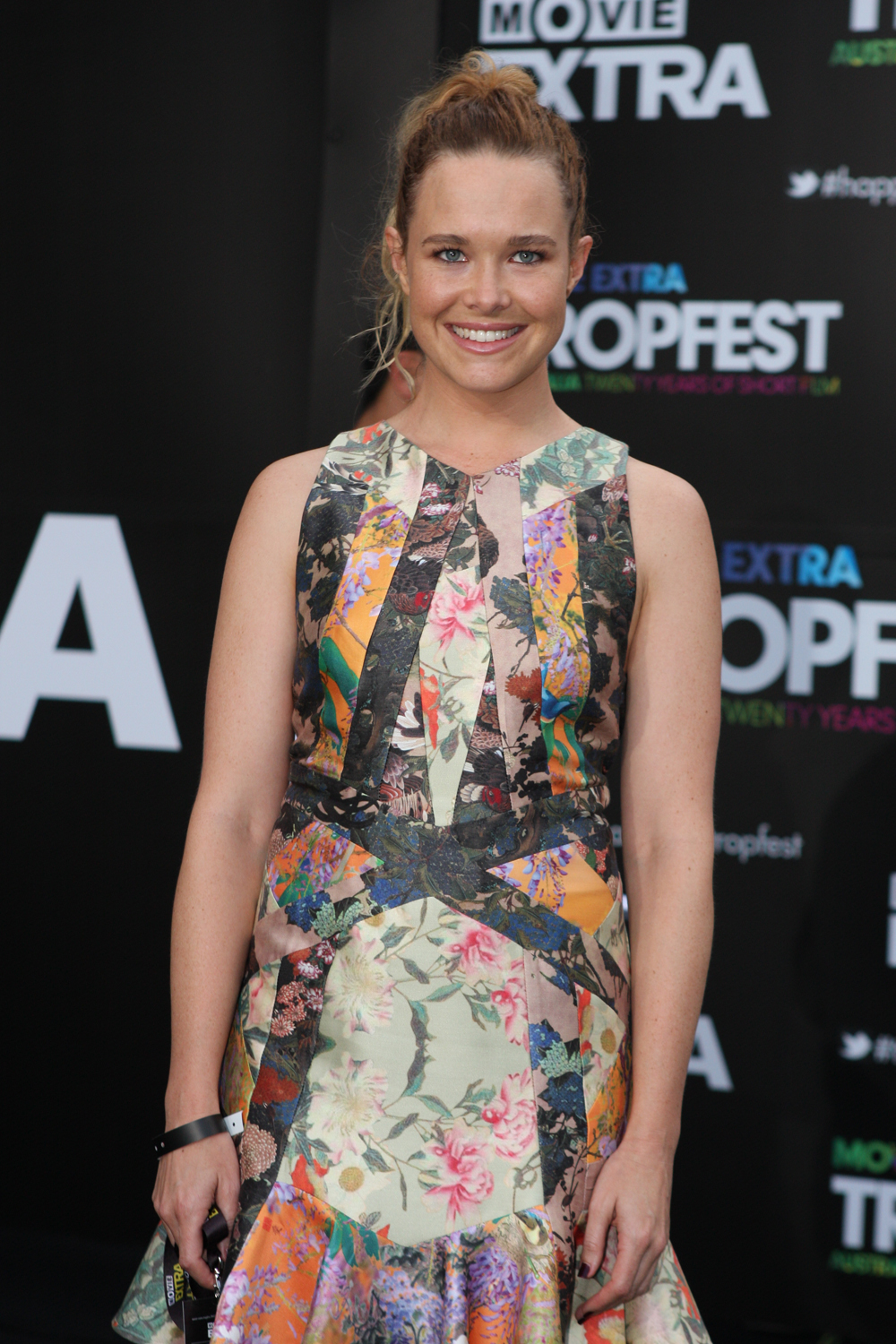
Boylan at Tropfest 2012

In 2011, it was announced that Boylan would star in Seven Network's period drama series, Wild Boys, as Ruby Rutherford. Boylan also made a parody music video titled "DUI Let's Get High". Alongside singer Priscilla Bonnet, they parodied two Hollywood actresses who drink and drive to become famous. The video was inspired by the personal issues actress Lindsay Lohan faced and celebrity blogger Perez Hilton promoted the video. It subsequently began to circulate on the film festival circuit and received a nomination at the 2011 LA Comedy Awards. In 2012, Boylan filmed for the role of Mary in the ABC television move Cliffy.

Boylan was cast as Schapelle Corby in the Nine Network's new telemovie, Schapelle, which aired in February 2014. Her role required her to undergo a drastic makeover. Boylan portrayed singer Lynne Randell in the 2016 miniseries Molly.

In 2022 Boylan appeared in Gracie Otto's film Seriously Red.

== Filmography ==
=== Film ===
Year	Title	Role	Notes
2002	Pancakes	Zoe	Short
2007	The Choir	Girl	Short
2007	The Choir		Video
2008	Let's Talk	Mum	Short
2008	Four	Diana	Short
2009	Invasion	Lara	Short
2009	Dream the Life	Mel	Short
2009	Dead Boring	Dawn	Short
2010	Primal	Mel	Main role
2011	Monkeys	Girlfriend	Short
2011	Shelling Peas	Michelle	Short
2011	The Office Mug	Jill	Short
2011	Fully Famous	Racquel	Short
2011	Attached	Abbie	Short
2012	The Mind Job	Izzy	Short
2014	Brawl		Short
2015	Super Awesome!	Tiffany Cooper	
2018	Desert Dash	Sherry	Short
2019	Martha the Monster	Trash Monster (voice)	Short film
2021	Shark	Bridesmaid	Short
2022	Seriously Red	Raylene “Red” - Dolly Parton impersonator -title role	Feature film

=== Television ===
Year	Title	Role	Notes
2004	All Saints	Jenny Flinders	Guest role
2005	All Saints	Leigh Sands	Guest role
2007	McLeod's Daughters	Ava	Guest role
2008	All Saints	Simone Collie	Guest role
2009	Rescue: Special Ops	Greta	Guest role
2009–2011	Dirtgirlworld	Grubby	Main role
2011	At Home With Julia	Checkout Chick	Guest role
2011	Wild Boys	Ruby Rutherford	Regular role
2013	Cliffy	Mary	TV movie
2013–2018	A Place to Call Home	Amy Polson	Recurring role
2014	Schapelle	Schapelle Corby	Main role
2016	Molly	Lynne Randell	Miniseries: 2 episodes
2018	Sando	Susie Sandringham	TV series: 6 episodes
2022	The Secrets She Keeps	Karen	TV series: 4 episodes
2023	Mother and Son	Simone	TV series; 1 episode
2023-24	Paper Dolls (TV series)	Camille	TV series: 2 episodes
