= Eat the Rich (film) =

1987 British black comedy film

- Directed by: Peter Richardson
- Written by: Peter Richardson; Pete Richens
- Produced by: Tim Van Rellim
- Starring: Ronald Allen; Sandra Dorne; Jimmy Fagg; Lemmy; Lanah Pellay; Nosher Powell; Fiona Richmond; Ron Tarr
- Production companies: Channel 4 Films; Iron Fist Motion Pictures; Michael White Productions
- Distributed by: Recorded Releasing
- Release date: 17 August 1987
- Running time: 89 minutes
- Country: United Kingdom
- Language: English

Eat the Rich is a 1987 British black comedy film directed by Peter Richardson, who also wrote the screenplay with Pete Richens. A co-production between Channel 4 Films, Iron Fist Motion Pictures and Michael White Productions, it features cast members from the popular television series The Comic Strip Presents....

The film stars Lanah Pellay as Alex, Nosher Powell as the Home Secretary, and a number of cameos, including by Miranda Richardson, Nigel Planer, Robbie Coltrane, Rik Mayall, Paul McCartney, Shane MacGowan, Jennifer Saunders, Jimmy Fagg, Kathy Burke, Koo Stark, Sandie Shaw, Dawn French, Bill Wyman, Jools Holland, Hugh Cornwell, Adrian Edmondson, Angela Bowie and Lemmy.

The film initially focuses on a waiter in a high-class restaurant, who is met with constant contempt by the customers. After being fired, he forms an anarchist gang who attack and take over the restaurant. They start serving the clients and their former co-workers as food for other rich people. A number of would-be revolutionaries have figured out the gang's scheme and try to use them in a scheme against their own archenemy, the loutish Home Secretary.

== Plot ==
Alex is a waiter in high-class London restaurant Bastards, subject to the upper-class customers' daily contempt. He is fired for being rude to the clientele. After witnessing a terrorist act on an embassy, he robs a benefits office and goes on the run with his new friend.

The Home Secretary is a menacing, beer-swilling, fornicating lout with his own way of dealing with trouble, usually with his fists. He is the darling of the voters, the press, and Fiona, a glamorous KGB agent. It was he who ended the terrorist situation earlier. His enemies include the sinister Commander Fortune, who plots a people's revolution with a difference, and General Karprov and Spider, who plot to derail the Home Secretary's campaign to become prime minister.

Alex returns to Bastards with a four-person team of anarchists and lays waste to the clientele and staff. He serves them up for consumption by other rich people in their new restaurant, and changed from Bastards to Eat the Rich. When Commander Fortune and Spider realise what's on the menu they formulate a plot to get rid of the conservative Home Secretary for good.

== Cast ==
- Shane MacGowan as Terrorist
- Ronald Allen as Commander Fortune
- Lanah Pellay as Alex
- Nosher Powell as Nosher
- Kathy Burke as Kathy
- Robbie Coltrane as Jeremy
- Fiona Richmond as Fiona
- Sean Chapman as Mark
- Rik Mayall as Micky
- Peter Richardson as Henry
- Jimmy Fagg as Jimmy
- Jennifer Saunders as Lady Caroline
- Adrian Edmondson as Charles
- Hugh Cornwell
- Dawn French as Debbie Draws
- Katrin Cartlidge as Katrin
- Paul McCartney as Banquet Guest
- Koo Stark as Hazel
- Lemmy as Spider
- Les Bubb as Waiter
- Nigel Planer as DHSS Manager
- Miranda Richardson as DHSS Blonde
- Jools Holland as Sun Reporter
- Rowland Rivron as Star Reporter
- JoAnne Good as Jaqueline
- Ron Tarr as Ron
- Bill Wyman as Toilet Victim
- Debbie Linden as Layla
- Sue Lloyd as Val
- Christopher Malcolm as Steinbeck
- Derren Nesbitt as Manager
- Daniel Peacock as Terence
- Pete Richens as Cafe Owner
- Marika Rivera as Marika
- Sandie Shaw as Edgeley's Girlfriend
- Rupert Vansittart as Rupert
- Steve Walsh as Record Executive
- Phil Taylor as Drummer at party
- Phil Campbell as Guitarist at party

== Reception ==
The film performed poorly at the box office, taking $200,723 across 4 screens in the USA. Channel 4 were disappointed with the returns on the film and shelved another Richardson project, Five Go To Hell.

On Rotten Tomatoes the film has a score of 36% based on reviews from 11 critics.

Hal Hinson writing in The Washington Post gave it a lukewarm review, writing "The punk jaggedness they bring to their derivations is the only hint of originality, but this, too, seems a little staid. It feels like punk on the downward swing, after most of its rude energy has dissipated." Vincent Canby of The New York Times gave it a positive review and drew comparisons to "an upscale John Waters satire" and "Jean-Luc Godard's pre-Maoist period." Another Washington Post reviewer, Desson Howe, also compared the film with Waters's work, albeit more negatively, saying it was "a forced-feeding of a comedy that's tough to swallow" that "has all the tastelessness of, say, a John Waters film, but none of its subtle graces."

In January 1988 the film was one of those attacked for its critique of Thatcherite society by University of Oxford historian Norman Stone, which he condemned in The Sunday Times as being "worthless and insulting" and "riddled with left wing bias".

Eat The Rich featured at #49 in Time Out London's list of "Cinema's 50 greatest flops, follies and failures." The feature stated: "[The film] may not have had the budget to be considered a true flop, but the back-alley production values and total lack of comic invention on display in this Thatcher-baiting misstep meant that any hopes of a Pythonesque run at the movies were knocked way back on their heels."

== Soundtrack ==
The soundtrack album was released on the Filmtrax label, and featured six tracks by Motörhead, including the track "Eat the Rich", written especially for the film. The track also appeared on the Motörhead album Rock 'n' Roll, and was released in the UK as a single in its own right. It also featured a solo track, "Bess", by Würzel (Motörhead's second guitarist at the time).

The remaining Motorhead tracks are from their album Orgasmatron.

The soundtrack album also featured several pieces of incidental music from the film, as well as the synthpop track "Pistol in My Pocket" by Alan Pillay (credited as Lannah).

=== Track listing ===
1. Motörhead – "Eat the Rich"
2. Simon Brint – "Terrorists"
3. Motörhead – "Built for Speed"
4. Danny Eccleston – "Nosher in the Bar"
5. Motörhead – "Nothing Up My Sleeve"
6. Simon Brint – "Arriba Salsa"
7. Motörhead – "Doctor Rock"
8. Motörhead – "On the Road (Live)"
9. Lannah – "Pistol in My Pocket"
10. Simon Brint – "Car Approach"
11. Motörhead – "Orgasmatron"
12. Würzel – "Bess"
13. Danny Eccleston – "End Titles Theme"
