= Inside Track =

Inside Track was an award winning British property investment information company that went into administration in April 2008 following a sharp downturn in the UK property market. Its sister company, Instant Access Properties, which sold properties to Inside Track clients, entered administration in September 2008, primarily as a result of the global economic crisis.

The company advertised in newspapers, on radio and TV and through mailshots, inviting customers to attend a free property investment session. The company offered free seminars that claimed to give insights into property investment, with a view to getting attendees to a paid two-day course.

Many potential customers did not have the time or skills to locate suitable properties, even after the training courses. To respond to client demand, Inside Track created 'Instant Access Properties', a sister company of Inside Track, designed to research and source "off market" opportunities for buy-to-let properties. These were typically off-plan properties, with the stated aim of achieving price appreciation before the property had been built, and with a view to holding the property on a medium or even long-term basis. Inside Track received a portion of the purchase price for this service, 3% if purchased through its sister company Inside Access Properties. Properties bought through the Instant Access company were sold at a nominal 15% discount (in order to access buy-to-let mortgages, which typically required a minimum 85% loan-to-value ratio).

With house price growth mostly over 10% each year continuing until 2007, some of Inside Track's 25,000 customers did not make money as the company was over inflating valuations and most customers ended up losing money, many of the developments were not finished, it was rapidly found that the system used relied on a constantly rising market and very lax mortgage lending and the company went into administration in April 2008.

Inside Track's methodology was based on gearing, with customers encouraged to borrow against properties in order to buy more, a methodology that broke down when the property market went into free fall in 2007/8.

== History ==
Inside Track was set up in 2001 by Jim Moore & Kim Moore. Two years later they were joined by Co-founder and Vice Chairman Brad Rosser, ex Corporate Development Director of the Virgin Group. The company grew quickly, spending heavily on marketing and direct mail, and making to year end April 30, 2006, profits of £10.9m on turnover of £44.8m. To year end March 31, 2007, 25,265 people attended its free seminars, and 3,834 signed up to attend the paid-for seminars.

Vice Chairman, Brad Rosser, (Ex Virgin Group & McKinsey consulting) was recruited. The business was marketed by Ernst & Young throughout 2006/7 and a £80m bid from a well known high street bank in 2008 was withdrawn as the market downturn started.

Once the UK property market began to decline, sentiment turned against property and financing became harder to secure. Inside Track, the property seminar company was no longer able to gain new potential investors, and it went into administration in April 2008. The sister property sales firm, Instant Access Properties, facing numerous cancelled construction projects, went into administration in September 2008 leaving 4,500 people unable to complete on their purchases.

Moore, the company's original founder, subsequently, injected substantial personal funding (3,000,000 GBP) to support these 4500 clients through to completion using a new company, IAP Global Limited. A former director of Chestertons estate agents, Anthony McKay was hired to manage the day-to-day affairs of the business, along with 'consumer champion' Louisa Fletcher (News of the World & ITN). In 2010, unable to successfully help clients raise mortgage finance, IAP Global went into liquidation.

== Administration ==
Due to a sharp decline in UK property market sentiment in the wake of the credit crunch, Inside Track Seminars Ltd., which ran the seminars, went into administration in April 2008.

== Related Companies ==
- Fuel, a mortgage broker specialising in buy to let finance. (now closed)
- Instant Access Properties, a property finding service for buy to let investors (now closed)
- IAP Global Limited (now closed)
