= Gracie Otto =

Australian filmmaker

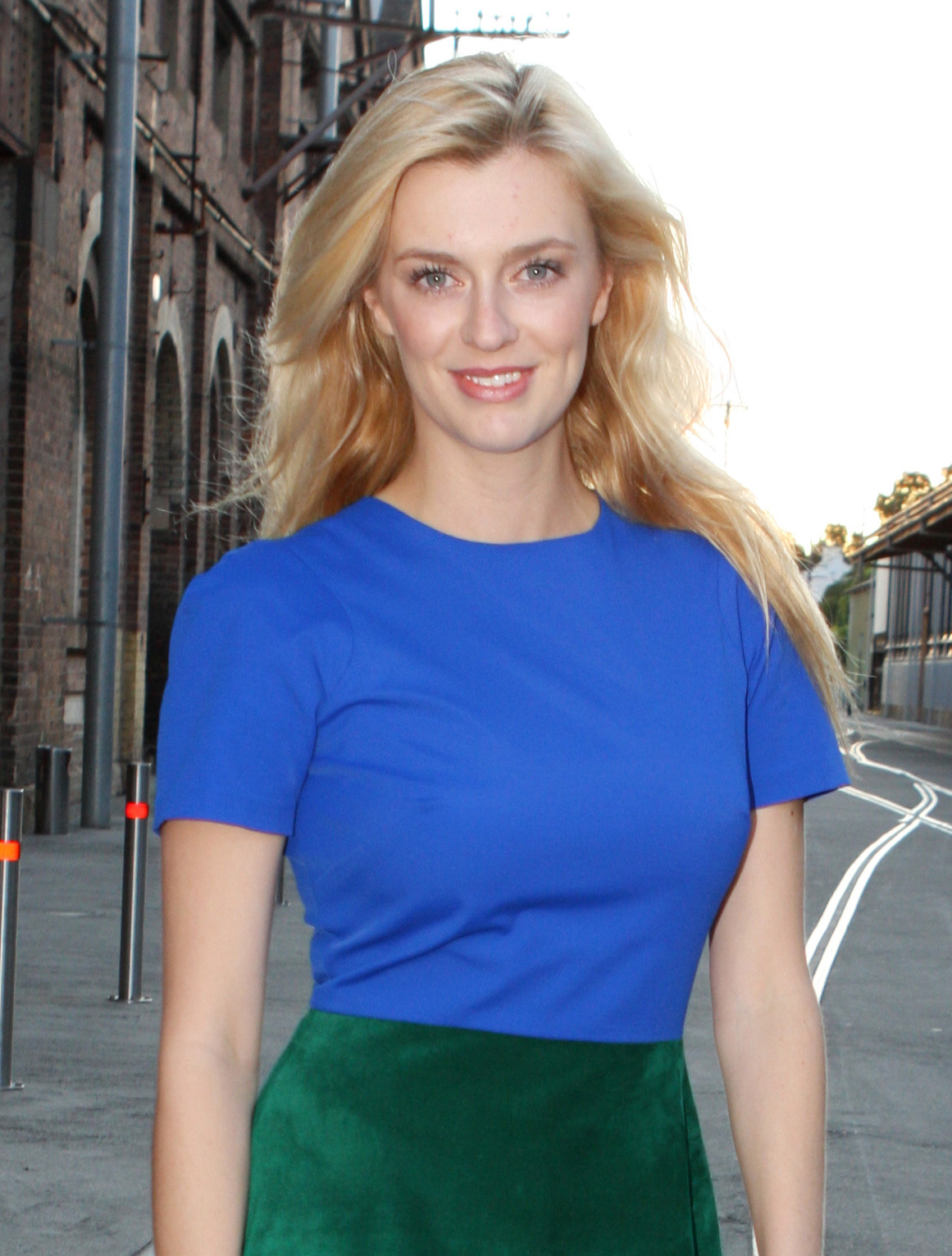
- Occupation: Director
- Years active: 2005–present
- Parent(s): Barry Otto; Susan Hill
- Relatives: Miranda Otto (half-sister)
- Website: www.gracieotto.tv

Gracie Otto is an Australian film and television director.

== Early life and education ==
Gracie Otto is the daughter of the Australian actor Barry Otto and Susan Hill. Actress Miranda Otto is her half-sister, and she has a brother, Eddie, who is a teacher.

She attended Burwood Girls High School in Sydney. As a schoolgirl, Otto represented Australia and New South Wales in indoor soccer, and represented her home state New South Wales in school softball, and considered a career in sport. However, thanks to a new course in screen production introduced by a teacher while she was there, Otto became interested in directing and editing films.

== Career ==
=== Directing ===
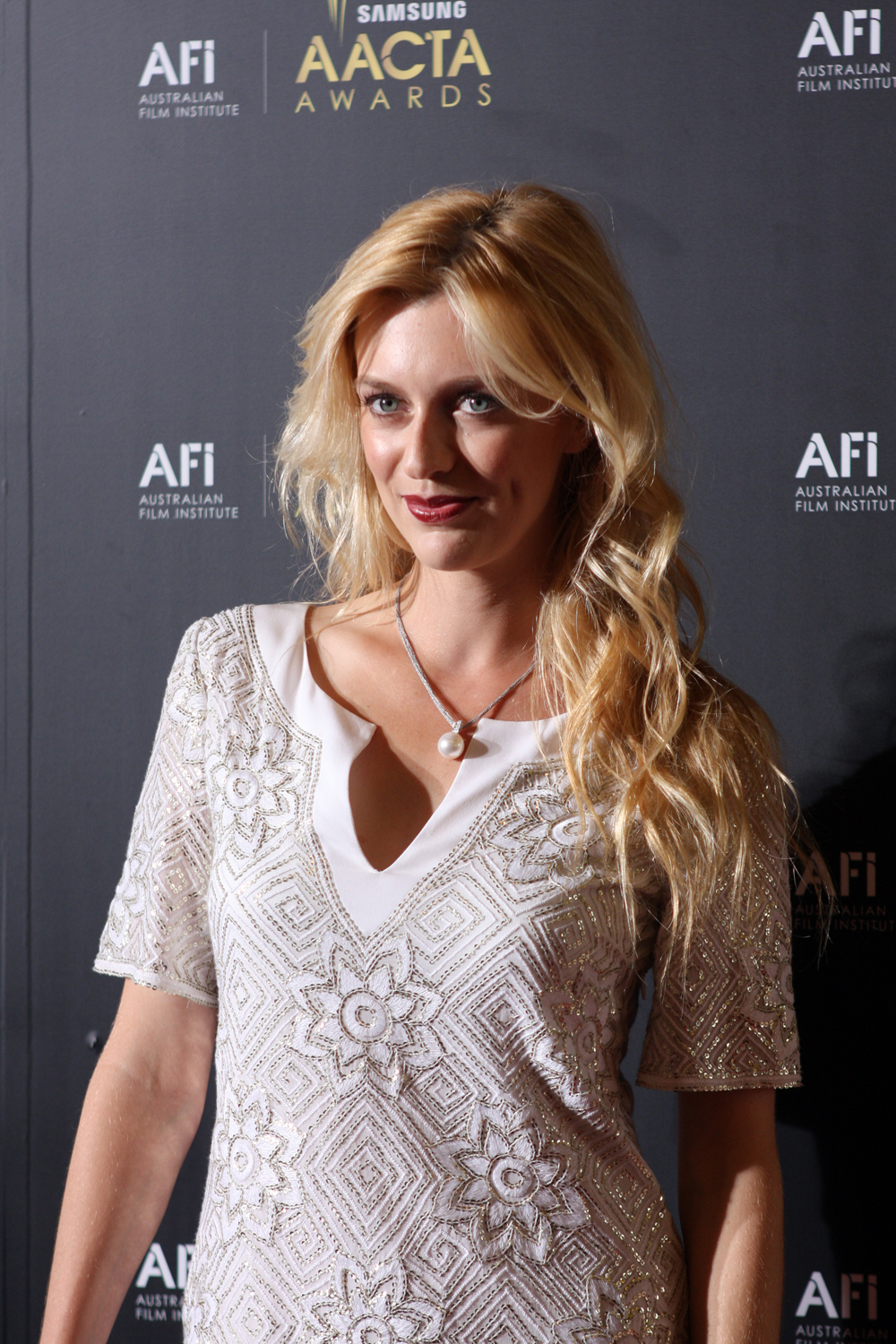
Otto at the 1st AACTA Awards, 2012

Otto's feature-length directing debut was the 2014 documentary The Last Impresario, about prolific British theatre impresario and film producer Michael White. The film had its world premiere at the BFI London Film Festival in October 2013, where it was positively received by critics. It features interviews with 60 of White's friends and associates, including Kate Moss, Anna Wintour, and Yoko Ono.

In 2019, after winning the North American Script Competition through Soho House in the US, Gracie directed a short film titled Desert Dash, which premiered at the Toronto International Film Festival.

In 2019, Otto was the director of the second series of the Stan original, The Other Guy starring Matt Okine, Claudia Karvan, and Harriet Dyer.

Otto directed three of the ten episodes in the first series of the Stan Original series Bump, starring Claudia Karvan and Angus Sampson.

In 2021, Otto's second feature documentary Under the Volcano, about music producer George Martin's 1980s recording studio in Montserrat, was released through Universal Pictures. It featured interviews with Sting, Mark Knopfler, and Jimmy Buffett and premiered at South by Southwest in Austin, Texas.

In 2022, she directed seven episodes of the Netflix comedy drama series Heartbreak High, for which she was nominated for the AACTA Award for Best Direction in Drama or Comedy. Heartbreak High won the International Emmy Award for Best Kids: Live-Action and was hugely popular.

In 2022, Otto directed her first feature film, Seriously Red, a romantic comedy starring Krew Boylan, Daniel Webber, Celeste Barber, Bobby Cannavale, and Rose Byrne. The film premiered at South by Southwest on 13 March 2022. It was released theatrically in Australia on 24 November 2022 by Roadshow Films.

Otto directed two episodes for Deadloch, an Australian black comedy crime mystery that premiered on Amazon Prime Video on 2 June 2023, created by Kate McCartney and Kate McLennan.

In 2023, Otto directed four episodes for Disney+ of The Clearing (TV series) starring Teresa Palmer, Guy Pearce and Miranda Otto.

Otto directed the whole series of Ladies in Black, an Australian television drama series based on the novel The Women in Black by Madeleine St John and second adaptation after the 2018 film, Ladies in Black. It aired on ABC on 16 June 2024, starring Debi Mazar.

In 2025, Otto’s third feature documentary, Otto by Otto, won the AACTA Award for Best Feature Length Documentary. Interviewees include Neil Armfield, Gillian Armstrong, Ray Lawrence, Cate Blanchett, Baz Luhrmann, John Bell, and Miranda Otto.

== Filmography ==
=== As director ===
- Kill Blondes (2004)
- Broken Beat (2005)
- Tango Trois (2006)
- La Meme Nuit (2007)
- Seamstress (2011)
- La Cabane a Marseille (2012)
- Yearling (2012)
- Parfum de Regrets (2012)
- Fashion Lust (2013)
- The Last Impresario (2013)
- Candy Crush (with Thom Kerr) (2017)
- Desert Dash (2018)
- The Other Guy (Season 2) (2019)
- Bump (2020)
- Under the Volcano (2021)
- Seriously Red (2022)
- Heartbreak High (2022–2024, 7 episodes)
- The Artful Dodger (2023, 2 episodes)
- The Clearing (2023)
- Deadloch (2023)
- Otto by Otto (2024)
- Ladies in Black (2024, 6 episodes)

=== As actress ===
- Eve (2005)
- The New Life (2006)
- Good Luck with That (2007)
- Three Blind Mice (2008)
- Sea Patrol (2009)
- L.B.F. (2011)
