= Jimmy Fagg =

British comedian (1929–2010)

- Born: 29 December 1929; Gravesend, Kent, England
- Died: 3 January 2010 (aged 80); London, England

James S. Fagg (29 December 1929 – 3 January 2010) was an English stand-up comedian, musician and actor. He is most notable for his roles in the Comic Strip Presents.. and in other British comedy films.

== Life and career ==
Fagg had a long spell as a musician in the Royal Marines until 1960. During this time, he is reported to have been accused of mutiny on two occasions. On both occasions, however, he was excused from any punishment; it is believed due to his charm and wit as a comedian.

During his time as a marine Fagg forged a career as a stand-up comedy actor, performing in the traditional pub circuit of musicians. He performed in a number of pubs in the East End of London throughout this time. He became most popular as a weekend performer at The Imperial Crown pub, performing every Friday, Saturday and Sunday nights. His talent as a pianist was often at the core of his performances. Both his talent as a musician and as a comedian were honed during his time in the band of the Royal Marines.

While performing in the early 1980s, his talent as a comic was spotted by the then newly formed Comic Strip. He appeared on a number of the features produced by them including; The Bullshitters: South Atlantic Raiders: Part 2 Argie Bargie!, GLC: The Carnage Continues, Oxford, Spaghetti Hoops, Les Dogs, The Crying Game, Detectives on the Edge of a Nervous Breakdown, Space Virgins from Planet Sex, Queen of the Wild Frontier.

As well as the films produced as part of the Comic Strip Presents... series, he also appeared in a number of feature films; Walter (1982), Eat the Rich (1987) and The Imitators (1996).

Fagg died in London on 3 January 2010, at the age of 80.

== List of acting roles ==
Walter – Hospital Patient – (1984)
The Bullshitters: Roll out the Gunbarrel – Himself – (1984)
Eat the Rich – Jimmy – (1987)
South Atlantic Raiders: Part 2 Argie Bargie! – Soldier – (1990)
GLC: The Carnage Continues – Soldier/2nd Workman – (1990)
Oxford – Don – (1990)
Spaghetti Hoops – Newsvendor – (1990)
Les Dogs – Groom's Uncle – (1990)
The Crying Game – Lift Man – (1992)
Detectives on the Edge of a Nervous Breakdown – East End Drinker/Landlord – 1993)
Space Virgins from Planet Sex – Nappy Lorry Driver – (1993)
Queen of the Wild Frontier – Ken – (1993)
The Imitators – Truck Driver – (1996)
Minder – If Money Be The Food Of Love, Play On – Pub Pianist / Comedian – (1984)
