= Michael White (producer) =

British theatre/film producer (1936–2016)

- Born: Michael Simon White; 16 January 1936; Glasgow, Scotland
- Died: 7 March 2016 (aged 80); Ojai, California, U.S.
- Education: Lyceum Alpinum Zuoz, Switzerland
- Alma mater: University of Paris
- Occupations: Theatre producer, film producer
- Years active: 1961–2013
- Notable work: Oh! Calcutta!, 1970 West End; Sleuth, 1971 Broadway; Joseph and the Amazing Technicolor Dreamcoat, 1973 West End; The Rocky Horror Show, 1973 West End; Monty Python and the Holy Grail, 1974 (film); The Rocky Horror Picture Show, 1975 (film); A Chorus Line, 1976 West End; Jabberwocky, 1977 (film); Annie, 1978 West End; My Dinner With Andre, 1981 (film); The Comic Strip Presents, 1982 (television); She Loves Me, 1994 West End revival
- Awards: Tony Award for Best Play; 1971: Sleuth; Laurence Olivier Award for Best Musical Revival; 1994: She Loves Me; Critics' Circle Theatre Award for Best Musical; 1994: She Loves Me; Evening Standard Award for Best Musical; 1973: The Rocky Horror Show; 1976: A Chorus Line; 1978: Annie; Evening Standard British Film Award for Best Film; 1982: Moonlighting; 1983: The Ploughman's Lunch; Boston Society of Film Critics Best American Film; 1982: My Dinner With Andre

Michael Simon White (16 January 1936 – 7 March 2016) was a British theatrical impresario and film producer. White was responsible for the productions of 101 stage shows and 27 theatrical films over the span of 50 years.

== Early life ==
Michael White was born in Glasgow, Scotland, the son of Victor White, a merchant who ran a glove making business, and Doris (née Cohen), a property developer. His parents were from Eastern European Jewish backgrounds. As White suffered from asthma as a boy, his parents decided he would be educated as a boarder at the Lyceum Alpinum Zuoz in Switzerland from age 7, where he was the only boy who did not speak the French language. He then graduated from the Sorbonne in Paris.

== Career ==
After working as a Wall Street runner in New York City in the 1950s, White took an interest in theatre, spending five years as assistant to Sir Peter Daubeny for his World Theatre seasons in London.

White produced his first West End play, the London premiere of Jack Gelber's The Connection in 1961. Known for bringing the risqué to the stage his productions included Sleuth, Oh! Calcutta!, Two Gentlemen of Verona and the original Theatre Upstairs production of The Rocky Horror Show.

Concurrently, White produced films, including the film version of The Rocky Horror Picture Show and Monty Python and the Holy Grail (both 1975). Later, he was responsible for The Comic Strip Presents... with Peter Richardson, which began on the opening night of Channel 4 in 1982.

However, losses on films mounted, and he was declared bankrupt in 2005 after suffering a heart attack at the Mondrian Hotel in Los Angeles.

== Media ==
White's autobiography, Empty Seats, was published in 1985.

White's life story was the subject of the 2013 documentary film The Last Impresario, directed by Gracie Otto. The film made its world premiere at the BFI London Film Festival in October 2013, where it was positively received by critics.

== Personal life ==
White was married twice. With his first wife, the 1960s model and designer Sarah Hillsdon (1965-1972), he had three children. In 1985, he married Louise Moores, 26 years his junior, daughter of John Moores, of the family that owned the Littlewoods pools, mail order and retail group; they had a son.

White died on 7 March 2016 of heart failure, aged 80.

== Selected theatrical productions ==
This list is incomplete, currently listing only White's most notable theatre works:

=== Musicals ===
As producer:

- Oh! Calcutta! (1970, West End)
- Joseph and the Amazing Technicolor Dreamcoat (1973, West End)
- The Rocky Horror Show (1973, West End)
- Two Gentlemen of Verona (1973, West End)
- A Chorus Line (1976, West End)
- Annie (1978, West End)
- She Loves Me (1994, West End revival)

=== Plays ===
As producer:

- Sleuth (1971, Broadway)
- City Sugar (1978)

== Filmography ==
As producer or executive producer:

- Monty Python and the Holy Grail (1974)
- The Rocky Horror Picture Show (1975)
- Jabberwocky (1977)
- The Hound of the Baskervilles (1978)
- Going with the Wind (1981)
- My Dinner With Andre (1981)
- Polyester (1981)
- Shock Treatment (1981)
- Countryman (1982)
- Moonlighting (1982)
- Urgh! A Music War (1982)
- The Comic Strip Presents... (1982)
- Dead on Time (1983)
- Heat and Dust (1983)
- The Ploughman's Lunch (1983)
- Strangers Kiss (1983)
- The Supergrass (1985)
- High Season (1987)
- Eat the Rich (1987)
- White Mischief (1987)
- The Deceivers (1988)
- Nuns on the Run (1989)
- The Pope Must Die (1991)
- Robert's Movie (1994)
- Widows' Peak (1994)
- Enigma (2001)

Appearing as himself:

- The Last Impresario (2013)
