= Big Lie (disambiguation) =

A big lie is a propaganda technique used for political purpose.

Big Lie may also refer to:

== Books ==
- The Big Lie, a 1991 children's novel by David Day
- The Big Lie, a 2008 book by Anthony Neilson
- The Big Lie, 2015 novel by Julie Mayhew which won the Sidewise Award for Alternate History
- The Big Lie: Exposing the Nazi Roots of the American Left, a 2017 book by Dinesh D'Souza
- The Big Lie: Election Chaos, Political Opportunism, and the State of American Politics After 2020, a 2022 book by Jonathan Lemire

== Film and television ==
- The Big Lie (1951 film), a US Army anti-communist propaganda film
- The Big Lie (1956 film) (Spanish: La gran mentira), a Spanish film directed by Rafael Gil
- The Big Lie (2012 film), an Israeli social drama film
- Oh, Jeremy Corbyn: The Big Lie, a 2023 English political documentary film
- "The Big Lie", a 1992 pilot episode of McGee and Me!
- "The Big Lie", a 1999 episode of Voltron: The Third Dimension

== Music ==
- "The Big Lie", a song by Gigolo Aunts
- "Big Lie" (Post Malone song), 2016
- "The Big Lie", a 1965 song by Gene Chandler, B-side of "Nothing Can Stop Me"
- "Big Lie", a 2021 song by Van Morrison from the album Latest Record Project, Volume 1

== See also ==
- de:Big Lie, a conspiracy narrative by Donald Trump (in German Wikipedia)
- 9/11: The Big Lie, a book by Thierry Meyssan about the September 11 attacks
