= Peace symbols =

Symbols to promote peace

The symbol designed for the British nuclear disarmament movement in 1958 is now widely known as the "peace sign".

A number of peace symbols have been used many ways in various cultures and contexts. The dove and olive branch was used symbolically by early Christians and then eventually became a secular peace symbol, popularized by a Dove lithograph by Pablo Picasso after World War II. In the 1950s, the "peace sign", as it is known today (also known as "peace and love"), was designed by Gerald Holtom as the logo for the British Campaign for Nuclear Disarmament (CND), a group at the forefront of the peace movement in the UK, and adopted by anti-war and counterculture activists in the US and elsewhere. The symbol is a superposition of the flag semaphore signals for the letters "N" and "D", taken to stand for "nuclear disarmament", while simultaneously acting as a reference to Goya's The Third of May 1808 (1814) (aka "Peasant Before the Firing Squad").

The V hand signal and the peace flag also became international peace symbols.

== Olive branch ==
=== Classical antiquity ===
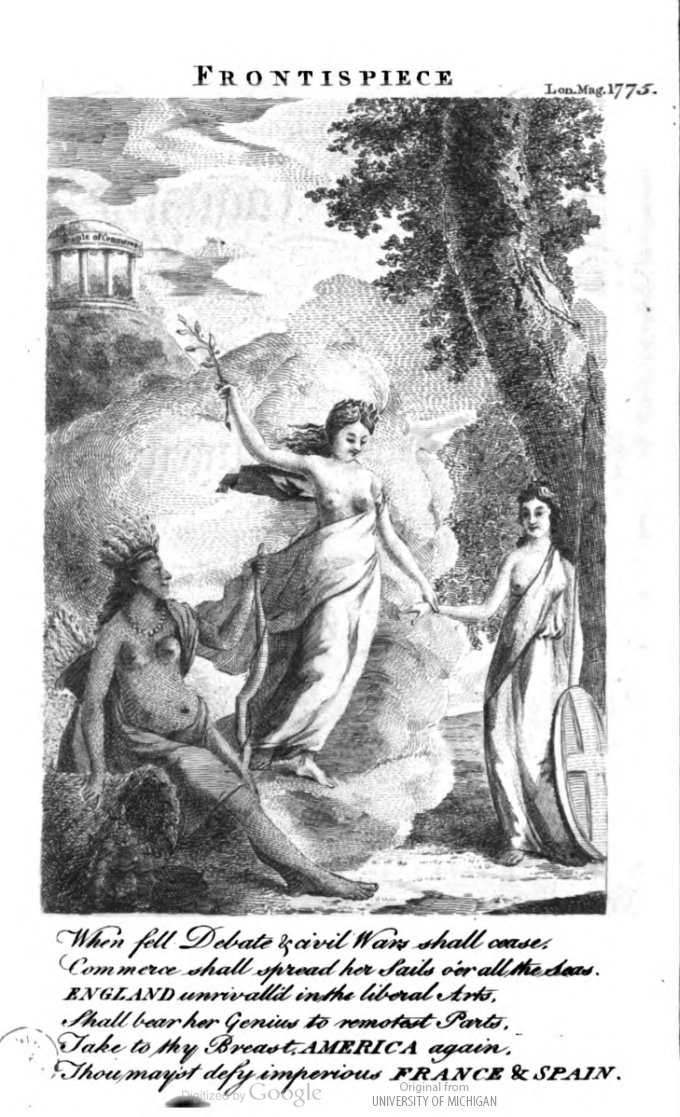
An engraving from The London Magazine, January 1775, showing the Goddess of Peace bringing an olive branch to America and Britannia

The use of the olive branch as a symbol of peace in Western civilization dates at least to 5th century BC Greece. The olive branch, which the Greeks believed represented plenty and drove away evil spirits, was one of the attributes of Eirene, the Greek goddess of peace. Eirene (whom the Romans called Pax), appeared on Roman Imperial coins with an olive branch.

The Roman poet Virgil (70–10 BC) associated "the plump olive" with Pax and he used the olive branch as a symbol of peace in his Aeneid:

High on the stern Aeneas his stand,
And held a branch of olive in his hand,
While thus he spoke: "The Phrygians' arms you see,
Expelled from Troy, provoked in Italy
By Latian foes, with war unjustly made;
At first affianced, and at last betrayed.
This message bear: The Trojans and their chief
Bring holy peace, and beg the king's relief."

The Romans believed there was an intimate relationship between war and peace. Mars, the god of war, had another aspect, Mars Pacifer, Mars the bringer of Peace, who is shown on coins of the later Roman Empire bearing an olive branch. Appian describes the use of the olive-branch as a gesture of peace by the enemies of the Roman general Scipio Aemilianus in the Numantine War and by Hasdrubal of Carthage.

=== Later representations ===
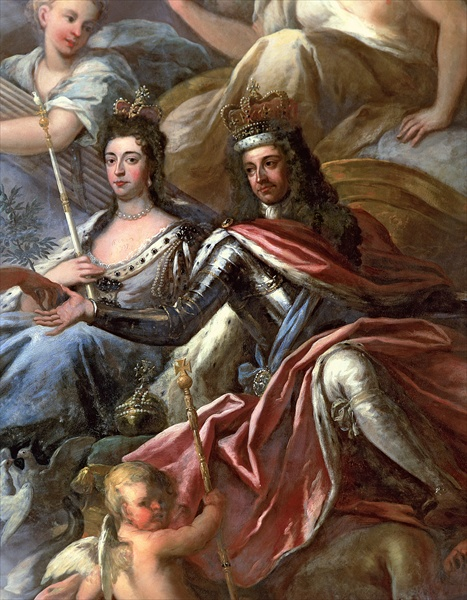
James Thornhill, Peace and Liberty Triumphing Over Tyranny

Poets of the 17th century associated the olive branch with peace. A Charles I gold coin of 1644 shows the monarch with sword and olive branch. Throughout the 18th century, English coins show Britannia with a spear and olive branch.

The Old Royal Naval College, Greenwich, contains an allegorical painting by James Thornhill, Peace and Liberty Triumphing Over Tyranny (1708–1716), depicting King William III and Queen Mary (who had enacted the English Bill of Rights) enthroned in heaven with the Virtues behind them. Peace, with her doves and lambs, hands an olive branch to William, who in turn hands the cap of liberty to Europe, where absolute monarchy prevails. Below William is the defeated French king, Louis XIV.

In January 1775, the frontispiece of the London Magazine published an engraving of Peace descending on a cloud from the Temple of Commerce, bringing an olive branch to America and Britannia. In July that year, the American Continental Congress adopted the "Olive Branch Petition" in the hope of avoiding a full-blown war with Great Britain.

On the Great Seal of the United States (1782), the olive branch denotes peace, as explained by Charles Thomson, Secretary to Congress: "The Olive branch and arrows denote the power of peace & war which is exclusively vested in Congress."

== Dove and olive branch ==
=== Christianity ===
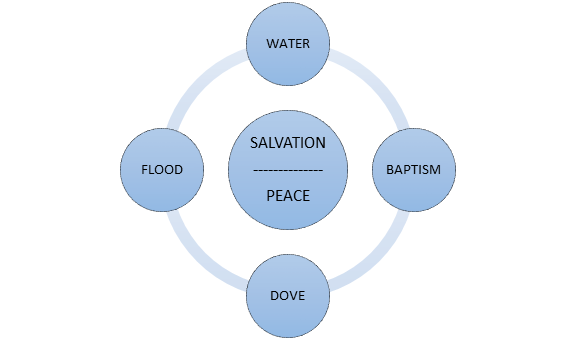
Diagram showing the relationship between the Flood, baptism, water, peace and the dove in early Christian thinking

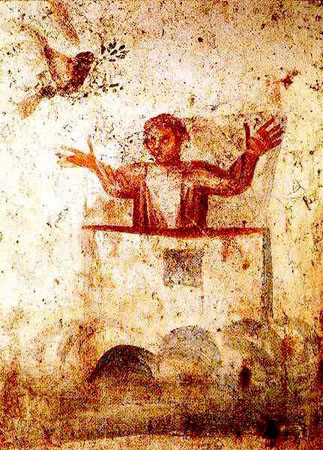
Wall painting from the early Christian Catacombs of Marcellinus and Peter in Rome, showing Noah, in the orante attitude of prayer, the dove and an olive branch

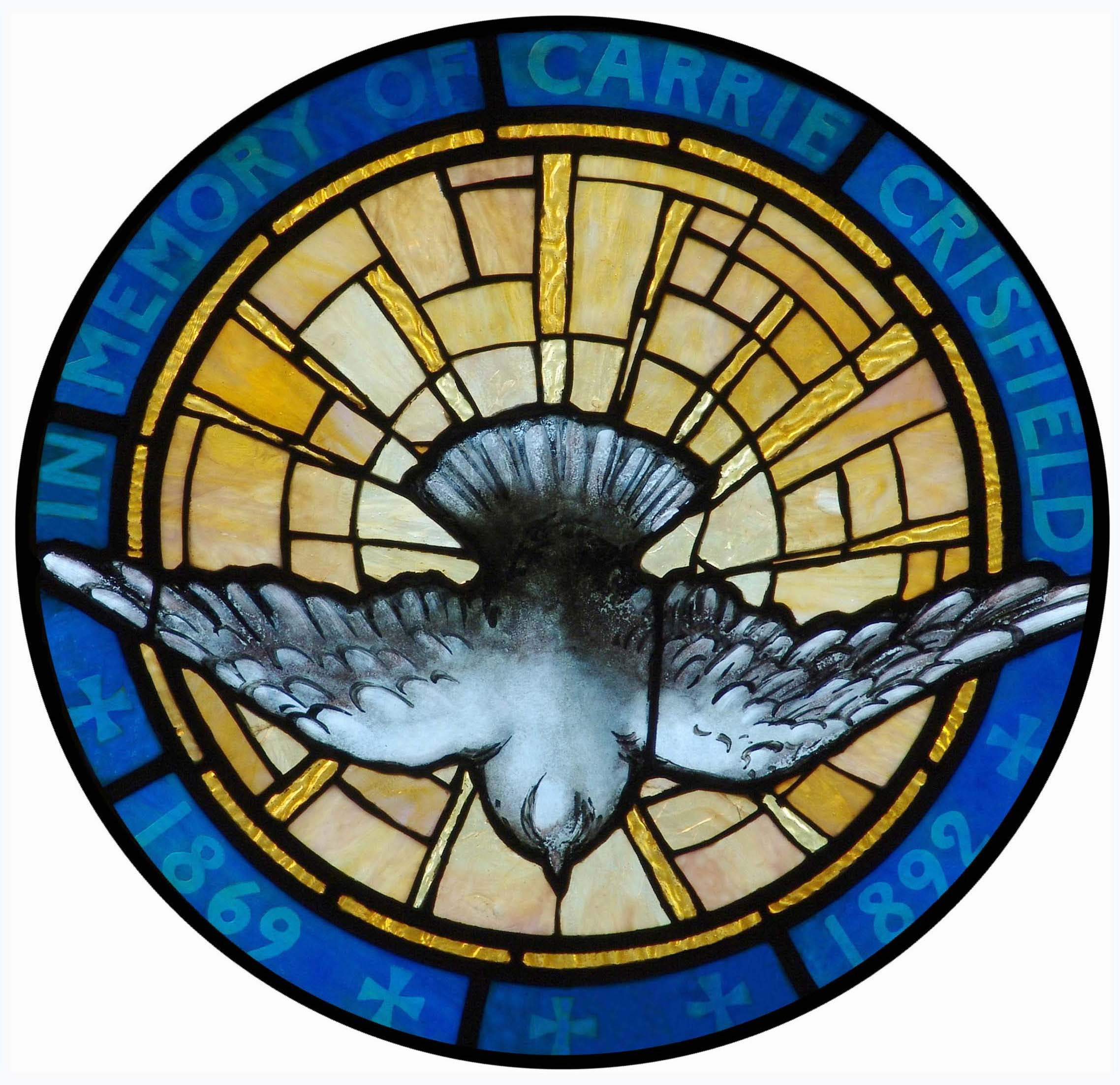
The descent of Holy Spirit in the Christian Trinity depicted as a dove of peace in a church memorial stained glass window

The use of a dove as a symbol of peace originated with early Christians, who portrayed baptism accompanied by a dove, often on their sepulchres.

The New Testament compared the dove to the Spirit of God that descended on Jesus during his baptism. Christians saw similarities between baptism and Noah's Flood. The First Epistle of Peter (composed around the end of the first century AD) said that the Flood, which brought salvation through water, prefigured baptism. Tertullian (c. 160 – c. 220) compared the dove, who "announced to the world the assuagement of divine wrath, when she had been sent out of the ark and returned with the olive branch, to the Holy Spirit who descends in baptism in the form of a dove that brings the peace of God, sent out from the heavens".

At first the dove represented the subjective personal experience of peace, the peace of the soul, and in the earliest Christian art it accompanies representations of baptism. By the end of the second century (for example in the writing of Tertullian) it also represented social and political peace, "peace unto the nations", and from the third century it began to appear in depictions of conflict, such as Noah and the Ark, Daniel and the lions, the three young men in the furnace, and Susannah and the Elders.

The dove appears in Christian inscriptions in the Roman catacombs, sometimes accompanied by the words in pace (Latin for in peace). For example, in the Catacomb of Callixtus, a dove and branch are drawn next to a Latin inscription NICELLA VIRCO DEI OVE VI XIT ANNOS P M XXXV DE POSITA XV KAL MAIAS BENE MERENTI IN PACE, meaning 'Nicella, God's virgin, who lived for more or less 35 years. She was placed [here] 15 days before the Kalends of May [17 April]. For the well deserving one in peace.' In another example, a shallow relief sculpture shows a dove with a branch flying to a figure marked in Greek as ΕΙΡΗΝΗ (Eirene, or 'Peace'). The symbol has also been found in the Christian catacombs of Sousse, Tunisia (ancient Carthage), which date from the end of the first century AD.

The Christian symbolism of the olive branch, invariably carried by the dove, derives from Greek usage and the story of Noah in the Hebrew Bible. The story of Noah ends with a dove bringing a freshly plucked olive leaf (Hebrew: עלה זית alay zayit), a sign of life after the Flood and of God's bringing Noah, his family and the animals to land. Rabbinic literature interpreted the olive leaf as "the young shoots of the Land of Israel" or the dove's preference for bitter food in God's service, rather than sweet food in the service of men. Neither represented peace in Jewish thought, but the dove and olive branch acquired that meaning in Christianity.

Before the Peace of Constantine (313 AD), in which Rome ceased its persecution of Christians following Constantine's conversion, Noah was normally shown in an attitude of prayer, a dove flying toward him or alighting on his outstretched hand. According to Graydon Snyder, "The Noah story afforded the early Christian community an opportunity to express piety and peace in a vessel that withstood the threatening environment" of Roman persecution. According to Ludwig Budde and Pierre Prigent, the dove referred to the descending of the Holy Spirit rather than the peace associated with Noah. After the Peace of Constantine, when persecution ceased, Noah appeared less frequently in Christian art.

In the fourth century, St. Jerome's Latin Bible translated the Hebrew alay zayit in the Noah story as ramum olivae, ('olive branch'), possibly reflecting the Christian equivalence between the peace brought by baptism and peace brought by the ending of the Flood. By the fifth century, St Augustine confirmed the Christian adoption of the olive branch as a symbol of peace, writing that, "perpetual peace is indicated by the olive branch (Latin: oleae ramusculo) that the dove brought with it when it returned to the ark."

Medieval illuminated manuscripts, such as the Holkham Bible, showed the dove returning to Noah with a branch. Wycliffe's Bible, which translated the Vulgate into English in the 14th century, uses "a braunche of olyue tre with greene leeuys" ("a branch of olive tree with green leaves") in Gen. 8:11. In the Middle Ages, some Jewish manuscripts, which were often illustrated by Christians, also showed Noah's dove with an olive branch, for example, the Golden Haggadah (about 1420).

English Bibles from the 17th-century King James Bible onwards, which translated the story of Noah direct from Hebrew, render the Hebrew aleh zayit as 'olive leaf' rather than 'olive branch', but by this time the association of the dove with an olive branch as a symbol of peace in the story of Noah was firmly established.

=== Secular representations ===
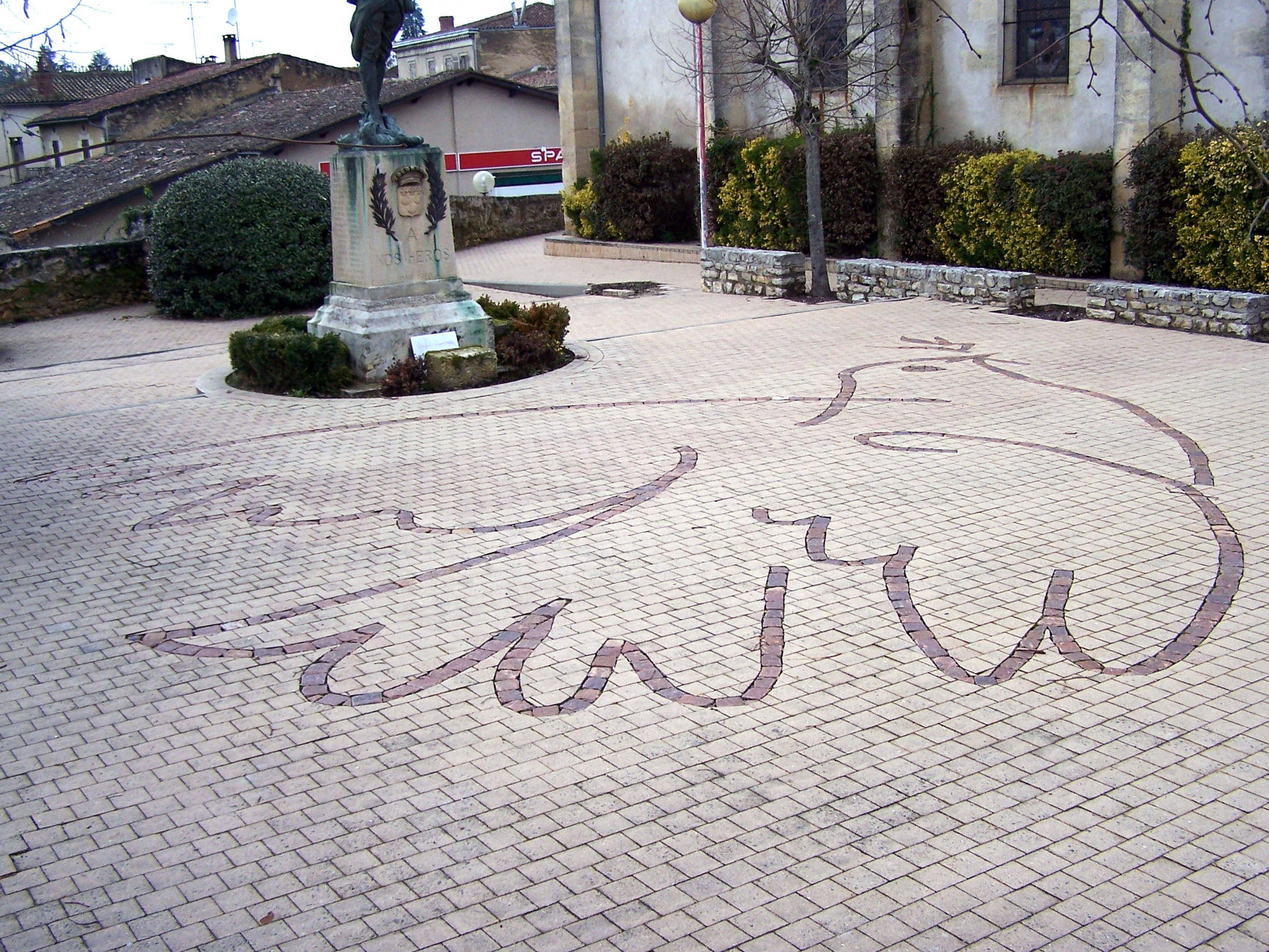
Adaption of Picasso's La Colombe

- Late 15th century In the late 15th century, a dove with an olive branch was used on the seal of Dieci di Balia, the Florentine committee known as The Ten of Liberty and Peace, whose secretary was Machiavelli; it bore the motto Pax et Defencio Libertatis (Peace and the Defence of Liberty).
- Late 18th century In 18th-century America, a £2 note of North Carolina (1771) depicted the dove and olive with a motto meaning: "Peace restored". Georgia's $40 note of 1778 portrayed the dove and olive and a hand holding a dagger, with a motto meaning "Either war or peace, prepared for both."
- Early 19th century The Society for the Promotion of Permanent and Universal Peace, also known as The London Peace Society, formed on a Quaker initiative in 1816, used the symbol of a dove and olive branch.
- Early 20th century A German war loan poster of 1917 showed the head of an eagle over a dove of peace in flight, with the text, "Subscribe to the War Loan".
- Mid-20th century Picasso's lithograph, La Colombe (The Dove), a traditional, realistic picture of a pigeon, without an olive branch, was chosen as the emblem for the World Peace Council in Paris in April 1949. The dove became a symbol for the peace movement and the ideals of the Communist Party and was used in Communist demonstrations of the period. At the 1950 World Peace Council in Sheffield, Picasso said that his father had taught him to paint doves, concluding, "I stand for life against death; I stand for peace against war." At the 1952 World Peace Council in Berlin, Picasso's Dove was depicted in a banner above the stage. The dove symbol was used extensively in the post-war peace movement. Anti-communists had their own take on the peace dove: the group Paix et Liberté distributed posters titled La colombe qui fait BOUM ('the dove that goes BOOM'), showing the peace dove metamorphosing into a Soviet tank.

== The broken rifle ==
The broken rifle symbol of War Resisters' International

The broken rifle is a symbol that represents an absolute rejection of violence. Used by War Resisters' International (WRI) and its affiliates but predates the foundation of WRI in 1921. The first known example of the symbol is in the masthead of the January 1909 issue of De Wapens Neder (Down with Weapons), the monthly paper of the International Antimilitarist Union in the Netherlands. In 1915 it appeared on the cover of a pamphlet, Under det brukne Gevær (Under the Broken Rifle), published by the Norwegian Social Democratic Youth Association. The (German) League for War Victims, founded in 1917, used the broken rifle on a 1919 banner.

In 1921, Belgian workers marching through La Louvrière on 16 October 1921, carried flags showing a soldier breaking his rifle. Ernst Friedrich, a German who had refused military service, founded the Anti-Kriegs Museum in Berlin, which featured a bas-relief broken rifle over the door. The museum distributed broken-rifle badges, girls' and women's brooches, boys' belt buckles, and men's tie pins. However the logo has many versions, including broken assault rifles, bombs, and missiles. The variations along with the original have been put on T-shirts, baseball caps, cars, posters, glass windows, and has been the choice for many tattoos in todays age.

== White poppy ==
In 1933, during a period in which there was widespread fear of war in Europe, the Women's Co-operative Guild began the practice of distributing white poppies as an alternative to the red poppies distributed by the Royal British Legion in commemoration of servicemen who died in the First World War. In 1934 the newly formed Peace Pledge Union (PPU), which was the largest British peace organization in the inter-war years, joined in distributing white poppies and laying white poppy wreaths "as a pledge to peace that war must not happen again". In 1980, the PPU revived the symbol as a way of remembering the victims of war without glorifying militarism.

== Roerich's peace banner ==
The Pax Cultura emblem of the Roerich Pact or Treaty on the Protection of Artistic and Scientific Institutions and Historic Monuments of 1935

Nicholas Roerich (1874–1947), a Russian artist, cultural activist, and philosopher, founded a movement to protect cultural artifacts. Its symbol was a maroon-on-white emblem consisting of three solid circles in a surrounding circle. It has also been used as a peace banner. In 1935 a pact initiated by Roerich was signed by the United States and Latin American nations, agreeing that "historic monuments, museums, scientific, artistic, educational and cultural institutions" should be protected both in times of peace and war.

According to the Roerich Museum,

The Banner of Peace symbol has ancient origins. Perhaps its earliest known example appears on Stone Age amulets: three dots, without the enclosing circle. Roerich came across numerous later examples in various parts of the world, and knew that it represented a deep and sophisticated understanding of the triune nature of existence. But for the purposes of the Banner and the Pact, Roerich described the circle as representing the totality of culture, with the three dots being Art, Science, and Religion, three of the most embracing of human cultural activities. He also described the circle as representing the eternity of time, encompassing the past, present, and future. The sacred origins of the symbol, as an illustration of the trinities fundamental to all religions, remain central to the meaning of the Pact and the Banner today.

== Peace symbol ==
☮o

Peace symbol
- In Unicode: U+262E ☮ PEACE SYMBOL

Different from
- Different from: Mercedes-Benz logo

Related
- See also: U+1F54A 🕊 DOVE OF PEACE; U+270C ✌ VICTORY HAND

The symbol now known internationally as the "peace symbol" or "peace sign", was created in 1958 as a symbol for Britain's campaign for nuclear disarmament. It went on to be widely adopted in the American anti-war movement in the 1960s and was re-interpreted as generically representing world peace. It was also used by activists opposing nuclear power in the 1980s, although the Smiling Sun image ["Nuclear power? No thanks!"] predominated.

=== Origin ===
The symbol was designed by Gerald Holtom (1914–1985), who presented it to Direct Action Committee on 21 February 1958. It was "immediately accepted" as a symbol for the movement and used for a march from Trafalgar Square, London, to the Atomic Weapons Research Establishment at Aldermaston in Berkshire on 4 April. Holtom's design was adapted by Eric Austen (1922–1999) to ceramic lapel badges. The original design is in the Peace Museum in Bradford, England.

Flag semaphore "ND"

N

D

The symbol is a super-imposition of the flag semaphore for the characters "N" and "D", taken to stand for "nuclear disarmament". This observation was made as early as 5 April 1958 in the Manchester Guardian. In addition to this primary genesis, Holtom additionally cited as inspiration Francisco Goya's painting The Third of May 1808 : (Note: in the painting, the peasant shown has his arms stretched upwards, not downwards.)

I was in despair. Deep despair. I drew myself: the representative of an individual in despair, with hands palm outstretched outwards and downwards in the manner of Goya's peasant before the firing squad. I formalised the drawing into a line and put a circle round it.

Ken Kolsbun, a correspondent of Holtom's, says that the designer came to regret the symbolism of despair, as he felt that peace was something to be celebrated and wanted the symbol to be inverted. Eric Austen is said to have "discovered that the 'gesture of despair' motif had long been associated with 'the death of man', and the circle with 'the unborn child'".

The symbol became the badge of the Campaign for Nuclear Disarmament, and wearing it became a sign of support for the campaign that argued for British unilateral nuclear disarmament. An account of CND's early history described the image as "a visual adhesive to bind the [Aldermaston] March and later the whole Campaign together ... probably the most powerful, memorable and adaptable image ever designed for a secular cause".

In the early 1960s, Holtom's design was simplified by Campaign for Nuclear Disarmament logo designer Ken Garland (1929–2021), who removed the wedges from the lines inside the circle and turned it into a single-weight line drawing. Garland's logo had an increased legibility and became the version of the symbol widely copied around the world.

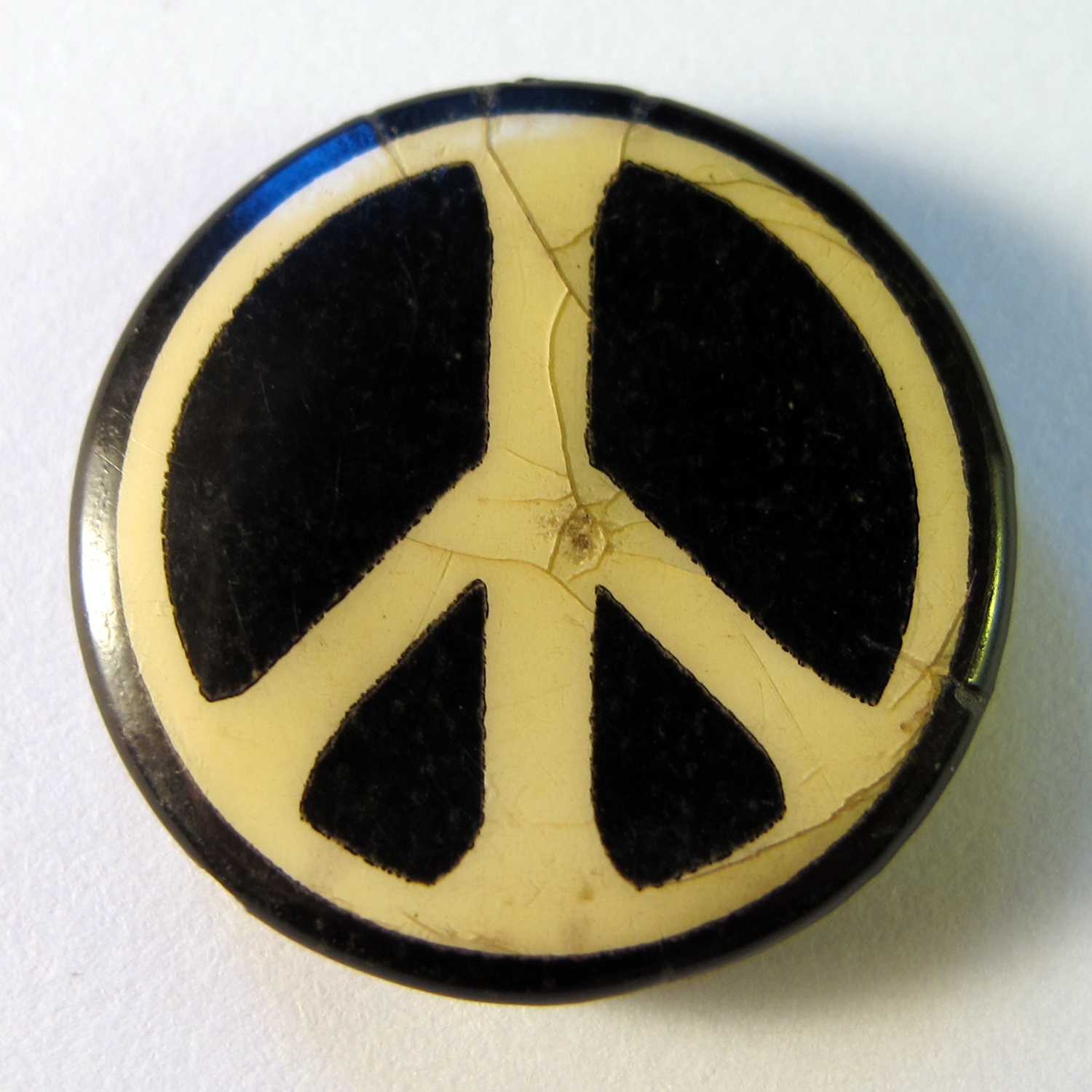
Campaign for Nuclear Disarmament badge (1960s)

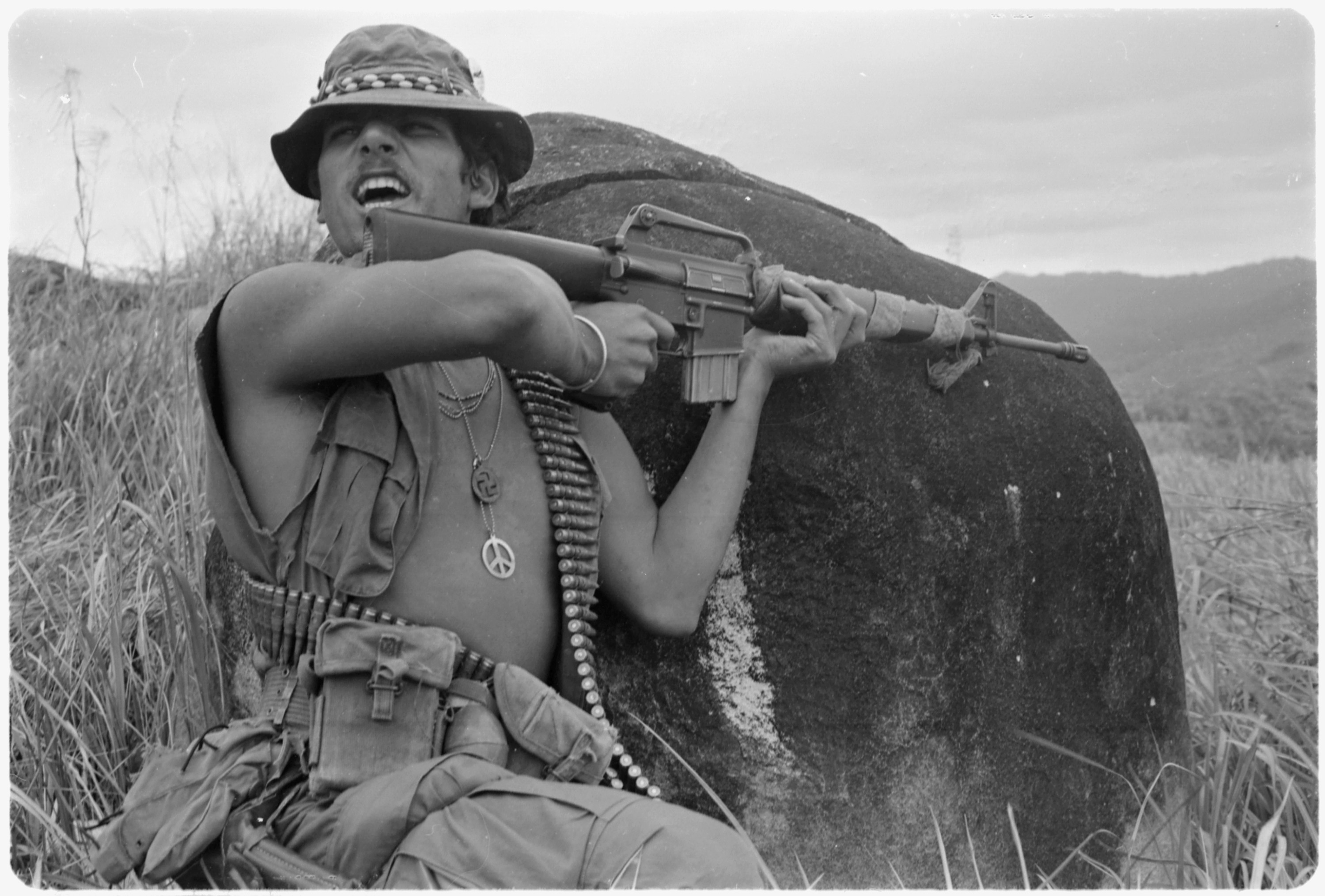
A U.S. soldier in Vietnam wearing various amulets, including the "peace symbol" and the Buddhist swastika (1971 photograph)

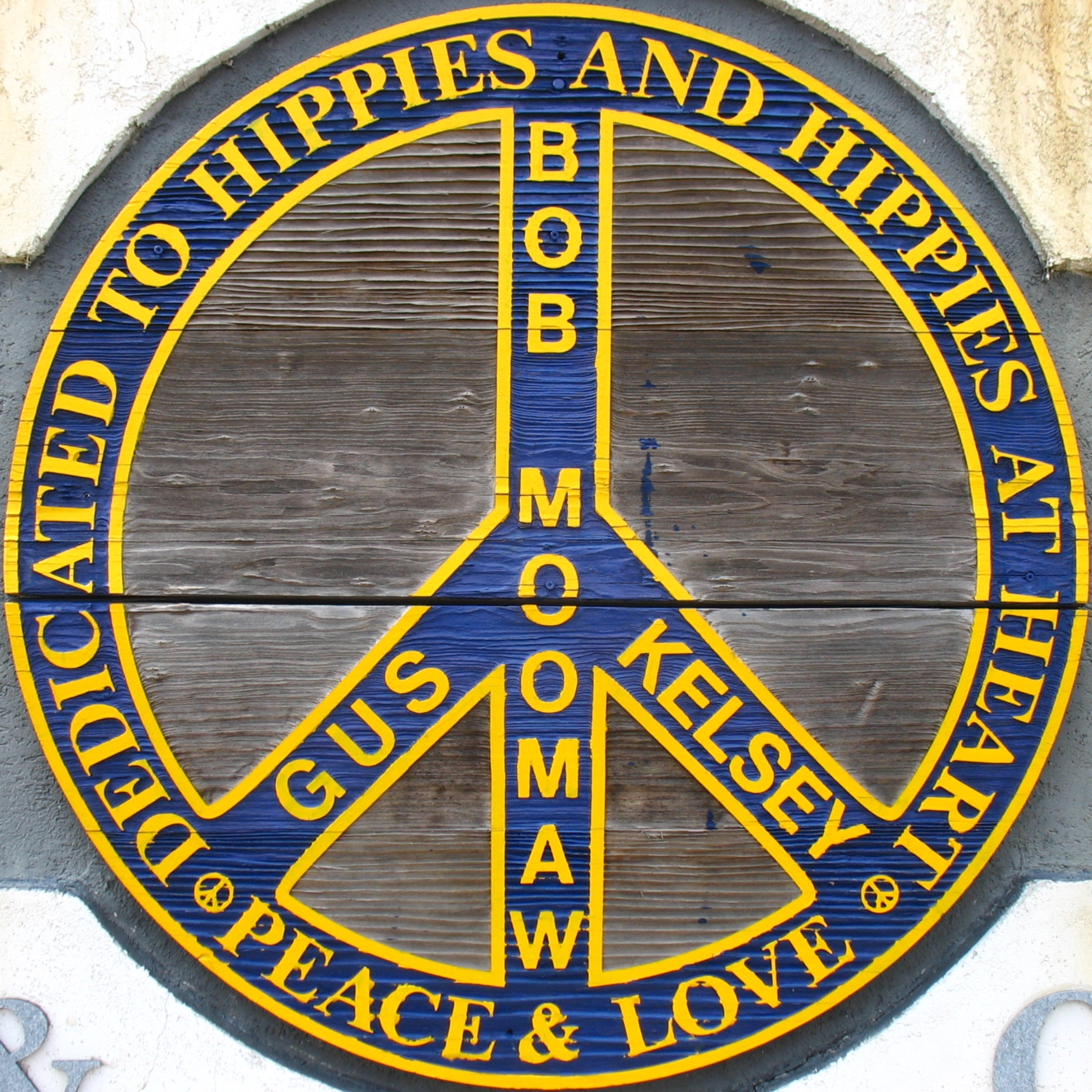
A "peace symbol" forming part of the "Hippie Memorial" (1992) in Arcola, Illinois, United States

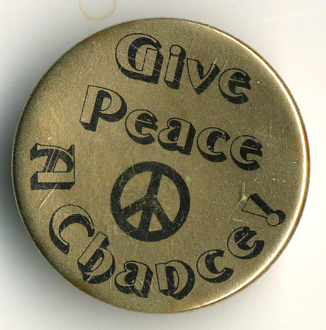
A "Give Peace a Chance" pin, likely a reference to the 1969 John Lennon song

=== International reception ===
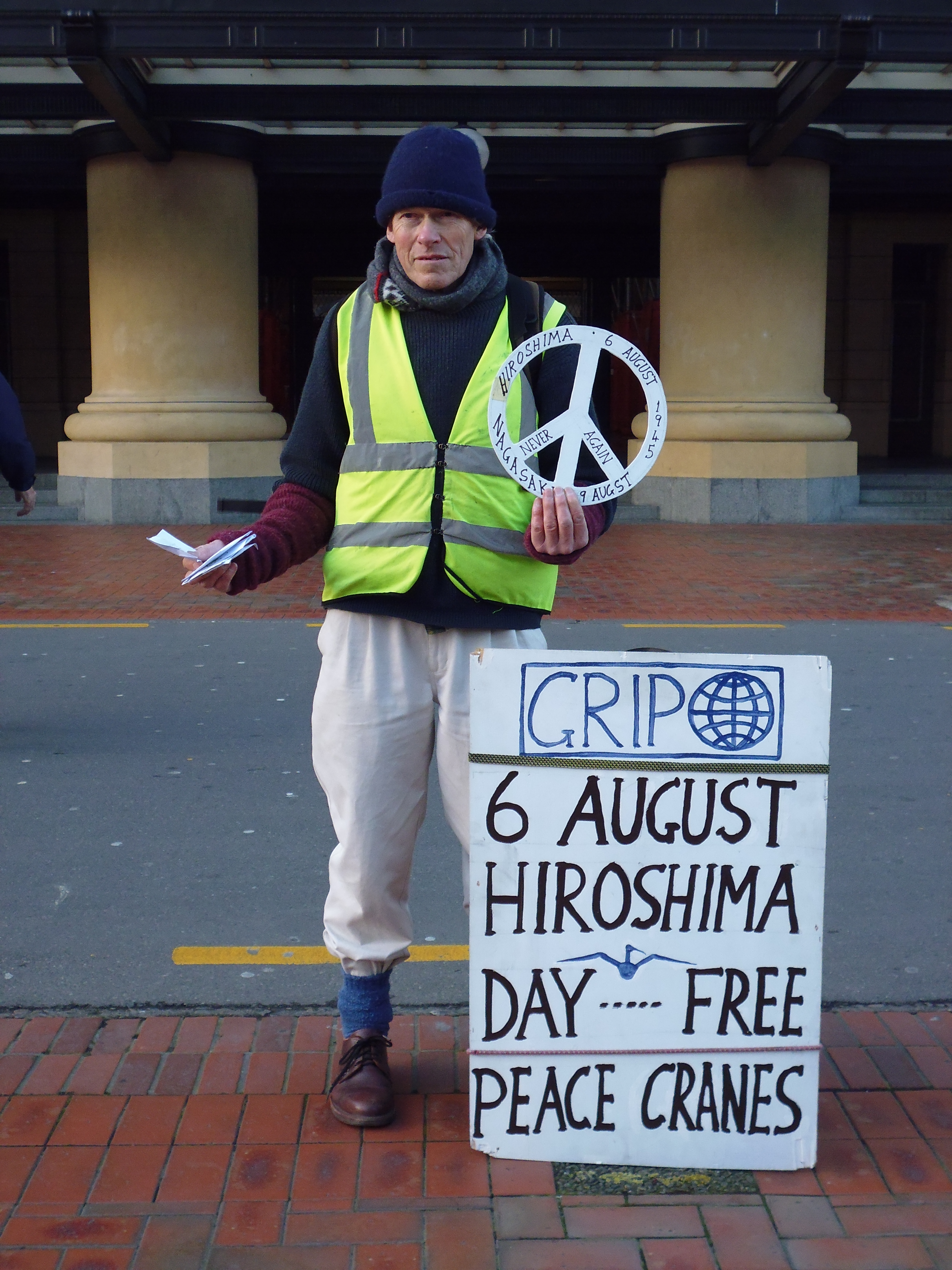
Nuclear disarmament activist in Wellington handing out peace cranes and holding a peace symbol commemorating the atomic bombings of Hiroshima and Nagasaki (6 August 2014)

Not copyrighted, trademarked or restricted, the symbol spread beyond CND and was adopted by the wider disarmament and anti-war movements. It became widely known in the United States in 1958 when Albert Bigelow, a pacifist protester, sailed a small boat fitted with the CND banner into the vicinity of a nuclear test. Buttons with the symbol were imported into the United States in 1960 by Philip Altbach, a freshman at the University of Chicago. Altbach had traveled to England to meet with British peace groups as a delegate from the Student Peace Union (SPU) and, on his return, he persuaded the SPU to adopt the symbol.

Between 1960 and 1964, they sold thousands of the buttons on college campuses. By 1968, the symbol had been adopted as a generic peace sign, associated especially with the hippie movement and opposition to the Vietnam War.

In 1970, two US private companies tried to register the peace symbol as a trade mark: the Intercontinental Shoe Corporation of New York and Luv, Inc. of Miami. Commissioner of Patents William E. Schuyler Jr, said that the symbol "could not properly function as a trade mark subject to registration by the Patent Office".

In 1973, the South African government tried to ban its use by opponents of apartheid.

=== Interpretations ===
Gerald Holtom had originally considered using a Christian cross symbol within a circle, but he was dissuaded by several priests who expressed reservations towards using the cross on a protest march. Holtom's symbol was nevertheless compared to the Christian cross symbol, as well as to the death rune (the inverted ᛘ rune associated with death in early 20th century esotericism).

In 1968, the anti-Communist evangelist Billy James Hargis described the symbol as a "broken cross", which he claimed represented the antichrist. Hargis' interpretation was taken up by a member of the John Birch Society, Marjorie Jensen, who wrote a pamphlet claiming the symbol was equivalent to "a symbol of the devil, with the cross reversed and broken" supposedly known as "the crow's foot or witch's foot". In June 1970, American Opinion, the journal of the John Birch Society, published an article which compared the symbol to a supposed "broken cross" claimed to have been "carried by the Moors when they invaded Spain in the 8th century". The newsletter of the National Republican Congressional Committee of 28 September 1970 on its question page made the comparison to a design of a "death rune" in a wreath published by the German Nazi party as representing (heroic) death, in 1942. Time magazine in its 2 November 1970 issue made note of these comparisons, pointing out that any such resemblance was "probably coincidental".

== Rainbow flag ==
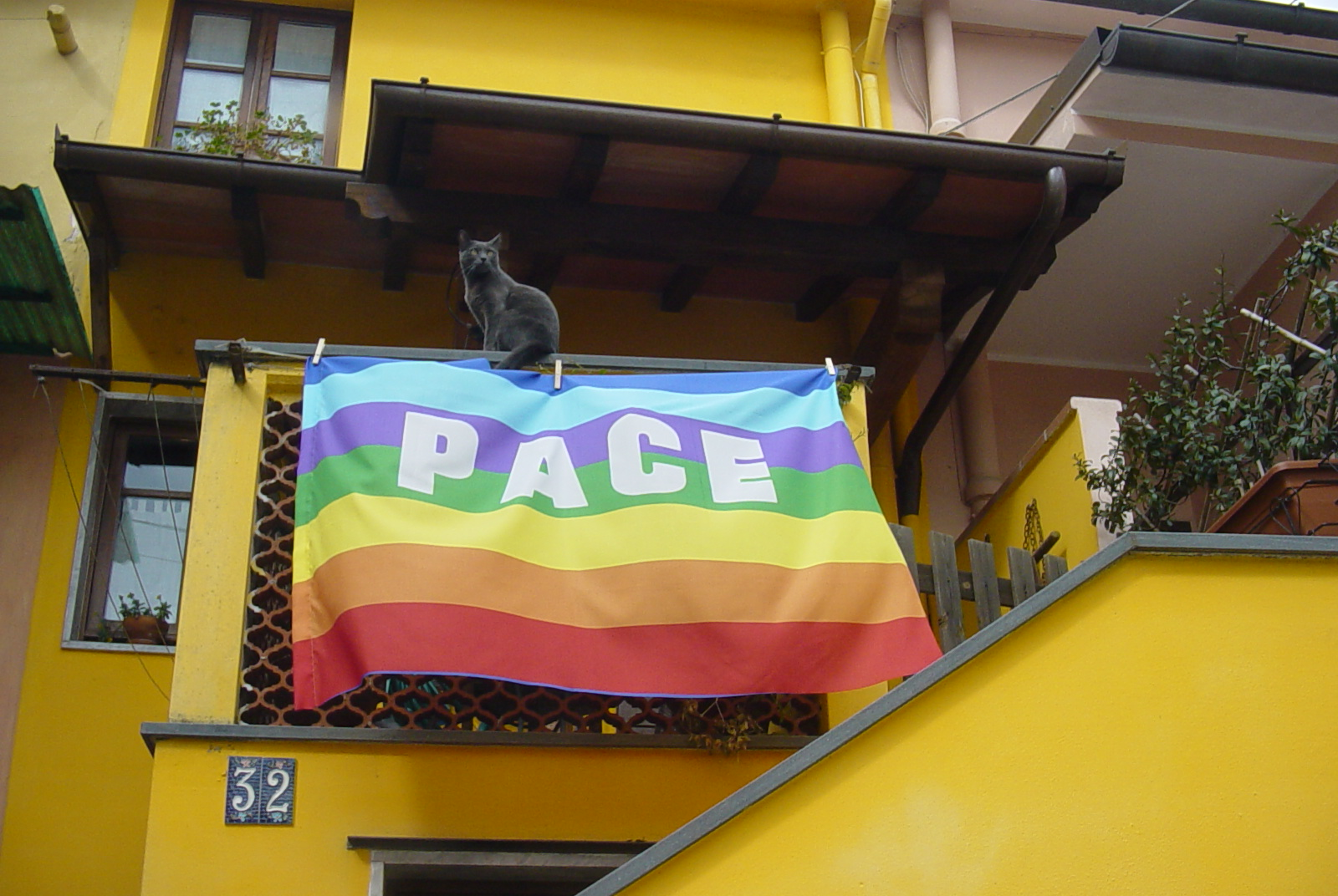
The peace flag flown from a balcony in Italy

The international peace flag in the colours of the rainbow was first used in Italy on a 1961 peace march from Perugia to Assisi organized by the pacifist and social philosopher Aldo Capitini (1899–1968). Inspired by the peace flags used on British peace marches, Capitini got some women of Perugia hurriedly to sew together coloured strips of material. The march has been repeated many times since 1961, including in 2010. The original flag was kept by Capitini's collaborator, Lanfranco Mencaroni, at Collevalenza, near Todi. In 2011, plans were announced to transfer it to the Palazzo dei Priori in Perugia.

The flag commonly has seven rainbow-colored stripes with the word PACE (Italian for 'peace') in the center. It has been explained as follows:

In the account of the Great Flood, God set the rainbow to a seal the alliance with man and nature, promising that there will never be another Flood. The rainbow thus became a symbol of Peace across the earth and the sky, and, by extension, among all men.

The flag usually has the colours violet, indigo, blue, green, yellow, orange and red from top to bottom, but some have the violet stripe below the blue one (as in the picture at the right) or a white one at the top. A picture of Capitini's first peace flag, carried by Anna Capitini and Silvana Mencaroni, shows the colours red, orange, white, green, violet, indigo, and lavender.

In 2002, renewed display of the flag was widespread with the Pace da tutti i balconi ('Peace from every balcony') campaign, a protest against the impending war in Iraq planned by the United States and its allies. In 2003, the Italian newspaper Corriere della Sera reported leading advertising executives saying that the peace flag had become more popular than the Italian national flag. In November 2009, a huge peace flag, 21m wide by 40m long, was made in Lecce, Salento, by young members of "GPACE – Youth for Peace – Give Peace a Chance Everywhere".

== Predator and prey lie down together ==
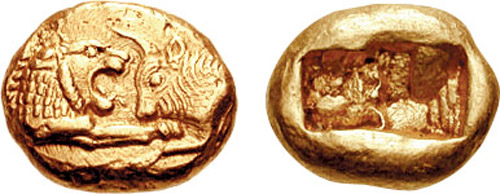
Croeseid coin of Croesus c. 550 BC, depicting the Lion and Bull – partly symbolizing alliance between Lydia and Greece, respectively

The imagery of a predator and prey lying down together in peace is depicted in the Bible:

The wolf will live with the lamb, the leopard will lie down with the goat, the calf and the lion and the yearling together; and a little child will lead them.

— Isaiah 11:6

One of the first coins to be minted was the croeseid. It depicted the Lydian Lion and Hellenic Bull, representing the peaceful alliance between Croesus and the dynasty of Agamemnon enthroned in Cyme. This alliance had been sealed through two royal marriages, Hermodike I c. 800 BC to the Phrygian king Midas and Hermodike II c. 600 BC to Alyattes of Lydia. Alyattes was Croesus' father and Hermodike II was likely his mother. When he came to power, Croesus minted the first coin depicting two animals. The roaring lion – symbol of Lydia – and the bull – symbol of Hellenic Zeus (from the Seduction of Europa) – are facing each other in truce. (Note: Hunting lions attack from the rear, not face-to the horns.) The imagery of a predator and prey lying down together in peace is reflected in other ancient literature, e.g. "...the calf and the lion and the yearling together..." c. 700 BC (Isaiah 11:6, see above). The croeseid symbolism of peace between the Greeks of Asia Minor, Lydians and later Persians (under Cyrus the Great) persisted long after Croesus' death – until Darius the Great introduced new coins c. 500 BC.

The union of Phrygia and Lydia with Aeolian Greeks resulted in regional peace, which facilitated the transfer of ground-breaking technological skills into Ancient Greece; respectively, the phonetic written script and the minting of coinage (to use a token currency, where the value is guaranteed by the state). Both inventions were rapidly adopted by surrounding nations through further trade and cooperation and have been of fundamental benefit to the progress of civilization.

== V sign ==
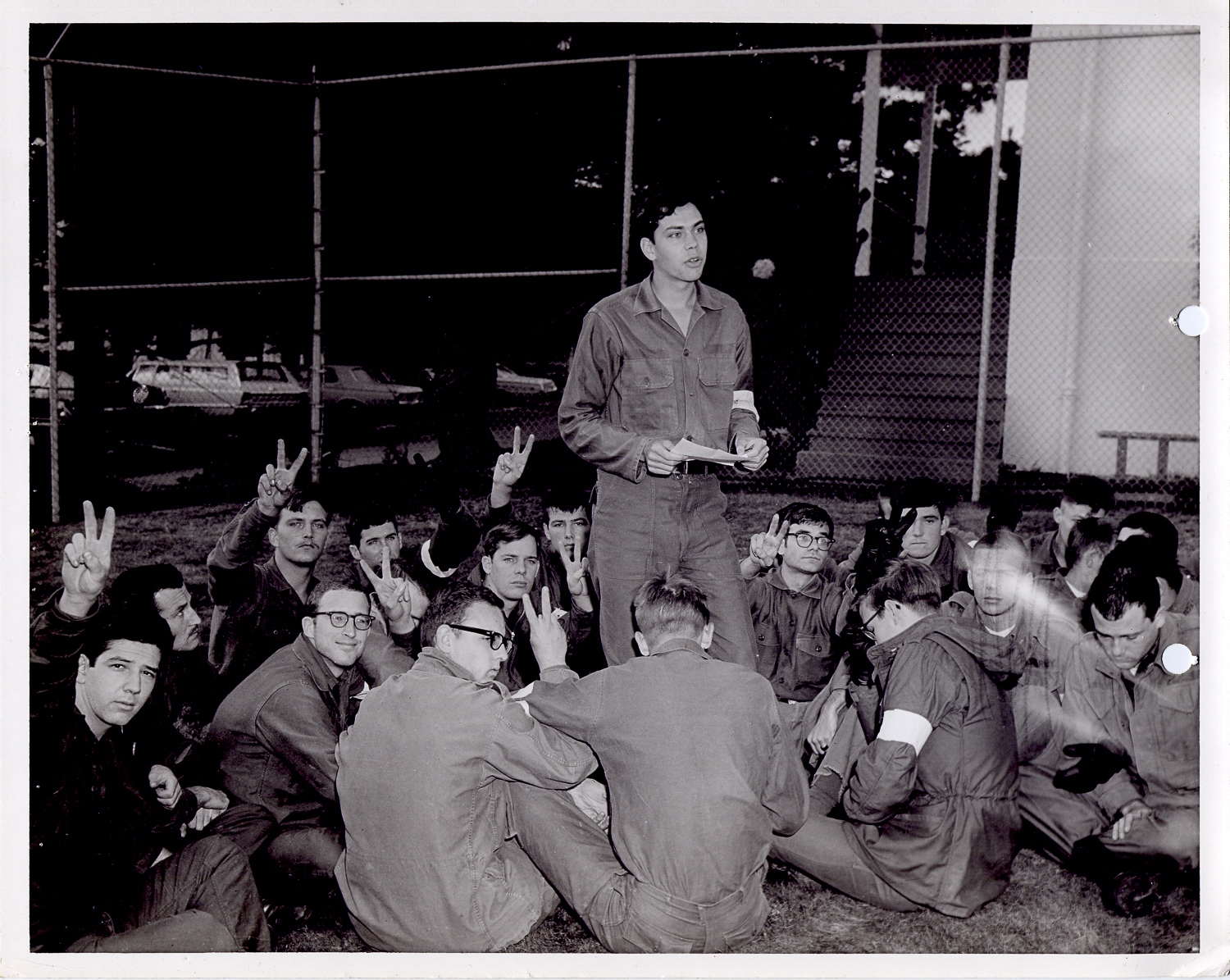
US soldiers protest the Vietnam war, 1968

The V sign (U+270C ✌ VICTORY HAND in Unicode) is a hand gesture, palm outwards, with the index and middle fingers open and all others closed. It had been used to represent victory during the Second World War. During the 1960s in the US, activists against the Vietnam War and in subsequent anti-war protests adopted the gesture as a sign of peace.

== Paper cranes ==
The crane, a traditional symbol of luck in Japan, was popularized as a peace symbol by the story of Sadako Sasaki (1943–1955), a girl who died as a result of the atomic bomb exploding over Hiroshima in 1945. According to the story, popularized through the book Sadako and the Thousand Paper Cranes, in the last stages of her illness she started folding paper cranes, inspired by the Japanese saying that one who folded a thousand origami cranes was granted a wish. This made an impression in people's minds. As a result, she is remembered on every 6 August, which is an annual peace day for people all over Japan.

Origami paper crane as a peace symbol

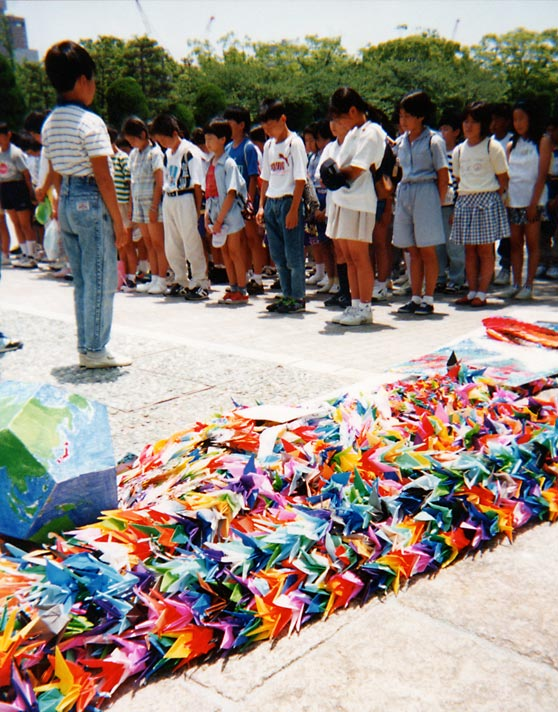
Japanese school children dedicate Senbazuru (千羽鶴), or 1000 cranes, to the memorial for Sadako Sasaki in Hiroshima Peace Park, 1990.

== Japanese Peace Bell ==
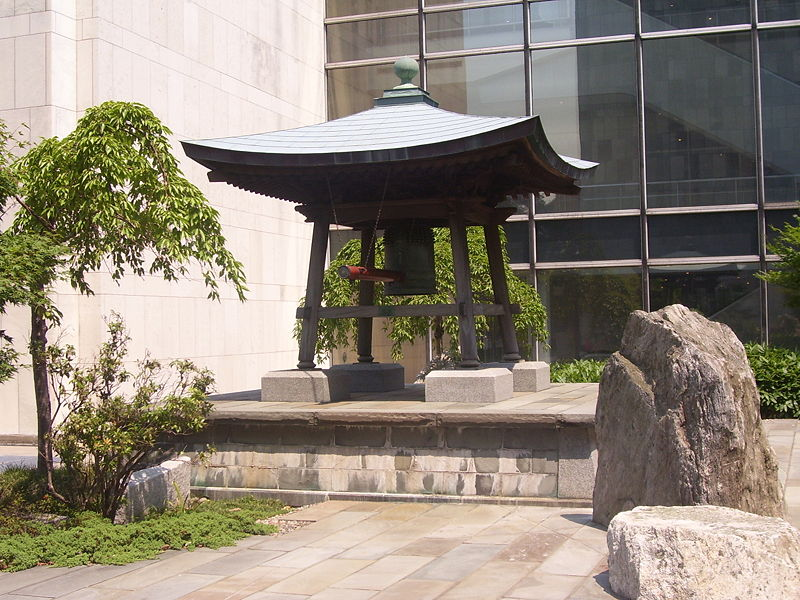
The Japanese Peace Bell

The Japanese Peace Bell is a United Nations peace symbol. Cast on 24 November 1952, it was an official gift of the Japanese people to the United Nations on 8 June 1954. The symbolic bell of peace was donated by Japan to the United Nations at a time when Japan had not yet been officially admitted to the United Nations. The Japanese Peace Bell was presented to the United Nations by the United Nations Association of Japan.

== Shalom/salaam ==
A wordmark of the three words, Hebrew word shalom (Hebrew: שָׁלוֹם), together with the Arabic salaam (Arabic: سلام) and the English word peace has been used as a peace symbol in the Middle East. Shalom and salaam mean 'peace' and are cognates of each other, derived from the Semitic triconsonantal of S-L-M (realized in Hebrew as Š-L-M and in Arabic as S-L-M). The symbol has come to represent peace in the Middle East and an end to the Arab–Israeli conflict. Wall plaques, signs, T-shirts, and buttons are sold with only those words.

== See also ==
- Earth anthems, songs celebrating or eulogizing the world
- Green ribbon, Russian anti-war symbol
- List of anti-war songs
- Nonviolence
- White-blue-white flag, Russian anti-war flag
