= CK =

CK, Ck, or ck may refer to:

== Science and technology ==
- Conductive keratoplasty, a type of refractive surgery
- Creatine kinase, an enzyme
- Cytokinin, a plant hormone
- Cytokeratin (CK1 to CK20), keratin proteins
- Cyanogen chloride, an inorganic chemical

=== Computing ===
- .ck, the Internet country code top-level domain for the Cook Islands
- Collective Knowledge (software), a framework for collaborative and reproducible research

== Organizations ==
- Calvin Klein (fashion house), a fashion company
- CH. Karnchang, a Thai contractor and construction firm
- Chowking, a Filipino fast food chain
- Colombo Kings, a team participating in Lanka Premier League
- CK Hutchison Holdings, a multinational conglomerate headquartered in Hong Kong
- Bloods, a US-based street gang, from the nickname "Crip Killer"
- Circle K, an international chain of convenience stores

== Transportation ==
- China Cargo Airlines (IATA code CK)
- Composite Corridor, a designation of British Rail carriages
- Chevrolet C/K, a model of pickup truck

== People ==
- Louis C.K. (born 1967), American comedian
- Con Kolivas, Australian anaesthetist

== Other uses ==
- ck (digraph), a letter combination used in spelling
- C-K theory (concept-knowledge theory), in design
- CK (album), a 1988 album by Chaka Khan
- Civilinis kodeksas, the Code of Lithuania
- Cranbrook Kingswood, a school in the US

== See also ==
- CAK (disambiguation)
- KC (disambiguation)
