= Panic (Alexei Sayle album) =

Studio album by Alexei Sayle
- Released: 1985
- Recorded: 1985
- Genres: Funk, rock, comedy, new wave
- Label: CBS
- Producer: Chaz Jankel

Alexei Sayle chronology
The Fish People Tapes (1984)	Panic (1985)

Singles from Panic
- 1. "Didn't You Kill My Brother?" Released: February 1985; 2. "Meanwhile" Released: November 1985

Panic is Alexei Sayle's third album, released in 1985. This was his final album; he would later record some audiobooks in the late 1990s.

Panic spawned the singles "Didn't You Kill My Brother?" and "Meanwhile". The former was later featured in The Comic Strip Presents 1988 film of the same name written by Sayle. "Didn't You Kill My Brother?" is also a phrase Sayle has used often in his works, such as in an episode of The Young Ones.

Shortened, re-recorded versions of the songs "Panic", "Word Association", and "Play That Funky Music Jewish Boy" would later appear as comedic music videos in certain episodes of Alexei Sayle's Stuff.

A 12-inch acetate exists of a 7-minute extended version of "Play That Funky Music Jewish Boy", which suggests that there was a third single planned from this album.

== Track listing ==
All lyrics are written by Alexei Sayle.

Side 1
No.	Title	Length
1.	"Meanwhile"	4:02
2.	"Panic"	5:00
3.	"Story of Little Woo"	0:22
4.	"Play That Funky Music Jewish Boy"	5:35
5.	"Romford Bypass"	4:16

Side 2
No.	Title	Length
1.	"Didn't You Kill My Brother?"	4:41
2.	"Further Story of Little Woo"	0:33
3.	"Word Association"	4:40
4.	"Further Further Story of Little Woo"	0:24
5.	"Do Dis Do Dat"	2:43
6.	"Gospel"	1:28

== Charts ==
Chart (1986)	Peak position
Australia (Kent Music Report)	99
Canada (RPM)	95

== Personnel ==
=== Performers ===
- Alexei Sayle - vocals
- Tessa Niles - backing vocals (on 1; 4); vocals on "Word Association"
- Tim Sanders - tenor saxophone
- Simon Clarke - alto saxophone
- Luke Tunney - trumpet
- Mark King - bass on "Play That Funky Music Jewish Boy"

=== Production and photography ===
- Chaz Jankel - production, guitar, bass, synth, piano, programming
- Philip Bagenal - production
- Don Frazer - production on "Do Dis Do Dat"
- Ian McTavish - production on "Do Dis Do Dat"
- Eric Watson - photography
