= Alexei Sayle's Imaginary Sandwich Bar =

British radio series

- Genre: Comedy
- Running time: 30 minutes
- Country of origin: United Kingdom
- Language(s): English
- Home station: BBC Radio 4
- Written by: Alexei Sayle
- Produced by: Joe Nunnery
- Original release: 22 November 2016
- No. of series: 5
- No. of episodes: 20
- Website: https://www.bbc.co.uk/programmes/b09fb6n5

Alexei Sayle's Imaginary Sandwich Bar is a stand up and storytelling BBC Radio 4 show hosted and written by Alexei Sayle.

The show features Alexei delivering "a mixture of stand-up, memoir and philosophy from behind the counter of his imaginary sandwich bar". It has garnered critical acclaim, winning a BBC Audio Drama award in 2020.

The first episode aired in 2016, with 5 series having aired as of 2025.

A tie-in book was released in 2017.

== Episodes ==
=== Series 1 ===
Ep	Title	Original air date
1	Pretending and Sandwiches	15 November 2016
2	Political Beliefs	22 November 2016
3	Careerism	29 November 2016
4	History and the Role of the Entertainer	6 December 2016

=== Series 2 ===
Ep	Title	Original air date
1	Britain's Place in the World	9 November 2017
2	The Financial Crash	16 November 2017
3	Death and Travel	23 November 2017
4	La Vie Moral	30 November 2017

=== Series 3 ===
Ep	Title	Original air date
1	Corbyn and the Left	12 September 2019
2	Santa Claused Faced Old...	19 September 2019
3	Rage and Resentment	26 September 2019
4	Kings of Comedy	3 October 2019

=== Series 4 ===
Ep	Title	Original air date
1	A Monopoly of Violence	20 October 2022
2	The Revolving Door	27 October 2022
3	The Way We Live Now	3 November 2022
4	Repetition. Repetition. Repetition.	10 November 2022

=== Series 5 ===
Ep	Title	Original air date
1	The Sense of an Abrupt Ending	1 March 2025
2	What is this place you have brought me to Roger?	8 March 2025
3	Jumping the Shark	15 March 2025
4	Unsweet Charity	22 March 2025
