= CAK (disambiguation) =

CAK is the IATA code for Akron-Canton Airport, in Green, Ohio, USA.

Cak or CAK may also refer to:

- Cák, a Hungarian village
- Cak!, a comedy album by Alexei Sayle
- Cak (instrument), used in Indonesian Keroncong music
- Controlled Atmosphere Killing, animal slaughter by asphyxiation
- CDK-activating kinases
- Christian Academy of Knoxville
- CAK, the ICAO airline designator for Congo Air, Bahamas
- Kaqchikel language, identified by the IS 639 3 code cak
