= Alexei Sayle's Merry-Go-Round =

- Genre: Sketch comedy
- Written by: Alexei Sayle; Kevin Cecil; Dave Cummings; Kevin Gildea; Andy Riley; Jon Rowlands; Edgar Wright
- Directed by: Edgar Wright
- Starring: Alexei Sayle; Noel Fielding; Lee Hurst; Paul Putner; Gemma Rigg; Reece Shearsmith; Jessica Stevenson; David Walliams; Peter Serafinowicz
- Country of origin: United Kingdom
- Original language: English
- No. of series: 1
- No. of episodes: 6

Production
- Producer: Jon Rowlands
- Running time: 30 minutes

Original release
- Network: BBC2
- Release: May 1998 – June 1998

Related
- Alexei Sayle's Stuff; The All New Alexei Sayle Show

Alexei Sayle's Merry-Go-Round is a comedy sketch show which ran on BBC2 for a total of 6 episodes over one series in May and June 1998. Edgar Wright directed the series.

Alexei Sayle's Merry-Go-Round was almost identical in format to The All New Alexei Sayle Show except with yet another change of writers. This time they included Kevin Cecil, Dave Cummings, Kevin Gildea, Andy Riley and show director Edgar Wright.

Sketches included Noel Fielding, Omid Djalili, Lee Hurst, Paul Putner, Gemma Rigg, Reece Shearsmith, Jessica Stevenson, David Walliams and Peter Serafinowicz.

The continuing adventures of Bobby Chariot were chronicled. Now free from any obligation to be Alexei's warm-up man, he traversed a series of other career cul-de-sacs under the appalling management of the repulsive "Edna" (played by Denise Coffey). Meanwhile, Alexei Sayle himself was depicted as living in a Teletubbies-style burrow somewhere in the posh part of North London.

The show's theme song is a cover of "Merry-Go-Round" by Wild Man Fischer. This was the last television series Sayle made for the BBC.

== Reception ==
Karl French of Financial Times wrote, "The first instalment of Alexei Sayle's Merry-Go-Round is barely discernible from his previous programmes. But this is no bad thing and, as Ben Elton seems to have lost whatever it was he once had, Sayle is the remaining symbol of leftist 1980s TV humour. ... There is, as always, a sense of randomness to his humour, but among the failed items there are several inspired ideas, like Wrigley's bum-flavoured gum, The Ayatollah of Dibley, and further adventures of the great Bobby Chariot." The Sydney Morning Herald's Bruce Elder stated, "If your idea of a good laugh is a moon-faced balding man delivering great verbal sprays about the absurdities of the world, then this is for you."

The Times journalist Paul Hoggart praised the show, writing, "[H]e packs more material into one show than Ben Elton gets into a whole series. The atmosphere is fevered, the pace frantic, if a gag falls flat it doesn't matter because you are into the next one before you've realised that it wasn't very funny. But most of it is very funny. Sayle combines sharp, but eccentric observation with a magnificent surreal streak, all laced with genuine satirical venom." Uncut's Stephen Dalton said about the show, "Ranting skinhead turned observational surrealist offers a fresh selection of ill-fitting suits and post-Marxist quips".

== Sources ==
- The All New Alexei Sayle Show (1994) at IMDb
- Johnson RK, British TV Show Reviews
- "UK Comedy" on Memorable TV
