= Alexei Sayle =

English stand-up comedian (born 1952)

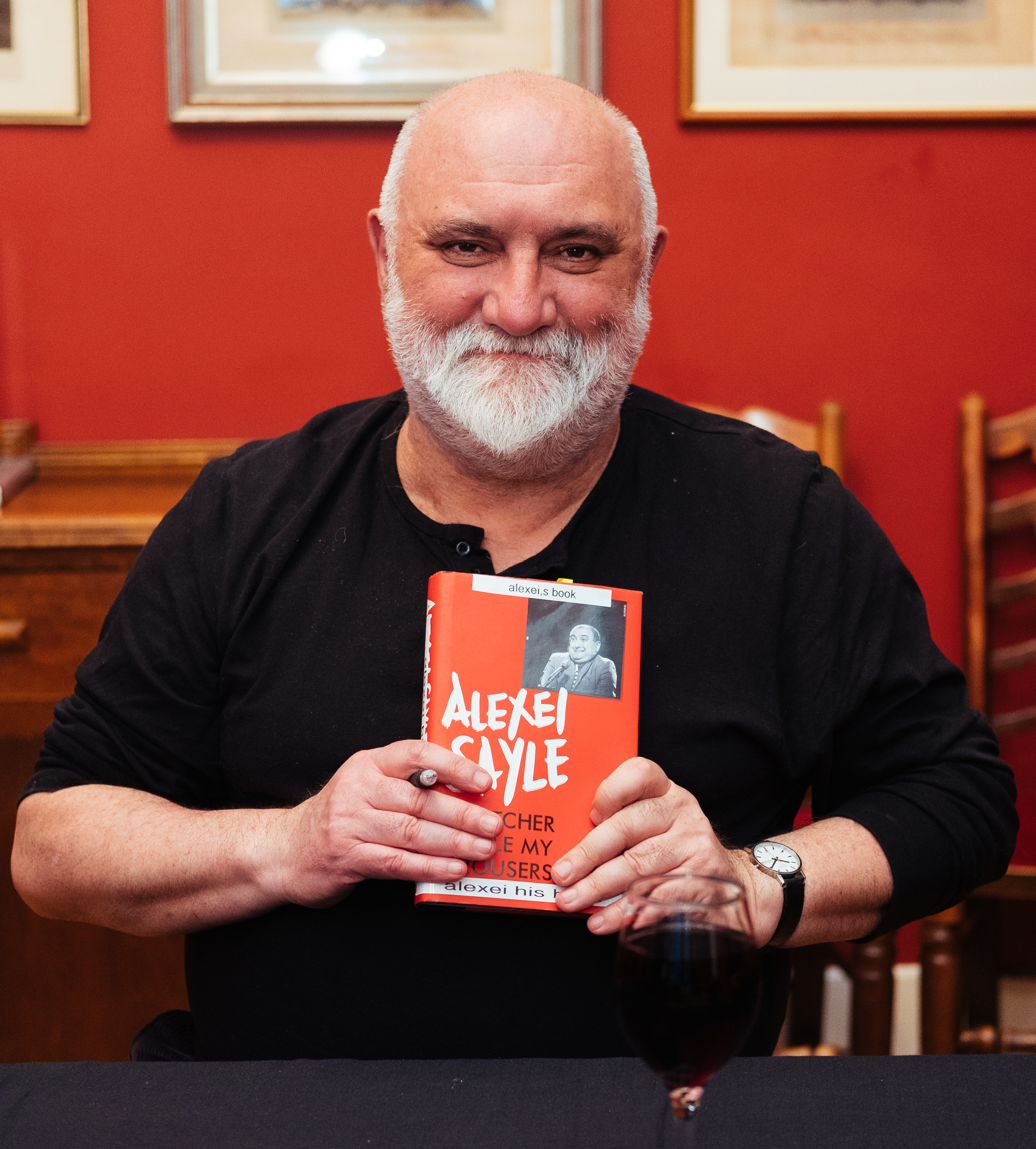
- Sayle at a literary festival in the Cambridge Union building in 2016
- Born: Alexei David Sayle; 7 August 1952 (age 74); Anfield, Liverpool, England
- Notable work: Alexei Sayle's Stuff; The Comic Strip Presents... The Young Ones; Indiana Jones and the Last Crusade; Gorky Park
- Spouse: Linda Rawsthorn (m. 1974)

Comedy career
- Years active: 1979–present
- Medium: Film, stand up, print, radio, television
- Genres: Alternative comedy, black comedy, character comedy, physical comedy, surreal humour, parody

Alexei David Sayle (born 7 August 1952) is an English actor, author, stand-up comedian, television presenter and former recording artist. He was a leading figure in the British alternative comedy movement in the 1980s. He was voted the 18th-greatest stand-up comic of all time on Channel 4's 100 Greatest Stand-Ups in 2007. In an updated 2010 poll he came 72nd.

Much of Sayle's humour is in the tradition of Spike Milligan and Monty Python, with riffs based on often absurd and surreal premises. His act is known for its cynicism and political awareness as well as physical comedy.

== Early life ==
Sayle is Jewish. He was born and brought up in the Anfield suburb of Liverpool, the son of Molly (Malka) Sayle (née Mendelson), a pools clerk, and Joseph Henry Sayle, a railway guard, both of whom were members of the Communist Party of Great Britain. Sayle's mother was of Lithuanian Jewish descent, and some members of his family were devout Jews. Sayle was named after Maxim Gorky, whose real name was Alexei Maximovich Peshkov.

From 1964 to 1969, he attended Alsop High School in Walton, and he was expelled halfway through sixth form. After that, Sayle took a foundation course in art in Southport before attending Chelsea College of Art and Design in London. He attended Garnett College in Roehampton, a training college for teachers in further education.

== Career ==
=== Stand-up comedy and theatre ===
When The Comedy Store opened in London in 1979, Sayle responded to an advert in Private Eye for would-be comedians, and became its first master of ceremonies. In 1980, comedy producer Martin Lewis saw Sayle perform at the Edinburgh Festival Fringe and became his manager.

Sayle became the leading performer at The Comic Strip. He appeared on The Comic Strip Album (1981) and recorded Cak! (1982). He also appeared in the stage show, film and comedy album of The Secret Policeman's Other Ball (1981–1982). An example of Sayle's humour was his attack on American phrases: "If you travel to the States ... they have a lot of different words than like what we use. For instance: they say 'elevator', we say 'lift'; they say 'drapes', we say 'curtains'; they say 'president', we say 'seriously deranged git!'"

In 1988, Sayle played the role of Trinculo the King's jester in Shakespeare's The Tempest, directed by Jonathan Miller at the Old Vic theatre in London. Sixteen years on from his last stand-up comedy tour, Sayle returned in 2011 as an MC, compering the middle section of At Last! The 1981 Show, produced by Stewart Lee at the Royal Festival Hall. Although this was mainly a nostalgia night with comedians such as Nigel Planer and Norman Lovett revisiting their material from the 1980s, Sayle premiered some new material that was more anecdotal than his previous work. Sayle said of his old style, "What I was doing, which I hadn't realised, was a comic persona. The guy in the tight suit was actually a creation. I thought it was me in a sense but it wasn't".

With artists such as Isy Suttie and Jim Bob, Sayle appeared at the fourth "Nine Lessons and Carols for Godless People" event at the Bloomsbury Theatre in December 2011. In January and February 2012, he compered four nights of stand-up comedy at the Soho Theatre. He completed a full UK stand-up tour in October and November 2012 and a sixteen-night residency at the Soho Theatre in January and February 2013, where he performed new material. He played a further ten nights at the Soho Theatre in April 2013. He also performed at the 2013 Edinburgh Festival Fringe.

=== Radio ===
Sayle's early work included several performances for Capital London. In 1981, he wrote and performed the radio series, Alexei Sayle and the Fish People, for which he won a Pye Radio Award (later known as the Sony Radio Awards). An album based on the show, The Fish People Tapes, again featuring Sayle, was released in 1984. This was followed by Alexei Sayle and the Dutch Lieutenant's Trousers, the name being a reference to John Fowles' The French Lieutenant's Woman. He also starred in two series of Lenin of the Rovers, a 1988 comedy about Britain's first communist football team. He has since contributed to many other radio shows, including writing the five-part sitcom series, Sorry About Last Night (1999), in which he also played the leading role. On 3 November 2006 he presented Chopwell Soviet, a 30-minute programme on BBC Radio 4 that reviewed the Chopwell miners 80 years after the village of Chopwell became known as Little Moscow. Sayle returned to Radio 4 in 2016 with Alexei Sayle's Imaginary Sandwich Bar, which has run for five critically acclaimed series so far. In 2019, he narrated the dramatisation of four of his short stories in the series Alexei Sayle's The Absence of Normal, again on Radio 4. A second series was broadcast in 2021.

Since February 2022 Sayle has presented BBC Radio 4's Alexei Sayle's Strangers on a Train.

=== Television ===
Sayle's first high-profile television appearances were on Central Independent Television's late-night alternative cabaret show O.T.T. (1982). He left nine weeks into the show's run to tour Australia with the Comic Strip. He played various roles in the situation comedy The Young Ones (1982–1984), along with Adrian Edmondson, Rik Mayall, Nigel Planer and Christopher Ryan. In the programme Sayle portrayed several members of an Eastern European family; the Balowskis. In 1985, he appeared in the Doctor Who serial Revelation of the Daleks. In a column for a British tabloid newspaper around the same time, he indicated that he wanted to become the "first Socialist Doctor." He also appeared in several episodes of The Comic Strip Presents... between 1985 and 1993, playing the two leading roles in Didn't You Kill My Brother? which he co-wrote with David Stafford and Pauline Melville. Sayle has co-written and starred in many other programmes, including three series of Alexei Sayle's Stuff (1988–1991), two series of The All New Alexei Sayle Show (1994–1995) and one series of Alexei Sayle's Merry-Go-Round (1998).

In 1989, Sayle was awarded an International Emmy for Stuff. In conversation with Mark Thomas on BBC Radio 4's informal chat-show Chain Reaction, Sayle revealed that the first he knew of the award was when he watched Channel 4 News and saw, to his amazement, Benny Hill collecting the award on his behalf. In 1990, Sayle had a fatwa proclaimed against him by a Muslim cleric from Syria after a joke on his BBC comedy show Stuff, which has never been withdrawn.

Sayle was signed in 1992 to a seven-year contract to play an Eastern European chef as a regular character on the American sitcom The Golden Palace, the sequel to The Golden Girls, but was fired and replaced by Cheech Marin before the pilot was filmed. The series was cancelled after one season.

In 1994, he presented the miniseries Drive, which gave advice for safe driving through Sayle's signature form of humour interspersed with serious pieces. In 2008, he wrote and presented Alexei Sayle's Liverpool, a three-part television series in which he reconnected with his home town. He stated in the programmes that on first hearing that Liverpool was to be awarded the European Capital of Culture, he received much criticism for describing the city as "philistine". He now feels that he does not know whether or not his original statement was true but as a result of making the series he does now consider Liverpool to be his home, and he has vowed to go back there more often in the future.

Sayle also narrated the Public information film (PIF) Moon Lighters about two moon creatures, Biblock and Hoblock and the dangers of lighters. Sayle replaced Rolf Harris as the narrator for the Nick Jr. and Milkshake! series Olive The Ostrich. Episodes featuring Sayle's narration commenced broadcasting on 22 July 2013.

=== Film ===
Sayle alternates his comedy work with performances as a character actor ranging from serious (Gorky Park, 1983) to humorous (Indiana Jones and the Last Crusade, 1989). He appeared in the 1992 Carry On film, Carry On Columbus along with other modern comedians, including Comic Strip founder Peter Richardson, as well as surviving members of the original Carry On team. He narrated the 2023 political documentary film Oh, Jeremy Corbyn: The Big Lie and the 2024 sequel, The Big Lie II: Starmer and the Genocide.

=== Music ===
Sayle has released five comedy singles with full musical backing, and one live recording from the Comedy Store in London 1981. This was "Dedication", released as a double A side with Alex Arundel, the London-based Scottish songwriter and founding member of Alternative Cabaret, with the song "When The Gold Runs Dry" being the other A side. Sayle's most successful single was "'Ullo John! Gotta New Motor?", which achieved Top 20 chart success in the UK upon re-release in 1984. Produced by Clive Langer and Alan Winstanley (who also produced for Madness and Elvis Costello), the record (in its 12-inch version) achieved notoriety owing to its extensive use of profane language. The two follow-up singles, "Didn't You Kill My Brother?", and "Meanwhile", were taken from the album Panic, the cover of which parodies the cover of the Michael Jackson album Off the Wall.

=== Writing ===
Sayle has written two short story collections, five novels, including a graphic novel and a radio series spin-off book, as well as columns for various publications. His book Great Bus Journeys of the World, co-written with David Stafford, is mostly a collection of his columns for Time Out and the Sunday Mirror. He was one of eight contributory authors to the BBC Three competition End of Story, in which members of the public completed the second half of stories written by established authors. The winning entry to Sayle's story, Imitating Katherine Walker, was written by freelance writer Arthur Allan. Sayle's autobiography, Stalin Ate My Homework, which deals with his early life, and which he describes as a 'satirical memoir', was published in 2010. In 2012 he joined The Daily Telegraph as a motoring columnist. In early 2015 he toured giving readings from the second volume of his autobiography Thatcher Stole My Trousers, published in 2016.

=== Internet ===
In November 2020, Sayle began hosting a monthly podcast, The Alexei Sayle Podcasts. Guests have included Josie Long, Stewart Lee, Omid Djalili, Lise Mayer, Diane Morgan and Jeremy Corbyn.

He also launched a YouTube channel, showcasing videos of various bike rides.

== Personal life ==
In 1974, Sayle married Linda Rawsthorn. He lives in Bloomsbury in central London and is a keen cyclist. He also owns a house near Granada, in southern Spain. He was diagnosed with sarcoidosis in 1990. A recurrence of this condition in 2015 led to him being rushed to hospital and then transferred to a neurological unit for a week.

== Political views ==
Around the age of 15, Sayle decided to join the Young Communist League, but only went to a few meetings. In 1968, he joined a Maoist organisation, the Communist Party of Britain (Marxist–Leninist). In 2009, he said that, while no longer active in left politics, "I still would adhere to those philosophical and economic ideas of Marxism that I got when I was sixteen. ... it's seemed to me as true now as it did then".

Sayle is a critic of fox hunting and was among more than 20 high-profile people who signed a letter to Members of Parliament in 2015 to oppose Conservative Prime Minister David Cameron's plan to amend the Hunting Act 2004.

=== Labour Party ===
In February 2016, Sayle said of Labour Party leader Jeremy Corbyn: "He's ascetic and morally incorruptible. The propaganda that's thrown against him is disgraceful. Until he appeared, you had to vote for one kind of Oxbridge twat or another, people who all go to the same dinner parties, people like the Ed Ballses and George Osbornes. Jeremy has shown that, within a democratic tradition, other things are possible." In 2016, he wrote a comment piece for The Guardian saying that he was happy to mock New Labour in his act, but now that Corbyn was about to "reform the party in his own image – ascetic, socialist, kindly and ethical", he would stop making jokes about Labour.

In May 2018, regarding the expulsion of Marc Wadsworth from the Labour Party, Sayle commented: "The Party should walk over broken glass to beg people of Marc's calibre to work with them – they are very few and Marc is one of the best. There is a battle going on to destroy and reverse the unexpected and amazing gains the left has made in the last three years. Marc is a casualty in that battle and I am joining the fight to see him re-instated to the front line."

In November 2019, along with other public figures, Sayle signed a letter supporting Corbyn, describing him as "a beacon of hope in the struggle against emergent far-right nationalism, xenophobia and racism in much of the democratic world" and endorsed him in the 2019 UK general election. In December 2019, along with 42 other leading cultural figures, he signed a letter endorsing the Labour Party under Corbyn's leadership in the 2019 general election. The letter stated that "Labour's election manifesto under Jeremy Corbyn's leadership offers a transformative plan that prioritises the needs of people and the planet over private profit and the vested interests of a few."

=== Involvement with accusations of party antisemitism ===
In January 2020, he was condemned by some Jewish groups after being one of thousands to sign an open letter criticising Rebecca Long-Bailey and other Labour leadership candidates for saying they would sign a 10-point pledge by the Board of Deputies of British Jews which it said was intended to combat antisemitism, should they be elected. The letter was organised by Momentum activist Jackie Walker and former Labour MP Chris Williamson.

In May 2021, Conservative MP Matthew Offord wrote to the BBC's director-general urging, unsuccessfully, that the planned broadcast of Desert Island Discs featuring Sayle, on 23 May, be halted on the basis that every broadcaster "should be wary of giving a platform to anyone who is seen to be 'excusing' antisemitism". There was an outcry on social media in response, rejecting the claim that Sayle was doing this, with support for Sayle from across the board, and the resulting hashtag #IStandWithAlexeiSayle trending on UK Twitter.

=== Double Down News discussion ===
In June 2026, Sayle along with Michael Rosen and Miriam Margolyes participated in a candid roundtable titled "They Call Us The Wrong Kind of Jew". They discussed their Jewish identities, their views on the Middle East and criticised Israeli state policies.

== Filmography ==
=== Film ===
Year	Title	Role
1980	Repeater	2nd Detective
1980	Transmogrification	Himself
1982	The Secret Policeman's Other Ball	Himself
1983	Gorky Park	Golodkin
1985	The Bride	Magar
1985	The Caucasian Chalk Circle	Lavrenti
1985	The Supergrass	Motorbike Cop
1985	Ligmalion: A Musical for the 80s	John Bull
1986	Whoops Apocalypse	Commisar Solzhenitsyn
1986	Solarbabies	Malice, Bounty Hunter
1987	Siesta	Cabbie
1987	The Love Child	The Voices (voice)
1987	Mister Corbett's Ghost	Toll Gate Keeper
1988	Jake's Journey	Head Torturer
1989	Indiana Jones and the Last Crusade	Sultan of The Hatay State
1992	Carry On Columbus	Achmed
1993	Reckless Kelly	Major Wib
1993	Deadly Currents	Seemuller
1996	Hospital!	X-Ray Operator
1997	Rhinoceros Hunting in Budapest	Beluga
1999	Swing	Mac "Mighty Mac"
2001	Don't Walk	Uncle Henry
2004	The Legend of the Tamworth Two	Newspaper Editor
2004	The Tale of Tarquin Slant	Window Cleaner
2005	Upstaged	Police Officer Duncan
2006	The Thief Lord	Ernesto Barbarossa
2008	The Surprise Demise of Francis Cooper's Mother	Narrator
2011	The Itch of the Golden Nit	Planet Jimmy (voice)
2016	Redtop	Colin Goodman
2017	Gloves Off	Algy
2018	Sometimes Always Never	Bill
2019	How to Build a Girl	Karl Marx
2023	Oh, Jeremy Corbyn: The Big Lie	Narrator
2024	The Big Lie II: Starmer and the Genocide	Narrator

=== Television ===
Year	Title	Role	Notes
1980 – 1981	Boom Boom, Out Go the Lights	Himself	
1981	Wolcott	Speaker In Market	
1982	O.T.T.	Himself	
1982	Comic Roots	Himself	
1982	The Private Life of the Ford Cortina	Himself, Presenter	
1982	Whoops Apocalypse	Commissar Solzhenitsyn	
1982 – 1984	The Young Ones	Jerzy Balowski / Brian Damage / Jester Balowski / Harry The Bastard / Police Recruiter / Train Driver / Billy Balowski	
1984	The Lenny Henry Show	Various Roles	
1984	Give Us A Break	Frank	Hustle, Bustle, Toil & Muscle
1985	Doctor Who	D.J.	Revelation of the Daleks
1985 – 1993	The Comic Strip Presents...	Inspector / Dad / Bride's Father / Mog / Carl Moss / Sterling Moss / Paul	
1986	Roland Rat: The Series	Himself	
1987	Ratman	Fatman	
1987	Up Line	Melvin Coombes	
1988	Les Girls	Mr. Korvus	Prints
1988 – 1991	Alexei Sayle's Stuff	Himself	
1990	The Gravy Train	Vlad Milcic	
1991	Selling Hitler	Konrad "Konny" Fischer	
1991	Big 30	Himself, Presenter	
1993	Lovejoy	Freddie "The Phone"	Series 4: "The Napoleonic Commode"
1993	Sex, Drugs & Dinner	Himself, Presenter	
1993 – 1994	Rubbish, King of the Jumble	Rubbish (voice)	
1994	The Unpleasant World of Penn & Teller	Himself	
1994	Paris	Alain Degout	
1994	Drive	Himself, Host	
1994 – 1995	The All New Alexei Sayle Show	Himself	
1996	Jackanory	Reader	The Diary of a Killer Cat
1996	Great Railway Journeys	Himself, Host	#3.2: Aleppo to Aqaba
1997	The History of Tom Jones, a Foundling	Puppeteer	
1997	Alexei Sayle's Comedy Hour	Himself	
1998	Alexei Sayle's Merry-Go-Round	Himself	
2000	Arabian Nights	BacBac	
2000	Animated Tales of the World	Troll (voice)	The Three Sisters who fell into a Mountain: A Story from Norway
2002	Tipping the Velvet	Charles Frobisher	
2003 – 2004	Keen Eddie	Rudy Alexander	
2004	Blood Matters	Himself, The Narrator)	What's Blood Got To Do With It?
2004	End Of Story	Himself	
2005	Bremner, Bird and Fortune	Pope John Paul II	
2006	Rob Brydon's Annually Retentive	Himself	Sharon
2007	Dawn French's Boys Who Do Comedy	Himself	
2008	Alexei Sayle's Liverpool	Himself, Presenter	
2009	Agatha Christie's Miss Marple	Dr. Maverick	They Do it with Mirrors
2010	Horrible Histories	Dr. Ushma	
2012	New Tricks	Anthony Marshall	Love Means Nothing in Tennis
2013	Olive the Ostrich	Narrator	
2014	Holby City	Bernie Reddy	Mummy Dearest
2017	Tate Liverpool at 30	Himself, Presenter	
2021	Casualty	Anton Malinovsky	Series 35: Episodes 26 and 29
2022	Mandy	Darren Dugdale	Fatberg
2022	Dodger	Mr. Elias Loomis	
2024	Richard Osman's House of Games	Himself, Contestant	Series 8 Episodes 21–25
2025	Celebrity Antiques Road Trip	Himself, Contestant	Series 13 Episodes 12 (with Nigel Planer)

=== Radio ===
Year	Title
1979 – 1981	Capital London
1981	Alexei Sayle and the Fish People
198?	Alexei Sayle and the Dutch Lieutenant's Trousers
1988	Lenin of the Rovers
1999	Sorry About Last Night
2006	Chopwell Soviet
2007	Alexei Sayle's Alternative Take
2008	Where Did All the Money Go?
2008	Migrant Music
2016 – present	Alexei Sayle's Imaginary Sandwich Bar
2019 – present	Alexei Sayle's The Absence of Normal
2022 – present	Alexei Sayle's Strangers On A Train

=== Videos ===
- 1983 The Alexei Sayle Pirate Video (Springtime)
- 1995 Alexei Sayle's Stuff (Paradox)

=== DVDs ===
- 2005 Alexei Sayle's Stuff Series One (BBC)
- 2006 Alexei Sayle's Stuff Series Two (BBC)
- 2006 Alexei Sayle's Stuff Series Three (BBC)

== Discography ==
=== Albums ===
- 1980: Live at The Comic Strip - compiled from mixture of variable quality bootleg private recordings by fans only available as a Tape Cassette (comedy club)
- 1982: Cak! - LP/Tape (Springtime/Island)
- 1984: The Fish People Tapes - LP/Tape (Island) (#62 UK, 11 March 1984)
- 1985: Panic - LP/Tape (CBS) (#95 Canada, 1 March 1986)

=== Singles ===
- 1981: "Pop-Up Toasters" (as Alexei's Midnight Runners) (Springtime/Island)
- 1982: "Albania! Albania! (Albanixey! Albanixey!)" (as The Albanian World Cup Squad) (Albaniox)
- 1982: "'Ullo John! Gotta New Motor?" (Springtime/Island) (No. 15 UK, 18 March 1984)
- 1985: "Didn't You Kill My Brother?" (CBS) (No. 93 Canada, 18 January 1986)
- 1986: "Meanwhile" (CBS)

== Bibliography ==
- Train To Hell (Methuen, 9 February 1984; hardcover ISBN 0-413-52460-4, paperback ISBN 0-413-52470-1) – novel co-written by David Stafford
- Geoffrey The Tube Train And The Fat Comedian (Methuen, 1987; paperback) – graphic novel, illustrated by Oscar Zárate
- Alexei Sayle's Great Bus Journeys Of The World (Methuen, October 1989; paperback ISBN 0-413-62670-9) – collected columns from Time Out and the Sunday Mirror
- Barcelona Plates (Sceptre, 17 February 2000; hardcover ISBN 0-340-76752-9, paperback ISBN 0-340-76753-7) – short story collection
- The Dog Catcher (Sceptre, 19 July 2001; hardcover ISBN 0-340-81868-9, paperback ISBN 0-340-81944-8) – short story collection
- Overtaken (Sceptre, 1 September 2003; hardcover ISBN 0-340-76768-5) – despite Train To Hell, this was publicised as being Sayle's first novel
- The Weeping Women Hotel (Sceptre, 27 February 2006; hardcover ISBN 0-340-83121-9) – novel
- Mister Roberts (Sceptre, 16 October 2008; hardcover ISBN 978-0-340-96155-1, paperback ISBN 0-340-96156-2) – Sayle's most recent novel
- Stalin Ate My Homework (Sceptre, 2 September 2010; hardcover ISBN 978-0-340-91957-6, paperback ISBN 978-0-340-91958-3) – autobiography
- Thatcher Stole My Trousers (Bloomsbury, 10 March 2016; hardcover ISBN 978-1-4088-6453-1) – autobiography (second volume)
- Alexei Sayle's Imaginary Sandwich Bar (Bloomsbury, 19 October 2017; hardcover ISBN 978-1-4088-9582-5) – radio series tie-in

=== Screenplays ===
- Night Voice (1990)
- 'Itch (1990)
- Sorry About Last Night (1995)
- Two Minutes (1996)
- Lose Weight... Ask Me How (2001)

== Collections ==
The University of Kent holds material by Sayle as part of the British Stand-Up Comedy Archive. The collection includes television scripts from The Young Ones and Doctor Who, radio scripts and material relating to his own shows.
