= Didn't You Kill My Brother? =

1988 episode of The Comic Strip Presents...

- The Comic Strip Presents... episode
- Episode no.: Series 3 Episode 20
- Original air date: 19 March 1988

"Didn't You Kill My Brother?" is an episode of The Comic Strip Presents..., a British television comedy. "Didn't You Kill My Brother" premiered on Channel 4 on Saturday 19 March 1988 at 10:50 p.m. CBS Records released the theme song, also titled "Didn't You Kill My Brother?" as a single in 1985.

Alexei Sayle plays both Carl and Sterling Moss, gangster twins loosely modelled on the Kray twins. There are cameo appearances by reggae poet Benjamin Zephaniah and Beryl Reid, in the role of the mother of the twins. The episode features a running theme that is an homage to the Italian film Bicycle Thieves.

Sterling and Carl are in many ways parodies of opposing political positions – opportunistic capitalism and idealistic socialism. The rehabilitated, self-educated Carl is community-focused and wants to build a better world, whereas his unrepentant criminal brother Sterling is simply interested in profit.

== Plot ==
The story begins with Carl Moss about to be released from prison after serving five years of a 30-year sentence for complicity in two murders. He was granted early parole because of his astounding educational achievements while in prison. He has become engaged to his parole officer and sociology teacher, Pauline Sneek, who wants to use him as an example of her work, to advance herself socially and professionally.

Upon Carl's release, Pauline arranges a job for him at a community centre as an "unstructured activities co-ordinator". Carl discovers that the centre has equipment that could be used to train young people in manufacturing and technology, but when he enthuses on its educational potential, Pauline retorts: "I don't want to go on Wogan with a man who makes things – this isn't the seventies. Anyway the CBI would never stand for it. If I catch you making things you'll be back inside pissing in a tin pot before you can say Amnesty International!"

Carl begins to teach teenagers how to use the equipment, and together they manufacture bicycles, which angers Sterling, who runs a bicycle theft ring. Sterling conspires with their mother to bring about Carl's demise, and in a confrontation at the Community Police Over-60s Reggae Night, one of the brothers is killed, although it is not totally clear whether it is Carl or Sterling.

== Single ==
"Didn't You Kill My Brother?"

Single by Alexei Sayle

from the album Panic
- Released: 1985
- Recorded: 1985
- Length: 4:00
- Label: CBS

Alexei Sayle singles chronology
"'Ullo John! Gotta New Motor?" (1982)	"Didn't You Kill My Brother?" (1985)

Sayle also performed a song called "Didn't You Kill My Brother?" which was released as a single. A music video was also filmed, which was broadcast in the US and Canada, despite the series not airing in those territories at that time. As in the episode, Sayle plays multiple characters in the video.

=== Charts ===
Chart (1986)	Peak position
Australia (Kent Music Report)	86
Canada (RPM)	93
New Zealand (Recorded Music NZ)	5
