= Gerald Holtom =

English artist and designer (1914–1985)

Gerald Herbert Holtom (20 January 1914 – 18 September 1985) was an English artist and designer. A graduate of the Royal College of Art in London, in 1958 he designed the Nuclear Disarmament (ND) logo, which was adopted the same year by the British Campaign for Nuclear Disarmament (CND), and later became an international peace symbol.

== ND symbol ==
Educated at Gresham's School in Holt, Norfolk, Holtom was a graduate of the Royal College of Art in London. He had been a conscientious objector during World War II. In 1958, he was working for the Ministry of Education.

On 21 February 1958 he designed the nuclear disarmament logo for the first Aldermaston March, organised by the Direct Action Committee against Nuclear War (DAC) in Easter 1958 (4–7 April).

There are differing accounts of how the design was conceived. According to CND, Holtom had been invited by the DAC to design artwork for the Aldermaston March. He showed his preliminary sketches to a DAC meeting in February 1958 at the Peace News offices in North London. According to Christopher Driver, who wrote about CND in a 1964 book, The Disarmers, Holtom brought the design, unsolicited, to the chairperson of his local anti-nuclear group in Twickenham and alternative versions were shown at the inaugural meeting of the London CND. Driver wrote, "The first mark on paper, according to Mr. Holtom, was a white circle within a black square, followed by various versions of the Christian cross within the circle". But the cross, for these people, had too many wrong associations – with the Crusaders, with military medals, with the public blessing by an American chaplain of the airplane that flew to Hiroshima – and eventually the arms of the cross were depicted as declining, forming the composite semaphore signal for the letters N and D (the letters "N" (two arms outstretched pointing down at 45 degrees) and "D" (one arm upraised above the head) of the flag semaphore alphabet representing the words nuclear disarmament), and at the same time suggesting a gesture of human despair against the background of a globe. Eric Austen, who adapted the symbol for ceramic lapel badges, is said to have "discovered that the 'gesture of despair' motif had long been associated with 'the death of man', and the circle with 'the unborn child'". Holtom also rejected the image of the dove, as it had been appropriated by the Soviet peace propaganda.

Trademark registration of the logo was never carried out, and since the 1960s the logo has become known to, and used by, the public as a general-purpose peace symbol.

ND Symbol

N

D

ND

In addition to this primary genesis, Holtom additionally cited as inspiration Goya's Peasant Before the Firing Squad:

I was in despair. Deep despair. I drew myself: the representative of an individual in despair, with hands palm outstretched outwards and downwards in the manner of Goya's peasant before the firing squad. I formalised the drawing into a line and put a circle round it.

The reference is to Goya's The Third of May 1808 (1814), although the peasant shown in this painting has his arms stretched upwards, not downwards.

== Boat design ==
Holtom was also a boat designer; he designed a self-stabilising hydrofoil boat, the Foiler (21 feet), which started production in 1977.

== Personal life ==
Holtom had six children, four with his first wife, and two with his second wife.

== See also ==
- Peace symbols
- Extinction symbol
