= The All New Alexei Sayle Show =

British comedy sketch TV show 1994–95

- Genre: Comedy
- Written by: Alexei Sayle; Graham Linehan; Arthur Mathews
- Directed by: Metin Hüseyin
- Starring: Alexei Sayle; Jean Marsh; Peter O'Brien; Peter Capaldi; Felicity Montagu
- Country of origin: United Kingdom
- Original language: English
- No. of series: 2
- No. of episodes: 12

Production
- Running time: 30 minutes

Original release
- Network: BBC
- Release: 6 January 1994 – 1 July 1995

Related
- Alexei Sayle's Stuff; Alexei Sayle's Merry-Go-Round

The All New Alexei Sayle Show was a comedy sketch show broadcast on BBC2 television for a total of twelve episodes, over two series in 1994 and 1995. The title sequence featured Alexei Sayle as an innocent, newly arrived man in London singing cheerful lyrics and dancing around Trafalgar Square, in a spoof of American television shows such as the Mary Tyler Moore Show.

It was the successor to Alexei Sayle's Stuff, and predecessor of Alexei Sayle's Merry-Go-Round. Sayle's co-star from Channel 4's The Gravy Train, future dual Academy Award winner Christoph Waltz appeared in a sketch during its run.

== Recurring characters ==
The show differed from Alexei Sayle's Stuff mainly in its introduction of recurring characters who include:

- Alexei's alter ego, Bobby Chariot. Bobby is a Scouse comic of the old school, who appears as a warm-up act during breaks when the show has supposedly 'broken down' for technical reasons. His catchphrase "How you diddling?" will invariably fail to ignite the audience, prompting the reply, ". . . Bloody sod you, then." He will then regale them with anecdotes about his wife having left him, his drink problem, and sleeping in his Jag. He is an archetypal 'traditional' comedian who combines the least politically correct sides of Jimmy Tarbuck, Ken Dodd and Stan Boardman with a bit of Mr Sayle. He will often pick on the audience for cheap laughs, then turn on them when they remain unresponsive. Often, rather than being seen in front of the audience, he is pictured sitting among them, pouring his heart out to some poor uninterested, bored soul. Bobby also features in the subsequent show Alexei Sayle's Merry-Go-Round.
- Bobby's even more depressing and hopeless gag writer, played by Stephen Lewis, still bashing out bad puns on a manual typewriter.
- A caricature of John Smith, who was leader of the Labour Party at the time.
- Performance artists Egbert and Bill (a lampoon of real-life artists Gilbert and George), perform together with John Sparkes.
- Nancy and Spike. Two radical lesbians who run a feminist bicycle shop in Hackney called "Menstrual cycles". Depending on viewpoint, these are either very un-PC or overly PC characters.

== Running sketches ==
Both series of the show included running sketches.

- Psycho Ward 11 in Series 1 was a spoof Australian hospital soap featuring Jean Marsh and Peter O'Brien.
- Drunk in Time in Series 2 satirised the popular late 1960s cult sci-fi TV series The Time Tunnel. It featured Peter Capaldi as Sayle's fellow drunk time-traveling companion, and also Jenny Agutter and Alfred Marks as the scientists back at the base.

== Sources ==
- The All New Alexei Sayle Show at IMDb
- Johnson RK, British TV Show Reviews
- "UK Comedy" on Memorable TV
