= 'Ullo John! Gotta New Motor? =

Single by Alexei Sayle

from the album The Fish People Tapes
- A-side: 'Ullo John! Gotta New Motor?; (Part I)
- B-side: 'Ullo John! Gotta New Motor?; (Part II)
- Released: 1982; 1983 (re-issue)
- Recorded: 1982
- Length: 3:25
- Label: Springtime; Island
- Songwriter: Alexei Sayle
- Producers: Clive Langer; Alan Winstanley

Alexei Sayle singles chronology
| "Albania! Albania! (Albanixey! Albanixey!)" (1982) | "'Ullo John! Gotta New Motor?" (1982) | "Didn't You Kill My Brother?" (1985) |

Audio sample
- file; help

"'Ullo John! Gotta New Motor?" is a song written by the English actor and comedian Alexei Sayle, originally released as a single in the UK in 1982. The single eventually achieved UK top twenty success in 1984, following a reissue.

The song and its title have subsequently been adapted and reused in a number of different cultural contexts.

The music video was filmed on Goldhawk Road in West London.

== Song structure ==
The song is predominantly a rap comprising a mix of banal, absurd and generally unconnected sentences (including the song's title), each sentence being delivered twice in succession. Occasionally, a succeeding line provides the punch line to the preceding one. These rap passages are occasionally interrupted by short comic monologues or the consecutive repetition of the song's title for an extended period.

The UK single features four versions of the song spread across the 7- and 12-inch formats, and designated "Part I" through "Part IV". All versions feature the same pop and funk musical backdrop, but lyrically the versions are distinct from each other.

== Lyrical themes ==
All versions of the song feature Cockney phrasing and slang, often heavily stylised for comic effect. Hence, in the song's title, "'ullo" is "hullo" with a dropped-H, "John" is a colloquial placeholder name (comparable to "mate"), and "motor" is shortened slang for "motor car".

Several London placenames are mentioned in the song, including Peckham, Bermondsey and Stanmore. Originally released in 1982, the song references several then topical themes, such as the ongoing construction of the Thames Barrier.

Recurrent among these themes is the Ford Motor Company's announced decision to replace the long-running Ford Cortina brand with the new Ford Sierra by September 1982. The song asserts the "poetry" of the Cortina, and the superior sound of the name "Cortina" to "Sierra", with varying degrees of vigour, during "Part II" to "Part IV" of the song.

This lyrical theme was reflected in the marketing of the single: the single's front cover features Sayle leaning against a Ford Cortina Mark V, the rear cover features a reproduction of a Ford press release for the 1973 Cortina 2000E model, and the 1983 reissue included a picture disc format featuring Sayle reclining on the bonnet of a Cortina Mark III.

"Part IV" of the song, included on the UK 12-inch, differs significantly from the other three versions lyrically, featuring a sustained onslaught of high-speed profanity and faux-coprolalia, which was adapted from the "Mr. Sweary" routine then current in Sayle's live stand-up act (the lyrics reference Mr. Sweary at one point). "Part IV" also contains profane variations and parodies of some of the lyrics and monologues featured in the other versions of the song.

Largely as a consequence of "Part IV", the reissued 12-inch sleeve was labelled with a warning sticker that read: "This record contains explicit language – Abusive, lewd and funny – Expletives not deleted".

== Chart success ==
The single was not a hit upon its original release, but it received a reissue from Island Records in late 1983, by which time Sayle had appeared in Gorky Park and several TV shows, including the first series of the BBC sitcom The Young Ones, and the ITV sitcom Whoops Apocalypse.

The re-issued single eventually reached No. 15 in the UK singles chart on 24 March 1984.

== Cultural influence ==
The song and its title have been adapted and reused numerous times in a variety of contexts.

Around the time of the single's initial release (1982) BBC2 Arena had made a programme detailing the cultural influence of the Ford Cortina and its recently announced demise; "The Private Life of the Ford Cortina" in which Sayle (the presenter) talks through the influence of the car on the post war working classes and also features villain John McVicar (who appears on the cover artwork alongside Sayle) discussing Britain's most stolen car of the period.

In 1985, Toshiba ran a TV advertising campaign that featured the song with altered lyrics – "'Ello Tosh! Gotta Toshiba?" – performed by Ian Dury of the Blockheads.From Fulham With Love

Also in 1985, in the Minder episode "From Fulham With Love" Nigel Daley (Arthur's nephew) greets Detective Chisholm outside "Daley Enterprises" with "'Ullo, John, wanna new motor" in a very similar delivery to Sayle.

Upon an obscenity trial over their song "Bata Motel", the punk rock band Crass presented the B-side to this song as an example that there were much more obscene records out there than "Bata Motel". While it was being played, much of the court responded with uproarious laughter. This outraged the magistrates, who threatened anyone who laughed with a charge for contempt of court. This resulted in members of the band reportedly biting their lips so hard that they bled, so as to prevent themselves from laughing.

The No. 18 UK single "Has It Come to This?" from the Streets' debut studio album Original Pirate Material (2001) appears to reference the song in the lyric "Bravery in the face of defeat All line up and grab yer seat – Cos Tony's got a new motor – SR Nova driving like a joyrider – Speeding to the corner – Yer mother warned it'll be a sound system banger"

In 2005, the song was revived for a new Toshiba campaign featuring singer Suggs of Madness, Toshiba's advertising agency claiming that "the 'ello Tosh tagline has gone down in advertising history, demonstrated by the fact people still remember it today".

Sayle himself has commented on the longevity of the song's title, in his column for The Independent: "There is seldom a magazine or newspaper article even loosely connected with cars or the transport industry in general that doesn't use some variation of that title. Only last week there was a piece in the London Evening Standard about powerful in-car stereos entitled, 'Ullo Jon, Gotta New Woofer?' In fact sometimes the articles don't even have anything to do with cars."

Looking back on the single itself almost twenty years after its release, Sayle has also stated: "It is a really good song! Original, tuneful and the only Top 20 record to mention tropical fish and Peckham."

== Other versions ==
Upon the release of the single, Sayle performed the song live on the TV series O.T.T., broadcast 27 February 1982, using a musical backing track that differed from the released single.

Sayle also performed the song on the live comedy album Cak!, released later in 1982. The album contained "Say Hello Mr. Sweary", an example of the routine that provided the lyrical concept for "Part IV" of "'Ullo John! Gotta New Motor?".

Sayle performed the song, with different lyrics ("out here it's really breezy coz I'm riding free and easy/I got a brand new Morrison, a brand new 10-speed Morrison") on a TV commercial in New Zealand for Morrison bicycles.

== Single releases ==
All tracks written by Alexei Sayle except "Pop Up Toasters" by Sayle and Harry Bogdanovs.
All tracks produced by Clive Langer and Alan Winstanley except "Pop Up Toasters" produced by Martin Lewis.

=== UK 7-inch ===
1. "'Ullo John! Gotta New Motor?" (Part I) – 3:25
2. "'Ullo John! Gotta New Motor?" (Part II) – 4:02
- Original release by Springtime Records, distributed by Island (1982, WIP 6768)
- Reissued by Springtime/Island (1983, IS 162), also issued as a shaped picture disc (ISP 162)

=== UK 12-inch ===
1. "'Ullo John! Gotta New Motor?" (Part III) – 8:43
2. "'Ullo John! Gotta New Motor?" (Part IV) – 4:45
- Original release by Springtime Records, distributed by Island (1982, 12 WIP 6768)
- Reissued by Springtime/Island (1983, 12 IS 162)

=== Australian 12-inch ===
1. "'Ullo John! Gotta New Motor?" (Part III) – 8:43
2. "Pop Up Toasters" – 2:26
- Limited edition release by Island Records (1984, X-13159)
