= The Fish People Tapes =

Studio album by Alexei Sayle
- Released: 1984
- Recorded: 1982 – 1984
- Genres: Comedy, new wave
- Length: 51:25
- Label: Island
- Producers: David Stafford ("'Ullo John! Gotta New Motor?" by Clive Langer & Alan Winstanley)

Alexei Sayle chronology
Cak! (1982)	The Fish People Tapes (1984)	Panic (1985)

Singles from The Fish People Tapes
- 1. "'Ullo John! Gotta New Motor?" Released: 1982, 1983

Professional ratings
Review scores
Source	Rating
AllMusic	4/5 stars

The Fish People Tapes is a 1984 comedy album by the English actor and comedian Alexei Sayle. Subtitled "an Alexei Sayle mystery", the album comprises an episodic detective serial plus occasional musical interludes. This is his second album.

The album is based on Alexei Sayle and the Fish People, an award-winning radio series originally broadcast by Capital Radio in 1981.

Although the radio series was originally broadcast in the London area, the album includes faked DJ links that suggest the show is being broadcast in the fictitious new town of Milton Springsteen, the name being an amalgamation of Milton Keynes and Bruce Springsteen. The corresponding album track "That's Milton Springsteen" is a parody of the Jam song "That's Entertainment".

In addition to performing the album's songs, Sayle voices all of the album's dramatic parts, including the eponymous lead character, a community detective based in Stoke Newington.

The album's final track, "'Ullo John! Gotta New Motor?", which was a hit single for Sayle in February 1984, is unrelated to the rest of the album and was included with the sleeve notation "just squeezed in!".

== Track listing ==
All tracks written by Alexei Sayle/David Stafford except where noted.
All tracks produced by David Stafford except * produced by Clive Langer and Alan Winstanley.

=== Side one ===
1. "Metro to the Disco"
2. Episodes One and Two
3. "It Ain't Hard to Be an Animal" (Sayle, Harry Bogdanovs)
4. Episode Three
5. "20 Tom Waits and a Box of Swans" (Sayle, Bogdanovs, Stafford)
6. Episode Four
7. "That's Milton Springsteen"

=== Side two ===
1. "That's Milton Springsteen"
2. Episode Five
3. "Song of the Revolutionary Stool Pigeon"
4. Episode Six
5. "'Ullo John! Gotta New Motor?" (Sayle)*
