= Comic Roots =

British television series

- Genre: Biography
- Starring: Keith Allen; Nicholas Ball; Roy Barraclough; Billy Dainty; Les Dawson; Nev Goodwyn; Irene Handl; Roy Hudd; Michael Palin; Sandy Powell; Alexei Sayle; Paul Shane; Graham Stuart-Harris; Kenneth Williams
- Country of origin: United Kingdom
- No. of episodes: 8

Production
- Running time: 8x30 minutes

Original release
- Network: BBC1
- Release: 2 August 1982 – 2 September 1983

Comic Roots was a British television series from the early 1980s, documenting the biographies and influences of a number of popular comedians of the era.

Episodes included features on Les Dawson, and Alexei Sayle. Sayle converted his own documentary into an impromptu pub crawl.

== Episodes ==
=== Series one (1982) ===
1. Les Dawson's Lancashire (2 August 1982)
2. Roy Hudd's Croydon (9 August 1982)
3. Irene Handl's London (16 August 1982)
4. Paul Shane's Rotherham (16 August 1982)

=== Series two (1983) ===
1. Michael Palin (12 August 1983)
2. Billy Dainty (19 August 1983)
3. Alexei Sayle (26 August 1983)
4. Kenneth Williams (2 September 1983)
