= Cak! =

Live album by Alexei Sayle
- Released: 1982
- Recorded: 1982
- Genres: Alternative comedy; new wave
- Labels: Springtime; Island

Alexei Sayle chronology
The Comic Strip (1981)	Cak! (1982)	The Fish People Tapes (1984)

Cak! is a 1982 live comedy album by the English actor and comedian Alexei Sayle. This was his first album, although he had contributed previously to The Comic Strip's compilation album from 1981. The album consists of spoken word segments and songs. "Song for Len" is about Leonard Cohen. In the "Dire Straits" sketch from Alexei Sayle's Stuff, a copy of Cak! and The Fish People Tapes can be seen on the record shelves.

The album ends with an early version of "'Ullo John! Gotta New Motor?", the studio recording of which (from The Fish People Tapes) made the UK Top Twenty in 1984. Sayle also performed "Dr. Martens Boots" on The Young Ones second episode "Oil", also from 1982.

== Track listing ==
A side

1. "Sausalito"
2. "Happy Days Part 1"
3. "Dr. Martens Boots"
4. "Stoke Newington Calling"
5. "The Ballad of Chris and Judith"
6. "Some Stuff"
7. "Hello, How Are You?"

B side

1. "Some More Stuff"
2. "The Wine Bars of Old Hampstead Town"
3. "Happy Days Part 2"
4. "Cak!"
5. "Song for Len"
6. "Commercial Break"
7. "Radical Posture"
8. "Long Distance Information"
9. "Das Kap Rap"
10. "Say Hello Mr. Sweary"
11. "'Ullo John! Gotta New Motor?"
