= Oh Jeremy Corbyn: The Big Lie =

2023 documentary film

- Directed by: Chris Reeves
- Produced by: Norman Thomas
- Production company: Platform Films
- Release date: February 2023

Oh Jeremy Corbyn: The Big Lie is a 2023 documentary film about the former British Labour Party leader Jeremy Corbyn.

== Synopsis ==
According to the Morning Star, the film documents Jeremy Corbyn's time as the leader of the Labour Party, internal struggles in the party, and accusations of anti-semitism. The film presents events as a conspiracy against Corbyn and the antisemitism allegations as inaccurate. It accuses Keir Starmer of campaigning against Corbyn while serving in his shadow cabinet.

== Production and screenings ==
The film was produced by Platform Films and released in February 2023. It premiered in the UK on 9 February 2023. It was directed by Chris Reeves and produced by Norman Thomas. Alexei Sayle narrated, whilst Graham Bash, Moshé Machover, Chris Williamson, David Miller, Andrew Murray and Jackie Walker contributed to the documentary.

A planned screening of the film on 25 June at Glastonbury Festival 2023 was cancelled by festival organisers, following a complaint from Marie van der Zyl of the Board of Deputies of British Jews. Van der Zyl stated that the film promoted hatred and falsely accused the Board of Deputies of being involved in a conspiracy against Jeremy Corbyn. The Jewish Chronicle reported that Norman Thomas rejected the antisemitics accusations. After the cancellation, the group Activist Video Collective said it had shown the film at the Speakers Forum tent during the festival.

Portsmouth Film Society scheduled two screenings of the film in August 2023.

== Critical reception ==
Author Rachel Shabi, wrote that the film attributes all complaints of antisemitism in the UK Labour Party to Israeli interference in British politics, and that the "film does make central an argument based on antisemitic conspiracy layered upon conspiracy."

Naomi Wimborne-Idrissi of Jewish Voice for Labour agreed with Jewish Israeli academic Moshe Machover, who said in the film that "one of the Big Lies of our time – the lie of the Labour Party being infested with antisemitism" was created to "stop the Corbyn juggernaut".

== See also ==
- Israel lobby in the United Kingdom
- Israel–United Kingdom relations
- Labour Party leadership of Jeremy Corbyn
