= The Big Lie (1951 film) =

1951 film

- Production company: US Army
- Release date: 1951
- Running time: 19 minutes
- Country: United States
- Language: English

The Big Lie is a 1951 anti-communist propaganda film produced by the US Army.

It aimed to portray the Soviet Union as an aggressive totalitarian empire much like the recently-defeated Nazi Germany, and indeed begins with a quote by Adolf Hitler: "The great masses will more easily fall victim to a big lie than to a small one".

The film links the communist and Nazi ideologies by showing scenes of forced labor, sham elections, kangaroo courts and parades held by the armed forces or by regime-controlled youth organizations: in each case a swastika-shaped wipe introduces an example from Nazi Germany, followed by a hammer-and-sickle-shaped wipe to introduce an equivalent example from the Soviet Union.

== Plot ==
The Big Lie

As the Iron Curtain falls, the peoples of Eastern Europe, China and North Korea are "sold out" to Kremlin-controlled puppet regimes. In common with other American propaganda of the time, the People's Republic of China is described as a Soviet satellite state, although it never actually was. Footage of marching is shown for each of the satellite states to symbolize how these countries fell under the Soviet yoke. Only Yugoslavia under Josip Tito escaped the Kremlin's grasp and regained its independence.

The final part of the film attacks the Soviet-front World Peace Council, contrasting their rhetoric of peace – repeated to film footage of Soviet armaments factories and military parades in Red Square – with the realities of Communist warmongering in Greece, Indochina, Korea and China.

The film concludes with the exhortation to "Beware the Big Lie! Beware the Dove that goes BOOM", as Pablo Picasso's La Colombe ("Dove", which the World Peace Council was using as its symbol) is replaced by the cartoon La colombe qui fait BOUM, originally produced by the French anti-communist group Paix et Liberté. In this cartoon the dove is metamorphosing into a Soviet tank – its wings have become tank treads, and its head is a tank turret.
