= Eric Austen =

English designer and teacher

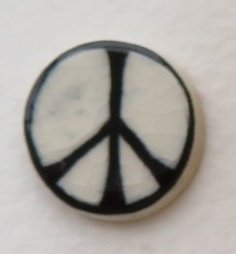
1958 ceramic CND badge made by Austen

Eric Austen (3 November 1922 – 1 July 1999) was an English designer and teacher, and played a part in the creation of the well-known ND symbol, as used, among others, by the Campaign for Nuclear Disarmament (CND).

== Early life ==
He grew up in the Norfolk village of Hethersett, and described his childhood in his 1996 book All that I was : a village childhood in the thirties (Mousehold Press: ISBN 9781874739074), which has a foreword by Richard Hoggart. He attended Hethersett British School and then City of Norwich School, a grammar school to which he won a scholarship.

== Work ==
During the Second World War Austen, who was a pacifist, was exempted from military service as a conscientious objector, and worked for the Forestry Commission. After the war he taught in primary school, then studied at the University of London, Institute of Education while teaching at Southlands College (1964–1972).

He taught at Goldsmiths, University of London from 1972, specialising in art education, and was promoted to senior lecturer. He held a 1981 exhibition of 40 giant "Life Books" which held more than 2000 quotations from the world's literature and philosophy. This exhibition was revived in 1990 at Friends House in London.

=== Accomplishment ===
The CND acknowledges Austen as the maker of the first ND badges, but attributes the design of the symbol to Gerald Holtom. These earliest badges were made in ceramic (fireclay) – which Austen noted would mean they could be among the very few man-made objects to survive a nuclear inferno. Austen is quoted as saying of the design: "the gesture of despair had long been associated with the death of Man and the circle with the unborn child."

== Personal life ==
Austen was married three times; to Nina Carmela, Audrey Whiting and Kate Taylor.

When he died of leukemia on 1 July 1999, he left a daughter Gea (by Audrey Whiting) and two grandsons.

In 2017, Austen's daughter Gea launched online petitions at change.org and 38 Degrees, addressed to the CND, Jeremy Corbyn (leader of the Labour Party) and Kate Hudson (General secretary of CND), asking that her father should be recognised as having designed the CND symbol.
