= Paix et Liberté =

Anti-communist movement

Paix et Liberté (French: [pɛ e libɛʁte], Peace and Liberty) was an anti-communist movement that operated in France during the 1950s.

== Founding ==
In response to the Stockholm Appeal for nuclear disarmament, Jean-Paul David, then Radical Socialist Party deputy mayor of Mantes-la-Jolie and later Secretary General of the Rally of Republican Lefts, created Paix et Liberté in 1950, to counter the activities of the French Communist Party.

Its propaganda efforts received substantial financial backing from the United States. Paix et Liberté was one of the organizations of the "anti-Communist apparatus" booming during the Cold War. The organization had the support of prime minister René Pleven and many other politicians of the time. But the experiment stopped in 1955 because of a thaw in international relations.

== Propaganda ==
Paix et Liberté published, distributed and posted hundreds of thousands of posters in France in the 1950s. These posters were reproduced in the form of vignettes, attacking the Soviet Union and communist ideology, but also the French Communist Party and its leaders, such as Maurice Thorez and Jacques Duclos, accusing them of being agents of the USSR. Jean-Paul David also used the radio with his show Les causeries au coin du feu (fireside chats), which lasted only a few minutes, inaugurated on September 22, 1950.

== Posters ==
"The dove that goes BOOM" (1950, 300,000 copies) was the first in a series of posters (on average 3 per month were released between 1950 and 1955). It parodied Pablo Picasso's Dove of Peace, that Louis Aragon had chosen to symbolize the congress of the World Peace Council, held in Paris in April 1949. In this picture, the dove was shown metamorphosing into a Soviet tank: its wings have become tank treads and its head a tank turret. This picture was later used at the end of the 1951 US Army anti-communist propaganda film The Big Lie.

In reference to the Stockholm Appeal (L'appel de Stockholm in French), a poster was produced of La pelle de Stockholm ("The shovel of Stockholm"), digging the grave of the countries in Eastern Europe.
