= The Big Lie (2012 film) =

- Release date: 2012
- Country: Israel

HaSheker HaGadol is a 2012 Israeli social drama film directed by Yamin Messika and Yarmi Kadoshi, owners of Hamizrah Productions. The film stars Liat Banai, Shirley Ben-David, Yankele Ben Sira, footballer Eran Levy, Beber Yoko, with a cameo from Yaron London as himself.

== Plot ==
Liat, a single mother, is left alone after her husband is murdered due to unpaid debts. Fighting with all her strength to survive, Liat receives help from a journalist who rallies to her side. Together with neighborhood residents, he helps Liat battle corruption. Their struggle highlights the film's unsettling perspective, portraying the police as a tool for city officials and real estate moguls, and the individual’s uphill battle to prove their innocence in the face of an unyielding judicial system.
