= Alexei Sayle's Stuff =

- Genre: Sketch comedy
- Written by: Andrew Marshall; David Renwick; Alexei Sayle
- Directed by: Marcus Mortimer
- Starring: Alexei Sayle; Angus Deayton; Tony Millan; Harriet Thorpe
- Country of origin: United Kingdom
- Original language: English
- No. of series: 3
- No. of episodes: 18

Production
- Producer: Marcus Mortimer
- Running time: 30 minutes

Original release
- Network: BBC2
- Release: 13 October 1988

Related
- The All New Alexei Sayle Show; Alexei Sayle's Merry-Go-Round

Alexei Sayle's Stuff is a British television comedy sketch show which ran on BBC2 for a total of 18 episodes over 3 series from 1988 to 1991.

== Cast ==
Alexei Sayle's Stuff stars stand-up comedian Alexei Sayle, with a recurring cast including Angus Deayton, Mark Williams, Arabella Weir, Tony Millan, Jan Ravens, Owen Brenman, Harriet Thorpe, Felicity Montagu and Morwenna Banks.

== Synopsis ==
Sketches are interspersed with Sayle's trademark angry stand-up monologues, delivered from increasingly odd locations. Sayle is seen traversing the country on a moped in a vague attempt to catalogue and comprehend all the "stuff" about him. The style of humour is often highly surreal and blunt. The series main writers were Sayle himself, Andrew Marshall and David Renwick, whilst additional material was written by Sayle's longtime collaborator David Stafford and comedian and promoter Huw David Thomas. Although Sayle's humour in the programme covers many bases, politics is always a favourite target: "Recently I had to get married, 'cos I got my girlfriend into trouble – got her involved in the civil war in Angola." Various episodes also feature sketches based around BBC2 presentation, including satirical continuity announcers and faux trailers.

A screenshot from the second series of Alexei Sayle's Stuff, showing the spoof cartoon "Steamboat Fatty".

At the beginning of series 2, in a sequence spoofing the creation of Disney's Mickey Mouse, a sketch reveals that Alexei Sayle is in fact a cartoon character. Viewers are shown a short extract from Sayle's very first animated appearance from fifty years previously, named "Steamboat Fatty" (spoofing Steamboat Willie, the first Mickey Mouse cartoon), as well as Mouseketeer-esque children dancing around wearing bald wigs. An edited version of this sketch became the title sequence for series 2.

Series 1's titles feature a handsome young man arriving at BBC Television Centre to the accompaniment of Dion's hit The Wanderer, with prosthetic make-up and padding being applied to change his appearance to that of Alexei Sayle, followed by a BBC receptionist uttering the phrase "Who is that fat bastard?" which was to become the show's catch-phrase. Series 3's title sequence is a pastiche of Zorro, the theme song being sung mariachi style ("This fat renegade / Carves a 'B' with his blade / A 'B' that stands for 'Bastard'.")

One episode in series 2 begins with a lengthy cold open of an initially straight scene from Juliet Bravo featuring actress Anna Carteret. Viewers are fooled into believing that the first few minutes of the programme are a Juliet Bravo episode, the illusion being broken only when one of her male colleagues appears not to "know what a woman is". Similar blending and bending of the boundaries of TV formats continues throughout the series.

== Memorable sketches ==
- Social Workers – the first sketch, per se, of the series. Description of various atrocities from history, Vlad the Impaler, Herod's Massacre of the Innocents etc. followed by interrogative journalism of English Nanny state social workers as to why they failed to take action on these events.
- Beauty Miss – personal beauty products, as used by George Bernard Shaw and Berthold Brecht
- Oscar Wilde's "The Noble Art of Verbal Abuse" – for protection against Millwall fans
- An interview with "Sir Freddy Krueger," new head of the English National Opera
- Joan Alone – Joan of Arc plugging her autobiography, record, etc., during interrogation
- Unemployment and Teletext – twin scourges of the 1990s
- Issues – A treatise on Islamic politics with waitresses Samantha, Tina, and Babs
- Hooray for British Films – a satirical attack on the then dire state of the British film industry
- A brigade of cowardly firemen who each suffer crippling phobias, such as Claustrophobia and Pyrophobia, that undermines their roles as firemen by preventing them from tackling a house fire – much to the house owner's frustration.
- International Olympic Committee looking round a council house in London with a view to staging the games inside it
- A drinks party with Triffids
- Firemen get dainty new uniforms and prance around like fashion models while out on the job
- Santa Claus : Polar Czar – World at War-style expose of Father Christmas as murderous dictator.
- Investigative journalists try to get an impromptu interview with God (Sayle) after hearing from various people who have each suffered comical misfortunes. God is portrayed as a reclusive man who 'moves in mysterious ways' by flailing around ridiculously as he walks.
- A Few Moments With Lord William Rees-Mogg – in episode 2 of series 3, on seven occasions throughout the show a photograph of Rees-Mogg was displayed on screen while Herb Alpert's The Swinger from Seville (burlesque-style music with an audience clearly audible in the background) was played over the top. After the first time it was shown, the BBC2 voiceover (Angus Deayton) apologised and assured the viewers at home that it would not happen again. It was then immediately brought back to the screen.
- A man who was decapitated and had to have an artificial head attached, in a documentary called "Man or Chess Piece?".
- Word Association – A music video for Sayle's eponymous 1985 song in which a game of word association gradually reveals his dirty mind to an attractive psychiatrist against his will. Despite initially being horrified and confused by Sayle's words, the psychiatrist ultimately falls in love with him.
- A spoof news broadcast detailing how Margaret Thatcher uses the TARDIS from Doctor Who to go back in time and visit a Black Plague clinic, then goes forward to visit an NHS hospital in the future, which looks exactly the same. She is quoted as saying that people should stop worrying about the Daleks exterminating people and instead focus on the opportunities they bring to the electronics industry.
- Most episodes in Series 3 feature the recurring character "Monsieur Aubergine", a mime artist who is part Mr. Bean and part Marcel Marceau.

== Home media releases ==
Three complete episodes were included in separate editions of BBC Video World, a fortnightly subscription-only service – primarily for expatriates – that delivered a three-hour selection of BBC programming on VHS cassettes:

- Vol. 1 No. 11 (August 1989) = Series 1 Episode 2
- Vol. 1 No. 16 (November 1989) = Series 1 Episode 6
- Vol. 1 No. 18 (December 1989) = Series 2 Episode 2

The Best of Alexei Sayle's Stuff, a 79 minute compilation featuring selected clips from the first two series, was released on VHS by BBC Video in 1990.

Series 1 was released on Region 2 DVD by 2entertain in 2005, followed by Series 2 and Series 3 in 2006. Each release was a single-disc edition containing the complete series, and no extra content. Only Series 2 was released on Region 4 DVD. As is common practice, certain sketches were omitted or truncated on the DVD releases, likely due to music licensing rights, or copyright issues. This included the removal of all of the linked "Michelin Film Awards" sketches from Series 2 Episode 2, which were complete on the BBC Video World release.

== Legacy ==
Alexei Sayle's Stuff was a critical success and a prelude to his 1994 series The All New Alexei Sayle Show, which was broadly similar in content and was likewise followed by Alexei Sayle's Merry-Go-Round in 1998.

== Sources ==
- Johnson RK, British TV Show Reviews
- "UK Comedy" on Memorable TV
