= List of The Comic Strip Presents... episodes =

The following is a list of episodes for the British comedy series The Comic Strip Presents..., created by the titular comedy troupe, which originally ran for three series and one special on Channel 4 from 1983 to 1988. Two series and three specials subsequently aired on BBC Two between 1990 and 1993. Since then, specials have aired sporadically on Channel 4, beginning in 1998 and most recently in 2016. The collective also created four theatrical films between 1985 and 2004. There have been a total of 42 television episodes, four feature films, and one short film.

== Short film (1981) ==
No. overall	No. in series	Title	Directed by	Written by	Original release date
—	—	"The Comic Strip"	Julien Temple	Arnold Brown, (Note: Additional writing) Adrian Edmondson, Dawn French, Rik Mayall, Nigel Planer, Peter Richardson, Jennifer Saunders, Alexei Sayle	1981
A semi-documentary in which Jennifer searches for her sister Dawn, who has run away from a Salvation Army shelter to join The Comic Strip in search of fame. Features sketches by Alexei Sayle, The Outer Limits, and The Dangerous Brothers. Cast: Arnold Brown, Adrian Edmondson, Dawn French, Rik Mayall, Nigel Planer, Peter Richardson, Jennifer Saunders, Alexei Sayle

== Series 1 (1982—83) ==
No. overall	No. in series	Title	Directed by	Written by	Original release date
1	1	"Five Go Mad in Dorset"	Bob Spiers	Peter Richardson, Pete Richens	2 November 1982
A parody of Enid Blyton's Famous Five books. The Famous Five report foreigners to the police, scold rude people, and investigate an old ruin. Cast: Ronald Allen, Robbie Coltrane, Sandra Dorne, Adrian Edmondson, Dawn French, Daniel Peacock, Peter Richardson, Jennifer Saunders
2	2	"War"	Bob Spiers	Peter Richardson, Pete Richens	3 January 1983
The year is 1985. Britain has been invaded by communists. Hermine and Godfrey retreat to their rural hide-away, but are separated. Cast: Robbie Coltrane, Adrian Edmondson, Dawn French, Rik Mayall, Daniel Peacock, Nigel Planer, Peter Richardson, Jennifer Saunders
3	3	"The Beat Generation"	Bob Spiers	Peter Richardson, Pete Richens	17 January 1983
August 1960. A bunch of weird beat poets assemble in a great villa by the sea to party like there is no tomorrow. Cast: Ronald Allen, Robbie Coltrane, Adrian Edmondson, Dawn French, Rik Mayall, Daniel Peacock, Nigel Planer, Peter Richardson, Jennifer Saunders
4	4	"Bad News Tour"	Sandy Johnson	Adrian Edmondson	24 January 1983
The heavy metal band "Bad News" goes on a small tour, only to fail miserably in the end. Cast: Adrian Edmondson, Dawn French, Rik Mayall, Nigel Planer, Peter Richardson, Jennifer Saunders
5	5	"Summer School"	Sandy Johnson	Dawn French	31 January 1983
A small band of suburbanites are to simulate life in an Iron Age village – in the middle of a modern university campus. Cast: Robbie Coltrane, Adrian Edmondson, Dawn French, Rik Mayall, Nigel Planer, Peter Richardson, Jennifer Saunders

== Series 2 (1983—84) ==
No. overall	No. in series	Title	Directed by	Written by	Original release date
6	1	"Five Go Mad on Mescalin"	Bob Spiers	Peter Richardson, Pete Richens	2 November 1983
A sequel to "Five Go Mad in Dorset", loosely based on Five on Finniston Farm. Cast: Ronald Allen, Robbie Coltrane, Adrian Edmondson, Dawn French, Daniel Peacock, Peter Richardson, Jennifer Saunders
7	2	"Dirty Movie"	Sandy Johnson	Adrian Edmondson, Rik Mayall	7 January 1984
Postman Bean wants to see The Sound of Muzak at his local cinema. Cinema manager Terry Toadstool is using this as a smoke screen to view a pornographic film. Bean's wife Monica, is the star. Cast: Robbie Coltrane, Adrian Edmondson, Dawn French, Rik Mayall, Daniel Peacock, Nigel Planer, Peter Richardson, Jennifer Saunders
8	3	"Susie"	Bob Spiers	Peter Richardson, Pete Richens	14 January 1984
School teacher Susie Darling is continually having affairs behind her husband's back. One day she meets romantic former pop star Garry Dreadful, who has moved to the village to start a traditional farm. Cast: Robbie Coltrane, Adrian Edmondson, Dawn French, Lanah P, (Note: Credited as Alan Pellay) Nigel Planer, Peter Richardson, Jennifer Saunders
9	4	"A Fistful of Travellers' Cheques"	Bob Spiers	Rik Mayall, Peter Richardson, Pete Richens	21 January 1984
Two students arrive in Spain dressed as gunslingers to live out their dream of being in a spaghetti Western. In the meantime, two Australian girls encounter a scruffy hitch-hicker and a dangerous matador. Cast: Keith Allen, Adrian Edmondson, Dawn French, Rik Mayall, Daniel Peacock, Nigel Planer, Peter Richardson, Jennifer Saunders
10	5	"Gino: Full Story and Pics"	Bob Spiers	Peter Richardson, Pete Richens	28 January 1984
A hoodlum is turned in to a celebrity when he steals a cab and subsequent events are blown out of proportion by the media. Cast: Ronald Allen, Arnold Brown, Robbie Coltrane, Adrian Edmondson, Dawn French, Rik Mayall, Lanah P, Daniel Peacock, Peter Richardson, Jennifer Saunders
11	6	"Eddie Monsoon – A Life?"	Sandy Johnson	Adrian Edmondson	4 February 1984
A documentary about the life of the violent drunken entertainer Eddie Monsoon. Cast: Adrian Edmondson, Dawn French, Peter Richardson, Jennifer Saunders
12	7	"Slags"	Sandy Johnson	Jennifer Saunders	11 February 1984
Teen-age gang leaders Passion and Little Sister are released from prison. Their gang the Slags have disbanded due to rival gang, the Hawaiians. Cast: Adrian Edmondson, Dawn French, Nigel Planer, Peter Richardson, Jennifer Saunders

== Specials and films (1984–87) ==
No. overall	No. in series	Title	Directed by	Written by	Original release date
13	—	"The Bullshitters: Roll Out the Gunbarrel"	Stephen Frears	Peter Richardson, Keith Allen	3 November 1984
A parody of The Professionals. When Commander Jackson, head of DI5, hears that his daughter Janie has been kidnapped and held for ransom, he has to call in ex-agents Bonehead and Foyle to save her. Cast: Keith Allen, Kevin Allen, Robbie Coltrane, Lanah P, (Note: Credited as Alana Pellay) Peter Richardson
—	—	"The Supergrass"	Peter Richardson	Peter Richardson, Pete Richens	November 1985
After returning from a holiday in the West Country, Dennis Carter tries to impress a girl by untruthfully boasting of being a drug smuggler. He is overheard by the police, who persuade him to become a supergrass and inform on his associates. The more Dennis lies, the bigger the dangers get. Cast: Keith Allen, Robbie Coltrane, Adrian Edmondson, Dawn French, Daniel Peacock, Lanah P, (Note: Credited as Lana Pellay) Nigel Planer, Peter Richardson, Jennifer Saunders, Alexei Sayle
14	—	"Consuela (or, The New Mrs Saunders)"	Stephen Frears	Dawn French, Jennifer Saunders	1 January 1986
A parody of Daphne du Maurier's Rebecca. Newlywed Jessica is tormented by an evil Spanish maid, Consuela. Main cast: Adrian Edmondson, Dawn French, Rik Mayall, Peter Richardson, Jennifer Saunders
15	—	"Private Enterprise"	Adrian Edmondson	Adrian Edmondson	2 January 1986
Small time crook Keith pockets a demo tape by newly disbanded group Toy Department. He takes it to a promoter who turns it into a chart hit. Complications arise when Brian wants a live tour. Cast: Adrian Edmondson, Dawn French, Rik Mayall, Nigel Planer, Peter Richardson, Jennifer Saunders
—	—	"Eat the Rich"	Peter Richardson	Peter Richardson, Pete Richens	17 August 1987
Long-suffering waiter Alex creates a high-end cannibalistic restaurant called Eat the Rich. Cast: Robbie Coltrane, Adrian Edmondson, Dawn French, Rik Mayall, Lanah P, (Note: Credited as Lanah Pellay) Nigel Planer, Miranda Richardson, Peter Richardson, Jennifer Saunders

== Series 3 (1988) ==
No. overall	No. in series	Title	Directed by	Written by	Original release date
16	1	"The Strike"	Peter Richardson	Peter Richardson, Pete Richens	20 February 1988
A Hollywood studio turns the story of the failed British Miner's Strike of 1984–85 into a romantic thriller starring Al Pacino. Cast: Keith Allen, Kevin Allen, Ronald Allen, Robbie Coltrane, Adrian Edmondson, Dawn French, Rik Mayall, Daniel Peacock, Nigel Planer, Peter Richardson, Jennifer Saunders, Alexei Sayle
17	2	"More Bad News"	Adrian Edmondson	Adrian Edmondson	27 February 1988
The members of "Bad News" reunite, this time with a record label behind them. They still fail miserably. Cast: Adrian Edmondson, Dawn French, Rik Mayall, Nigel Planer, Peter Richardson, Jennifer Saunders
18	3	"Mr. Jolly Lives Next Door"	Stephen Frears	Adrian Edmondson, Rik Mayall, Rowland Rivron	5 March 1988
A couple of bored escorts find themselves involved with a hit-gang and an ax-murderer – Mr. Jolly. Cast: Peter Cook, Adrian Edmondson, Dawn French, Rik Mayall, Nicholas Parsons, Peter Richardson, Jennifer Saunders
19	4	"The Yob"	Ian Emes	Keith Allen, Daniel Peacock	12 March 1988
Parody of The Fly (1986). A football hooligan and an avant-garde film director change personalities. Cast: Keith Allen, Adrian Edmondson, Peter Richardson
20	5	"Didn't You Kill My Brother?"	Bob Spiers	Pauline Melville, Alexei Sayle, David Stafford	19 March 1988
Carl Moss leaves jail a model prisoner, and gets community work teaching youngsters how to lead law-abiding lives. This displeases his brother Sterling, as he needs the young delinquents for his bicycle stealing ring. Cast: Alexei Sayle, Beryl Reid, Pauline Melville, Peter Richardson, Zoë Nathenson, Dexter Fletcher, Graham Crowden
21	6	"Funseekers"	Baz Taylor	Doug Lucie, Nigel Planer	26 March 1988
Tourists arrive in Ibiza for the 'funseekers' package holiday. Jamie is upset when the annoying Tony moves into his room. He gets his revenge when he discovers that Tony is too old to be part of the Club 18–30 clientele. Cast: Keith Allen, Kevin Allen, Kathy Burke, Nigel Planer, Peter Richardson, Hugh Cornwell

== Series 4 (1990) ==
No. overall	No. in series	Title	Directed by	Written by	Original release date
22	1	"South Atlantic Raiders"	Peter Richardson	Peter Richardson, Pete Richens	1 February 1990
Two security van personnel plan to rob a bank in an attempt to raise enough cash to mount a rescue mission when a dictator invades the Falklands. Cast: Kathy Burke, Robbie Coltrane, Adrian Edmondson, Dawn French, Lenny Henry, Nigel Planer, Peter Richardson, Jennifer Saunders
23	2	"South Atlantic Raiders: Argie Bargie!"	Peter Richardson	Peter Richardson, Pete Richens	7 February 1990
Stan has managed to make it to the Falklands, which have been taken over by the Argentinians. He is tied to a stake alongside Frances and are sentenced to death by dictator, General Galtieri. Stan recounts how he and his Raiders managed to make it all the way to the islands. Cast: Kevin Allen, Ronald Allen, Kathy Burke, Robbie Coltrane, Adrian Edmondson, Dawn French, Nigel Planer, Peter Richardson, Jennifer Saunders
24	3	"GLC: The Carnage Continues..."	Peter Richardson	Peter Richardson, Pete Richens	15 February 1990
Ken Livingstone, played by Charles Bronson, elected leader of the G.L.C., must prevent the evil Tories from flooding London in order to turn it into a yacht club. Cast: Keith Allen, Kevin Allen, Gary Beadle, Robbie Coltrane, Adrian Edmondson, Dawn French, Rik Mayall, Nigel Planer, Peter Richardson, Jennifer Saunders
25	4	"Oxford"	Peter Richardson	Peter Richardson, Pete Richens	22 February 1990
When an American comedian arrives in Oxford to make a film, his girlfriend Caroline goes behind his back to enroll in a poetry course. Meanwhile, Hannah Van Hosenstratt comes from New Orleans for the course and is tricked into believing she has a place by the dean, but the professor has other ideas. Cast: Ronald Allen, Adrian Edmondson, Dawn French, Lenny Henry, Nigel Planer, Peter Richardson, Jennifer Saunders
26	5	"Spaghetti Hoops"	Peter Richardson	Peter Richardson, Pete Richens	1 March 1990
In a monochrome city, banker Aldo Vini is on the run from Mafia boss Corelli, from whom he has embezzled two million. Corelli hires Mig and Mog, two inept hitmen to go after Vini, but when they catch up with him, they have no idea what to do. Cast: Keith Allen, Dawn French, Tim McInnerny, Nigel Planer, Peter Richardson, Jennifer Saunders, Alexei Sayle
27	6	"Les Dogs"	Peter Richardson	Peter Richardson, Pete Richens	8 March 1990
During a wedding reception, the families of the couple exchange insults and a gun battle ensues. Victor, who has wandered in on the scene, is asked to take wedding photographs and has a series of dreamlike fantasies all based around his infatuation with the bride. Cast: Keith Allen, Kevin Allen, Gary Beadle, Kate Bush, Adrian Edmondson, Tim McInnerny, Daniel Peacock, Miranda Richardson, Peter Richardson, Alexei Sayle

== Specials and film (1991–92) ==
No. overall	No. in series	Title	Directed by	Written by	Original release date
—	—	"The Pope Must Die"	Peter Richardson	Peter Richardson, Pete Richens	21 June 1991
A priest is mistakenly named the new pope. As the pontiff, he must deal with Vatican corruption, the Mob and the reappearance of his old lover. Cast: Robbie Coltrane, Annette Crosbie, Beverly D'Angelo, Adrian Edmondson, Herbert Lom, Peter Richardson, Alex Rocco, John Sessions
28	—	"Red Nose of Courage"	Peter Richardson	Peter Richardson, Pete Richens	9 April 1992
John Majer is useless as the circus clown, so he gets into politics. A few weeks later he becomes the Prime Minister. He still has to attend to his job as Coco the Clown. He falls in love with the leader of the opposition party, who falls in love with Coco the Clown. Cast: Keith Allen, Mark Caven, Phil Cornwell, Robbie Coltrane, Adrian Edmondson, Dawn French, Doon Mackichan, Rik Mayall, Nigel Planer, Peter Richardson, Jennifer Saunders, Alexei Sayle
29	—	"The Crying Game"	Keith Allen, Peter Richardson	Keith Allen, Peter Richardson	5 May 1992
The British tabloids are falling over themselves to report on the footballer Roy Brush after he scores for England in the European Cup Final, and saves a child's life. However, Brush has a deep secret – he is gay. The title is a reference to the movie The Crying Game, which starred Miranda Richardson, who also appeared in a few Comic Strip Presents... episodes. Cast: Keith Allen, Gary Beadle, Mark Caven, Phil Cornwell, Doon Mackichan, Nigel Planer, Peter Richardson
30	—	"Wild Turkey"	Peter Richardson	Peter Richardson, Pete Richens	24 December 1992
A New York cop brings home the last Christmas turkey in the shop for his wife Sue. Unfortunately they make a dramatic discovery – the turkey is not dead. Cast: Gary Beadle, Phil Cornwell, Peter Richardson, Jennifer Saunders, Ruby Wax

== Series 5 (1993) ==
No. overall	No. in series	Title	Directed by	Written by	Original release date
31	1	"Detectives on the Edge of a Nervous Breakdown"	Keith Allen, Peter Richardson	Keith Allen, Peter Richardson	22 April 1993
The star of 'The Gourmet Detective' is mysteriously murdered. Various detectives from 70's television shows team up with a television detective of the 90's to solve the crime. Cast: Keith Allen, Kevin Allen, Gary Beadle, Jim Broadbent, Mark Caven, Phil Cornwell, Doon Mackichan, Peter Richardson
32	2	"Space Virgins from Planet Sex"	Keith Allen, Peter Richardson	Peter Richardson, Pete Richens	29 April 1993
A group of sexy female aliens travel to Earth in order to enslave men to impregnate them. Only the non-feminist agent James Blond can save the day. Cast: Keith Allen, Kevin Allen, Gary Beadle, Mark Caven, Robbie Coltrane, Phil Cornwell, Adrian Edmondson, Dawn French, Doon Mackichan, Miranda Richardson, Peter Richardson, Jennifer Saunders
33	3	"Queen of the Wild Frontier"	Peter Richardson	Peter Richardson, Pete Richens	6 May 1993
Two convicts escape their prison van, and end up at a remote farmhouse belonging to the sex-starved sisters Finoa and Susie. Cast: Gary Beadle, Jack Docherty, Josie Lawrence, Peter Richardson, Alexei Sayle, Julie T. Wallace
34	4	"Gregory: Diary of a Nutcase"	Peter Richardson	Peter Richardson, Pete Richens	13 May 1993
A parody of The Silence of the Lambs. Cast: Keith Allen, Mark Caven, Phil Cornwell, Adrian Edmondson, Doon Mackichan, Nigel Planer, Peter Richardson
35	5	"Demonella"	Paul Bartel	Paul Bartel, Barry Dennen	20 May 1993
A music composer makes a deal with the devil. She produces a smash hit for him, and he gives her his mother's recipe for Chicken Soup. Cast: Keith Allen, Robbie Coltrane, Adrian Edmondson, Nigel Planer, Miranda Richardson, Peter Richardson, Jennifer Saunders
36	6	"Jealousy"	Robbie Coltrane	Robbie Coltrane, Morag Fullarton	27 May 1993
John Pettigrew is insanely jealous of his wife Jane Margory. He is convinced she is having an affair behind his back. Cast: Kevin Allen, Gary Beadle, Kathy Burke, Robbie Coltrane, Nigel Planer, Miranda Richardson, Peter Richardson, Jennifer Saunders, Peter Capaldi

== Specials and films (1998–2016) ==
No. overall	No. in series	Title	Directed by	Written by	Original release date
37	—	"Four Men in a Car"	Peter Richardson	Peter Richardson, Pete Richens	12 April 1998
Four salesmen travel to Swindon for a potential promotion. On the way, everything goes wrong. Cast: Adrian Edmondson, Dawn French, Rik Mayall, Nigel Planer, Peter Richardson, Jennifer Saunders
38	—	"Four Men in a Plane"	Peter Richardson	Peter Richardson, Pete Richens	4 January 2000
The four salesmen are in North Africa for another conference. They decide to hire a private plane, only to be stranded in the desert. Cast: Adrian Edmondson, Rik Mayall, Nigel Planer, Peter Richardson
—	—	"Churchill: The Hollywood Years"	Peter Richardson	Peter Richardson, Pete Richens	3 December 2004
A Hollywood studio tells the story of Winston Churchill in a completely new way. Cast: Phil Cornwell, Harry Enfield, Rik Mayall, Leslie Phillips, Bob Mortimer, Vic Reeves, Alistair McGowan, Miranda Richardson, Neve Campbell, Antony Sher, Christian Slater
39	—	"Sex Actually"	Peter Richardson	Peter Richardson, Pete Richens	28 December 2005
Colombian Luccio and his girlfriend Angie move into a house in Berkshire, learning that Ron and Helen, the previous owners of their house, died mysteriously. They suspect their neighbours, who are all sex-addicts. Cast: Phil Cornwell, Doon Mackichan, Rik Mayall, Nigel Planer, Peter Richardson, Sheridan Smith
40	—	"The Hunt for Tony Blair"	Peter Richardson	Peter Richardson, Pete Richens	14 October 2011
The police are coming to arrest prime minister Tony Blair for murder. This is because he allowed himself to be abducted by a thug called George Bush and collude in murdering a bunch of Afghans. Cast: Robbie Coltrane, Harry Enfield, Rik Mayall, Stephen Mangan, Nigel Planer, Peter Richardson, Jennifer Saunders, James Buckley
41	—	"Five Go to Rehab"	Peter Richardson	Peter Richardson, Pete Richens	7 November 2012
The Famous Five are reunited on Dick's birthday in leafy Dorset after 30 years. Cast: Robbie Coltrane, Adrian Edmondson, Dawn French, Stephen Mangan, Rik Mayall, Daniel Peacock, Nigel Planer, Peter Richardson, Jennifer Saunders
42	—	"Redtop"	Peter Richardson	Birgit Grant, Peter Richardson, Pete Richens	20 January 2016
A satirical take on the phone hacking scandal that brought down one of Britain's biggest tabloid newspapers – The News Of The World. Cast: James Buckley, Harry Enfield, Stephen Mangan, Sidney Mayall, Steven O'Donnell, Maxine Peake, Nigel Planer, Peter Richardson, Alexei Sayle, John Sessions, Russell Tovey, Johnny Vegas, Mark Williams
