= Eddie Monsoon =

Eddie Monsoon may refer to:

- Jennifer Saunders' character in Absolutely Fabulous
- Ade Edmondson's character in The Comic Strip Presents...
