= The Yob =

- The Comic Strip Presents... episode
- Episode no.: Series 3 Episode 4
- Directed by: Ian Emes
- Written by: Keith Allen; Daniel Peacock
- Original air date: 12 March 1988
- Running time: 55 minutes

Episode chronology
← Previous "Mr. Jolly Lives Next Door"	Next → "Didn't You Kill My Brother?"

"The Yob" is the 21st episode of the British television comedy series The Comic Strip Presents..., written by Keith Allen and Daniel Peacock, with Allen also in the title role, and was directed by Ian Emes. It was first screened on Channel 4 on 12 March 1988 and also stars Adrian Edmondson and Peter Richardson.

It features a brief appearance by Lily Allen, Keith's daughter, then a toddler, and subsequently a pop star.

In the story, pretentious music video director Patrick Church (Keith Allen) is at UB40 concert, where he inadvertently steps into a matter-transportation pod, believing it to be a portable toilet. His brain patterns and those of a football hooligan are transposed and he turns into an ape-like Arsenal supporter to comic effect.
