= GLC: The Carnage Continues... =

"GLC: The Carnage Continues" is an episode of the British television comedy series The Comic Strip Presents... broadcast on BBC2 in 1990. It parodied a Hollywood telling of the 1980s takeover of the Greater London Council by Ken Livingstone and the subsequent disbanding of that body by Prime Minister Margaret Thatcher, re-imagining the story as a Charles Bronson / Sylvester Stallone-style action movie. It is a spiritual successor to The Strike, which involved the creation of a Hollywood version of the 1984 miners' strike.

== Cast ==
- Robbie Coltrane – Charles Bronson as Ken Livingstone
- Dawn French – Cher as Joan Ruddock
- Jennifer Saunders – Brigitte Nielsen as the Ice Maiden (a parody of Margaret Thatcher)
- Rik Mayall – The deposed Lord Mayor of the City of London
- Adrian Edmondson – Charles, Prince of Wales, Giles "Cricket Bat" Portland
- Peter Richardson – Lee Van Cleef as Tony Benn
- Leslie Phillips – Sir Horace Cutler
- Keith Allen – gay councillor / 1st Beefeater
- Steven O'Donnell (actor) – Alderman "Crazy" James Fairchild.

French, Saunders, Richardson and Edmondson also make cameo appearances as themselves.

== Plot ==
The story opens as a mock report from the opening of the new Charles Bronson movie GLC: The Carnage Continues, in which Bronson (played by Coltrane) discusses his new movie, in which he plays Ken Livingstone. From there, the movie itself begins.

== Music ==
Kate Bush wrote and performed the instrumental score and theme song to the episode. The lyrics include the line "Who's the man we all need? Ken! Who's a funky sex machine? Ken!" In a 2014 show for LBC, Livingstone said "I don't know if you'll be applying for tickets to go to Kate Bush's new tour, but don't forget, she did one great song – "Ken Is The Leader of the GLC" [sic] – which I've still got at home. It's very good."

The song appeared as an extra track on her 1990 single "Love and Anger" along with "The Confrontation" and "One Last Look Around the House before We Go...", short extracts from Bush's instrumental score to the episode. The soundtrack also features the 12" version of Bush's 1985 hit single "Running Up That Hill", and an extract from "Waking the Witch" taken from the 1985 Hounds of Love album.
