= South Atlantic Raiders =

- Directed by: Peter Richardson
- Written by: Peter Richardson; Pete Richens
- Produced by: Lolli Kimpton
- Starring: Nigel Planer; Adrian Edmondson; Dawn French; Jennifer Saunders; Robbie Coltrane; Peter Richardson; Kathy Burke; Derren Nesbitt
- Release date: 1 February 1990

South Atlantic Raiders is a two-part 1990 comedy film made for British television as part of The Comic Strip Presents... series and was originally broadcast on BBC 2. It is a satire of the Falklands War.

== Plot ==
=== Part One ===
The story revolves around Stan (Planer), a lonely and not-very-intelligent Midlands security van driver and ham radio enthusiast who strikes up a long-distance romance with Frances (French), an ornithologist on expedition to the Falklands with Kathy (Saunders), a lazier woman she detests immensely. One night while trying to contact her, Stan hears the sounds of a violent altercation and becomes convinced that the island is under attack and that Frances' life is in danger.

After his attempts to report his concerns to the police are rebuffed, he and his military-obsessed best friend Billy (Edmondson) decide to rescue her themselves, and hatch a plot to rob a bank that is on their route to finance their expedition. They break into the house of the manager, Max (Coltrane), an alcoholic with a crumbling marriage, and hold his wife Mary (Burke) hostage until he opens the vault and gives them the money; unfortunately, the bank vault has a time lock, meaning it cannot be opened until the next morning and forcing the two would-be robbers to stay overnight. As a consequence, they strike up a friendship with Max, try to help him bond with his wife by cooking them dinner, and thwart the attempts of Rollo (Richardson), a smooth-talking burglar, to steal from him.

Rollo is persuaded to join the bank heist and Max, having been fired from his job and with nothing left to lose, throws his lot in with the robbers as well. The robbery goes well, but their attempt to purchase a jet from British Aerospace to get to the Falklands ends with everyone except Stan arrested and sent to Dartmoor. Resolving to get them out, Stan learns from the widow of an ex-convict that there is an unused tunnel dug as part of a failed escape attempt that has never been discovered leading from Cell 109b to the outside world.

On learning this, at his request Billy is moved into the cell with the tunnel, only to discover too late that it is now also occupied by Randy Ron, a violent prison rapist, while Rollo and Max are moved into the cell next door, a scene of horrific squalor. Breaking into Billy's cell, they rescue Billy from Ron as Stan arrives to lead them through the tunnel to freedom, and the episode ends with the main characters fleeing Dartmoor in an ice cream van.

=== Part Two: Argie Bargie! ===
The episode opens with Stan and Frances facing an Argentinian firing squad before General Galtieri (Nesbitt), about to be executed as spies. It transpires that while Stan's initial impression of Frances' life being in danger was mistaken, there was in fact an Argentinian military force hiding on the island, preparing to retake the Falkland Islands. Stan manages to get a stay of execution by telling Galtieri and his men the story of how he reached that point; after the escape from Dartmoor, Stan and his accomplices sneaked about a passenger jet heading to Vancouver by pretending to be the crew, Max having had some limited experience in flying Cessna aircraft "before my first breakdown."

Once in flight, Max is surprised to discover Mary aboard, intending to move to Canada and start a new life; he resolves to try and win her back. After numerous set-backs and calamities on the way, the plane is safely landed on a beach on the island, and Stan and Billy set off to find Frances. They instead find Kathy, who has attacked Frances and left her on the rocky cliffs to die—however, having previously mistaken her for Frances, Stan is unaware of the difference, and Kathy begins to seduce him. Discovering evidence that she is not Frances, Stan confronts her; Kathy reveals herself to be both an Argentinian agent and Galtieri's lover and attacks him. Fighting her off, Stan escapes and discovers Frances on the cliff-edge. While he manages to rescue her, they are discovered by the Argentinians and captured. Billy, having left Stan and Kathy alone to give them some privacy, discovers the Argentinian forces.

Stan concludes his narrative by proposing marriage to Frances, who accepts. Galtieri mocks Stan's story, before suddenly collapsing; Max has infiltrated the Argentinian base posing as a cook and has fed him a poisoned omelette. Billy at that point attacks the camp wearing a Ned Kelly-style suit of armour and firing flare guns at the Argentinians, while Rollo and Mary stage an attack by British forces. Kathy, distraught over Galtieri's death, commits suicide and the Argentinians flee in disarray. Having thwarted the invasion, the group return to Britain as heroes and it is revealed that in light of their actions the Home Secretary has commuted the thirty-year prison sentence that Stan, Billy, Max and Rollo were facing into a sentence of "one year at an easy prison".

== Music ==
The soundtrack of the episodes is largely composed of excerpts from tracks on Jeff Beck's 1989 studio album Jeff Beck's Guitar Shop. Beck also appears in the episode in a brief cameo role as himself.

== Cast ==
- Nigel Planer as Stan
- Adrian Edmondson as Billy
- Dawn French as Frances
- Jennifer Saunders as Kathy
- Robbie Coltrane as Max
- Peter Richardson as Rollo
- Kathy Burke as Mary
- Lenny Henry as Prison Warden
- Derren Nesbitt as General Galtieri
- Ron Tarr as Randy Ron
