= Bad News (Bad News album) =

Studio album by Bad News
- Released: October 1987
- Recorded: Sarm Studios
- Genres: Heavy metal, parody music, comedy rock
- Length: 23:43
- Label: EMI
- Producers: Brian May, Vim Fuego

Bad News chronology
Bad News (1987)	Bootleg (1988)

Singles from Bad News
- 1. "Bohemian Rhapsody" Released: September 1987

Professional ratings
Review scores
Source	Rating
AllMusic	4/5 stars

Bad News is the debut album from British parody heavy metal group Bad News released in October 1987 by EMI. The album features a cover of the Queen song "Bohemian Rhapsody" and was produced by Queen's guitarist Brian May. "Bohemian Rhapsody" was released as a single along with music video created for it, written and directed by Adrian Edmondson, who portrays Vim Fuego in the group. The video was released as a video single by Picture Music International. In 2004, EMI re-released the album with a re-ordered track listing and with additions of tracks derived from the group's follow-up album The Cash In Compilation.

== Track listing ==
=== Original release ===
Side 1

1. "Hey, Hey, Bad News" 5:22 (Vim Fuego)
2. "Warriors of Ghengis Khan" 3:27 (Fuego)
3. "Bohemian Rhapsody" (Freddie Mercury) 3:46

Side 2

1. "Bad News" 3:11 (Fuego)
2. "Masturbike" 2:20 (Dennis)
3. "Drink Till I Die" 5:26 (Dennis)

=== 1989 Rhino Records release ===
1. "Bad Dreams Rehearsal" 5:13
2. "A.G.M." 4:24
3. "Introducing The Band" 2:19
4. "Bad News" 3:11
5. "Hey, Mr. Bassman" 2:00
6. "Hey, Mr. Drummer" 2:15
7. "Masturbike" 2:20
8. "Trousers" 3:49
9. "Drink Till I Die" 5:26
10. "Vim Is Angry" 2:09
11. "Hey, Hey, Bad News" 5:22
12. "Warriors Of Ghengis Khan" 3:27
13. "Excaliber" 6:21 †
14. "Bohemian Rhapsody" 3:46
15. "Double Entendre" 3:35 †
16. "Cashing In On Christmas" 4:09
17. "Dividing Up The Spoils" 2:59

† indicates a track exclusive to the CD edition of the album.

=== 2004 re-release ===
1. "Hey, Hey, Bad News" - 5:16
2. "We Haven't Recorded Anything Yet" - 2:03
3. "Warriors of Ghengis Kahn" - 3:25
4. "Excalibur" - 6:21
5. "Bohemian Rhapsody (Take 1)(Part)" - 1:30
6. "Bohemian Rhapsody" - 3:39
7. "The Contract" - 2:59
8. "Introducing the Band" - 2:00
9. "Bad News" - 3:35
10. "Hey, Mr Bassman" - 4:08
11. "Masturbike" - 2:20
12. "What Are You Going to Wear for Top of the Pops?" - 3:48
13. "Drink Till I Die" - 3:35
14. "Maybe We Should Plug the Guitars In" - 1:46
15. "Pretty Woman" - 2:51
16. "Life with Brian" - 5:25 (Ade Edmondson And Brian May)
17. "Bad Dreams" - 4:15
18. "A.G.M." - 4:22
19. "O'Levels" - 3:24
20. "Double Entendre" 3:33
21. "Cashing In On Christmas" (Dub) - 4:26
22. "Cashing In On Christmas" - 4:07

== Personnel ==
=== Bad News ===
- Vim Fuego (aka Alan Metcalfe) - vocals, lead guitar, bass on "Warriors of Ghengis Khan"
- Den Dennis - rhythm guitar
- Colin Grigson - bass
- Spider Webb - drums

== Additional personnel ==
- Brian May - Guitar on "Bad News", "Pretty Woman", "Drink Till I Die", "Life with Brian", "Cashing In on Christmas"

== Production ==
- Produced By Brian May & Vim Fuego
- Engineered By Pete Schwier
- Re-Mastering By Bill Inglot & Ken Perry
