= Ron Tarr =

British actor (1936–1997)

- Born: Ronald Lawrence Morisco-Tarr; 14 November 1936; Willesden, Middlesex, England
- Died: 20 October 1997 (aged 60); Rickmansworth, Hertfordshire, England
- Occupation: Actor
- Years active: 1973–1997

Ronald Lawrence Morisco-Tarr, known as Ron Tarr (14 November 1936 – 20 October 1997) was a British actor who played minor roles in television series and films.

His first acting role was in the film Carry On Girls in 1973, where he played an uncredited part as a Bearded Audience Member. This was followed by appearances in several television series such as Doctor Who, Blake's 7, Are You Being Served?, Return of the Saint, The Gentle Touch, The Comic Strip Presents – (Five Go Mad in Dorset, South Atlantic Raiders), Dear John and Dramarama. He also appeared in films such as the James Bond film A View to a Kill (1985), Eat the Rich (1987) and Willow (1988).

He was perhaps best known as the background character Big Ron in the BBC soap opera EastEnders. He portrayed Big Ron from the show's inception in 1985 until just before his death in October 1997. While his character had few central storylines, he was often seen interacting with the main characters. After his death, he appeared in pre-recorded episodes filmed before his death. To explain the absence of his character, Big Ron was written out of the series in early 1998 through a storyline in which he won the lottery and moved to Spain.

Tarr also featured in a series of 1980s television advertisements for Do It All, a now-defunct DIY chain in the United Kingdom. In 1990, he appeared in an advert for Sugar Puffs; where he was running a fairground stall.

On 20 October 1997, Tarr died of cancer at the age of 60. He was a market trader in his off-screen life, running a stall in Southall market selling household appliance spares.

== Filmography ==
Year	Title	Role	Notes
1973	Carry On Girls	Bearded Audience Member	Uncredited
1977	Star Wars	Jabba's henchman	Uncredited
1985	A View to a Kill	Guard I	
1987	Eat the Rich	Ron	
1988	Vroom	Mr. Roache (The Fat Man)	
1988	Willow	Llug	
1990	South Atlantic Raiders	Ron	
