= Bad News (band) =

Fictional English heavy metal band

- Bad News in a scene from More Bad News. From left to right; Colin Grigson, Spider Webb, Vim Fuego, Den Dennis.

Background information
- Origin: United Kingdom
- Genres: Heavy metal, parody music, comedy rock, New Romantic
- Years active: 1983–1988
- Label: EMI
- Past members: Vim Fuego; Den Dennis; Colin Grigson; Spider Webb

Bad News are a fictional English heavy metal band created for the Channel 4 television series The Comic Strip Presents.... Its members were Vim Fuego (played by Ade Edmondson) on vocals and lead guitar; Den Dennis (Nigel Planer) on rhythm guitar; Colin Grigson (Rik Mayall) on bass; and Spider "Eight-Legs" Webb (Peter Richardson) on drums. The band continued outside the context of the TV series, with the actors (in character) eventually playing a number of live gigs as Bad News, and recording an album (1987's Bad News) and a single (a cover of "Bohemian Rhapsody") that made the UK charts.

== Biography ==
=== Early incarnation: "Bad News Tour" (1983) ===
Bad News made their television debut during 1983, in the first series of The Comic Strip Presents... (written by Edmondson, and produced by Michael White/Comic Strip Productions). The episode, "Bad News Tour", took the form of a satirical fly-on-the-wall rockumentary, in which the incompetent band is followed travelling to a gig in Grantham, by an almost equally inept documentary film crew: it seemed to take much inspiration from Mark Kidel's 1976 BBC documentary So You Wanna Be a Rock 'n' Roll Star? that followed the Kursaal Flyers around Scotland and northeast England. In the episode, Bad News is a band just starting out; they have no recording contract, no management, no crew, and have apparently only been together for a short while. The 30-minute documentary follows them on their "tour" (apparently only one gig), which is an unqualified disaster: only four people show up. Along the way, there is much inter-group squabbling as Bad News are profiled by "rock journalist extraordinaire" Sally Freidman (Jennifer Saunders), and pick up a schoolgirl groupie named Tracy (Dawn French). The episode was filmed in autumn 1982 and was coincidentally in production at the same time as the similar mock-documentary This Is Spinal Tap, which was released in 1984 to a much wider audience.

The "Bad News Tour" episode is notable for featuring songs (written by Edmondson and Simon Brint) that do not appear on either of the Bad News albums or in the later TV episodes. These rare tunes are "Bad News" (Version 1), "The Motorbike Song" (a.k.a. "Doing a Ton Down the Highway"), a brief snippet of a song whose title is unknown, and an almost complete live version of "Mr Rock N Roll". These tunes represent the only released Bad News material not co-produced by the Queen guitarist, Brian May.

The opening sequence of "Bad News Tour" shows Vim living in the notorious Chantry Point tower block on the Elgin Estate in west London. The block was demolished in 1992.

=== Revival: Monsters of Rock (1986), Bad News (1987), "More Bad News" (1988) and Bootleg (1988) ===
After a pause of a few years, the previously fictional-only band became an entity in real life when Bad News were invited to play at the Monsters of Rock festival at Castle Donington in 1986. A feature of the band's on-stage antics that day was a method of coping with the crowd's plastic (and often urine-filled) bottle barrage, which was then a traditional (if somewhat awkward) welcome for bands playing at the festival in those days. Before the performance began properly, the band spent time just running around on stage dodging missiles, with Mayall using his guitar as a bat in an attempt to return some. They also played a low-key London show at the Marquee Club, with guest appearances by Jeff Beck and Brian May, and several other gigs, including opening for Iron Maiden and a show with a guest appearance from Jimmy Page.

All this was in aid of promoting an eponymously titled Bad News album, consisting of thrashy rock songs punctuated by frequent squabbling amongst the band's members. Brian May produced the record, which included a cover version of Queen's "Bohemian Rhapsody". That track peaked at No. 44 in the UK Singles Chart in September 1987. A 1987 UK tour was put on, with May appearing during the encores.

The band's performance at the Monsters of Rock festival was the centre piece of a follow-up Comic Strip episode, "More Bad News", broadcast by Channel 4 in 1988. In this one-hour mock-documentary, the band is once again profiled by "rock journalist extraordinaire" Sally Freidman (Jennifer Saunders); Dawn French plays a different character this time, the band's manager Rachel. It is explained that Bad News "broke up" in 1983, six months after the original documentary was filmed, due to extreme personality conflicts. (A snippet of a supposed 1983 appearance on The Tube is shown, with Bad News being interviewed by Jools Holland before it devolves into a screaming match.) Five years later, the band is put back together again at Freidman's instigation, and now has an opportunity to record a song ("Warriors of Ghengis Khan") and make a video for it. Behind-the-scenes footage of the recording and video shoot are shown, but the single flops, and the band is in debt to their record company ("Frilly Pink Records") when the opportunity to play the Monsters of Rock festival comes along. In the film, highlights from the concert are shown, but it ends with Bad News' terrible performance causing a riot, and the members of Bad News being beaten mercilessly by the crowd and by the police. The documentary ends with all four members of Bad News in hospital, severely injured. Dennis (the only band member still actually capable of speech) muses that if Vim dies from his injuries and they market it properly, the band might be successful yet.

Bad News appeared at the 1987 Reading Festival and were joined onstage by Brian May for a performance of "Bohemian Rhapsody".

Later in 1988, the band issued the largely spoken word album Bootleg, which ostensibly consisted of dialogue (mostly interband arguments) recorded during the sessions for Bad News. In 1989, a CD reissue of the Bad News album combined tracks from both albums; the later Cash In Compilation (1992) compiled many of the same tracks.

=== Later activity ===
In 2012, for the 30 Years of Comic Strip documentary, Planer and Richardson returned as Den Dennis and Spider Webb respectively to recall stories from their time as Bad News. In the documentary, the post-1988 fates of the Bad News members were revealed: Alan (Vim) returned to his business as a painter and decorator, with Den assisting him; Colin's father got him a job as a bank clerk; and Spider retired to the West Country with his partner and three children. It's also revealed that Vim and Sally eventually married—just as their portrayers Adrian Edmondson and Jennifer Saunders were married in real life.

In 2019, a vinyl record of Bad News rarities (Almost Rare) appeared. The following year, the band issued a 2-CD live compilation of material recorded in 1986, including a complete gig at the Hammersmith Odeon and their Monsters Of Rock show live at Donington.

== Discography ==
- 1987 – Bad News (UK No. 69)
- 1988 – Bootleg
- 1989 – Bad News (expanded reissue)
- 1992 – The Cash in Compilation
- 2004 – Bad News (re-release on EMI International)

During the "A.G.M." sketch, their upcoming album is the provisionally entitled Satan Ate My Knob. During "Cashing in on Christmas", Colin states that as a band they have released 17 singles so far.

=== Bootleg ===
Bootleg

Live album by Bad News
- Released: 1988
- Recorded: Sarm Studios, London
- Genres: Heavy metal, parody music, comedy rock
- Label: EMI
- Producer: Adrian Edmondson

Bad News chronology
Bad News (1987)	Bootleg (1988)	The Cash in Compilation (1993)

Bootleg is the second album release by UK parody heavy metal group Bad News. It is a comedy album, apparently a bootleg of outtakes from the sessions for the group's debut album Bad News. The first album features music and some arguing between the band members; this album is almost entirely arguing. Tracks are:

1. "Bad Dreams"
2. "A.G.M."
3. "Double Entendre"
4. "Locked In"
5. "AIDS"
6. "O' Levels"
7. "Wedding"
8. "Heavy Metal Farmer"
9. "Making of Masturbike"
10. "Cashing In on Christmas" (DUB)

== Videography ==
- 1988: Bohemian Rhapsody (contains the music video for the title track and a skit entitled "EMI: Every Mistake Imaginable")
- 1988: More Bad News (The Comic Strip Presents... S03E02)
- 1983: Bad News Tour (The Comic Strip Presents... S01E04)

== Band members ==
- Vim Fuego, né Alan Metcalfe (Ade Edmondson) – Lead vocals and lead electric guitar
- Den Dennis (Nigel Planer) – Rhythm electric guitar and backing vocals
- Colin Grigson (Rik Mayall) – Electric bass guitar, backing vocals and crying
- Spider Webb (Peter Richardson) – Drum kit and backing vocals
