= Blood (2000 film) =

- Directed by: Charly Cantor
- Written by: Charly Cantor
- Produced by: Simon Markham
- Starring: Adrian Rawlins; Lee Blakemore; Phil Cornwell
- Cinematography: Katie Swain
- Edited by: Nick Packer
- Music by: Vince Clarke
- Release date: 2000
- Country: United Kingdom
- Language: English

Blood is a 2000 horror film directed and written by Charly Cantor and starring Adrian Rawlins, Lee Blakemore, and Phil Cornwell.

== Premise ==
A doctor who engineered a woman with narcotic blood encounters his creation 20 years later and falls in love with her.

== Reception ==
JoBlo.com gave the film 8/10 in their review. Author Clive Davies also found the film enjoyable, stating that it was slow and talk heavy but with several interesting ideas. It was also reviewed by author Stephen Jones.

== See also ==
- Cinema of the United Kingdom
- Vampire films
