= Radio Norwich =

Fictional radio station

The Radio Norwich logo, as seen in the first series of I'm Alan Partridge.

Radio Norwich is a fictional radio station in Norwich, England, in the television series I'm Alan Partridge. It parodies elements from both BBC Local Radio and Independent Local Radio.

The title character, played by Steve Coogan, can be seen on-air at the beginning of several episodes, usually hosting phone ins on various inane topics (for example: "Which is the best Lord: Lord of the Rings, of the Dance, or of the Flies?") Partridge can also often be seen bickering with DJ Dave Clifton (played by Phil Cornwell), who takes the slots after his own in both series of the show.

In real-life, Norwich and Norfolk are served by BBC Radio Norfolk. A real-life commercial radio station named 99.9 Radio Norwich launched on 29 June 2006. It closed on 1 September 2020 when it was replaced by Greatest Hits Radio.

== Radio shows ==
Alan hosts different radio shows on each of the two series. In the first series he hosts an early morning slot, Up With The Partridge (4 am – 7 am), whilst in the second series he hosts Norfolk Nights (10 pm – 1 am). Each of his shows in both series were followed by Dave Clifton's two shows, The Breakfast Show and Dave Clifton's Nightclub. In series two, Alan claims he has "the third best slot" on Radio Norwich. A point he also makes several times during the second series is that he also hosts Skirmish, a military-based general knowledge quiz show on digital cable television channel UK Conquest. He also goes on to say that the show "boasts the largest audience share of a daytime digital channel at that time of day, in the Norfolk area".

Elements in his radio shows included:

- Super Talk (brought to you by Ginsters pasties)
- Alan's Deep Bath (brought to you by Dettol)
- Alan's Fact of the Day
- Cock-a-Doodle-Who?

== Filming locations ==
The exterior of Radio Norwich is the offices of UBC Media Group at 50 Lisson Street, London. Alan's studio is UBC's radio production studio on the first floor of the building. This studio (which had subsequently been refurbished) was also used for the filming of Alan's later series Mid-Morning Matters.
