= Red Richardson =

English stand-up comedian

Red Richardson is an English stand-up comedian, actor and podcaster.

== Early life ==
Richardson was born in Camberwell, London and attended Lyndhurst Primary School. He then moved to Devon at the age of ten where he attended King Edward VI Community College.

Richardson has explained on stage that 'Red' is not a stage name but a consequence of his parents watching Clint Eastwood in For a Few Dollars More shortly after his birth.

== Career ==
=== Stand up ===
Richardson performed his first stand up gig in 2014 and rapidly rose up the ranks of the UK comedy circuit. In 2015 he was a finalist in the So You Think You're Funny? competition. Richardson made his Edinburgh Fringe Festival one-man show debut in 2018 with the show Seeing Red, which he described as largely autobiographical and about growing up in a small “hippy town”.

Richardson returned to the Edinburgh Festival with his show Shots Fired in 2022. The show, in part, detailed his involvement in the 2017 Oxford Circus panic. In 2023 he started posting his 'Stay Toxic' sketches on Instagram which in under a year gained 100 million views; by late 2025 the sketches had exceeded 200 million views. His Instagram success saw him perform a US tour in June 2024, and embark on his debut UK tour in September 2024. In December 2025, Richardson was named one of twenty stand-up comedians to watch in 2026 by the trade publication Deadline. In April 2026, he made his debut on the American talk show The Tonight Show Starring Jimmy Fallon, performing a stand-up set.

=== Podcast ===
In February 2021, Richardson launched comedy news podcast Laughable with Jayde Adams and Garrett Millerick. It was described by Sarah Keyworth in The Guardian as “great comedy minds telling bizarre tales, sprinkled with just the right amount of sweary bickering”. In December 2021, he started co-hosting comedy-history podcast The Year Is alongside Bobby Mair.

=== Acting ===
Richardson has said in interviews and on stage that as a child he auditioned for the role of Harry Potter, reaching far enough along in the process to be included in one-on-one auditions with Harry Potter and the Philosopher's Stone director Chris Columbus, with the role ultimately going to Daniel Radcliffe.

Richardson has appeared in advertising campaigns for Dr. Squatch grooming products and the 32Red online casino.

== Personal life ==
Richardson is the son of director and screenwriter Peter Richardson. In his teenage years when he lived in Devon, Richardson's family's neighbours included comedian Rik Mayall, who was a family friend.

In 2021, Richardson married Rosie Mayall, Rik's daughter. They live in London, where she works as a manager at a Soho restaurant.
