= Ian Emes =

British artist and film director (1949–2023)

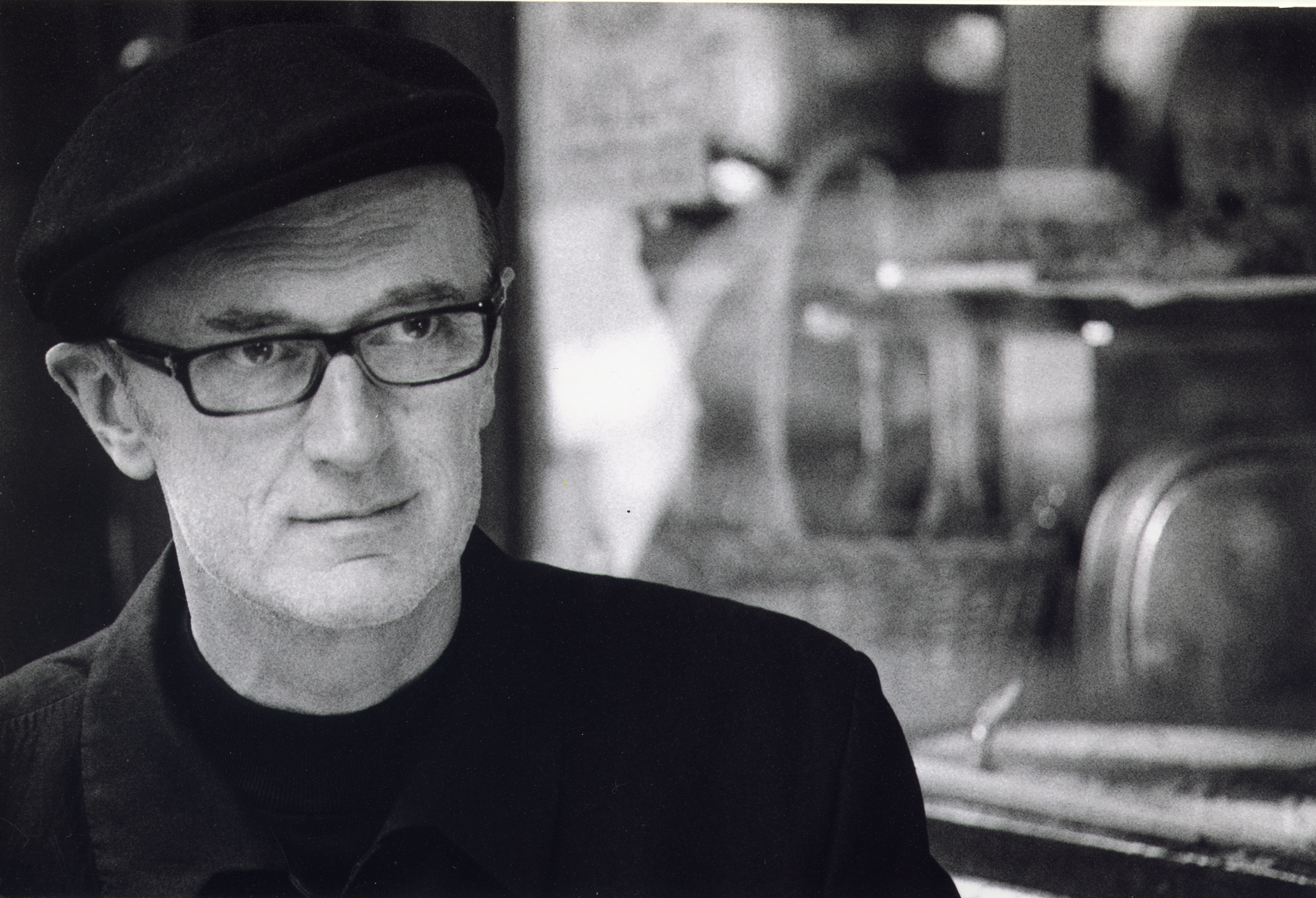
- Emes in 2005
- Born: Ian Ronald Emes; 17 August 1949; Birmingham, England
- Died: 16 July 2023 (aged 73)
- Awards: British Academy Award (3); Palme d'Or Award; Oscar nomination
- Patrons: Pink Floyd
- Ian Emes's voice recorded January 2014
- Website: ianemes.com

Ian Ronald Emes (17 August 1949 – 16 July 2023) was a British artist and film director. He is known for using innovative and experimental film techniques, and for being Pink Floyd's original animator.

Emes' animations have featured in major exhibitions, including Pink Floyd: Their Mortal Remains at the V&A (2017) and the National Film Theatre Retrospective (1980). His works have also been used in live music tours, such as Roger Waters Us + Them (2017), David Gilmour Live at the Royal Albert Hall (2016) and Mike Oldfield In Concert (1980). He is the winner of three BAFTA Awards (1994, 2009, 2011), a Palme d'Or (1979), a British Animation Award (2014), and is an Emmy Award (2017) and Academy Award (1984) nominee.

== Career ==
=== Early career and Pink Floyd ===
After training at Birmingham College of Art, Emes' career began as a painter, sculptor, and kinetic artist. In 1972 his experimental animated film French Windows (set to Pink Floyd's "One of These Days") was shown on the BBC's Old Grey Whistle Test, bringing him to the attention of producer Martin Baker and subsequently Pink Floyd. French Windows is included in the box set The Early Years 1965–1972.

Emes became the first filmmaker to create synchronised moving images for Pink Floyd, when he collaborated with the group for their late 1974 UK tour. He supplied several sequences, including the flying clock faces at the start of "Time". He laid the foundation for the band's visuals and remains influential; his graphic style is evident, for example, in the large-scale digital animations used in Roger Waters' The Wall concert projections.

In 1974, the band commissioned animations of "Speak to Me" (the cardiogram and prism), "Time" (the flying clocks), and "On the Run" (twin towers explosion) to visualise The Dark Side of the Moon.

His work is featured in the Pink Floyd: Their Mortal Remains exhibition, the first international retrospective of the band. It was presented by the V&A, Pink Floyd and Iconic Entertainment Studios.

=== Animation ===
During the late seventies, Emes created film sequences for numerous other musicians, including M.C. Escher-inspired animations for Mike Oldfield's 1980 In Concert tour and The Oriental Nightfish for Paul and Linda McCartney, which received a Short Film Palme d'Or nomination at Cannes. His Camden studio became world-famous for its ground-breaking visuals, and in 1980 Emes was cited as Britain's foremost animator, his achievements celebrated in a retrospective at the National Film Theatre (1980). Collaborations with musicians continued, including "The Chauffeur" for Duran Duran, starring Perri Lister, and The Wall – Live in Berlin (1990), which was Roger Waters' first solo performance of the album, attended by the then-largest concert audience of all time. The interpretive film by Emes starred Rupert Everett, Ute Lemper and Marianne Faithfull, and included sequences of the Marching Hammers projected onto the remains of the Berlin Wall.

=== Film and television ===
Concurrently Emes diversified into live-action, writing and directing short films, amongst them the ballroom dancing comedy Goodie Two Shoes (1984), produced by Jeff Katzenberg then of Paramount Pictures, for which Emes received an Oscar nomination and a BAFTA Award.

A career in film and television followed, including the series How to Be Cool starring Roger Daltrey, adapted by Emes from the book by Philip Pullman (author of The Golden Compass), Streetwise starring Andy Serkis (1989), and The Invisible Man (2000) for Universal Studios.

In 1987 Emes wrote and directed his feature debut Knights & Emeralds, produced by Sir David Puttnam for Goldcrest Films and Warner Brothers. Television movies include the episode "The Yob" (1988) for The Comic Strip starring Keith Allen, The Munsters' Scary Little Christmas produced by John Landis, and Deadly Summer (1997).

In the mid-nineties, Emes became an in-house director for Ridley Scott at Ridley Scott Associates.

== Personal life ==
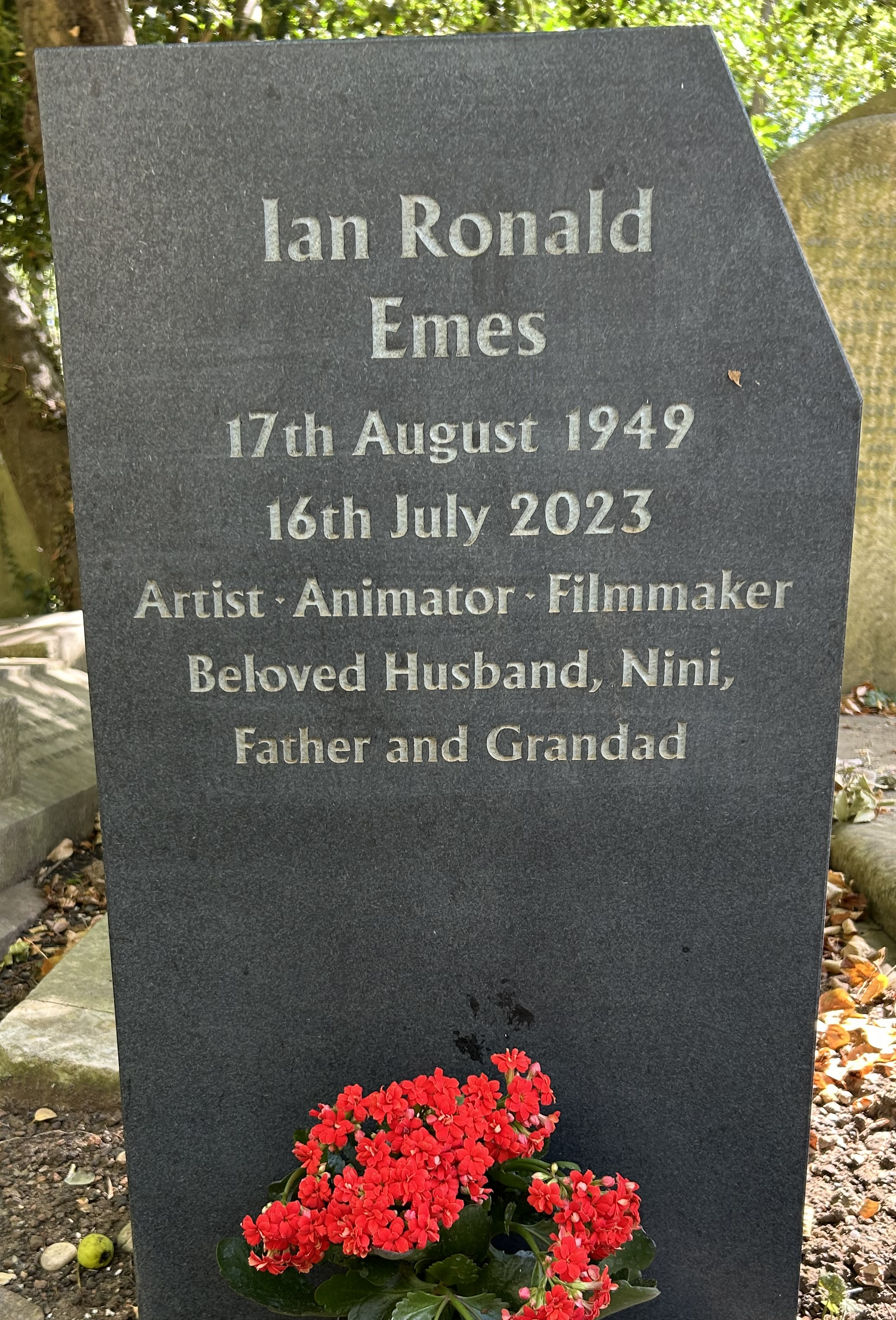
Grave of Ian Emes in Highgate Cemetery

Ian Emes was born in Handsworth, Birmingham, England. He was educated at Marsh Hill Boys Grammar Technical School in Birmingham's Erdington district and then studied at Birmingham College of Art.

Emes lived in London. He died, aged 73, from leukemia on 16 July 2023 and his ashes were buried in Highgate Cemetery. His death was reported by Pink Floyd's official Twitter account on 22 July.

== Exhibitions ==
- ECHOES, No 20 Arts (2018)
- Pink Floyd: Their Mortal Remains, V&A (2017)
- On the Run, City Gallery, Wroclaw (2016)
- Ikons' Icons, Ikon Gallery, Birmingham (2015)
- This Time Tomorrow, Ray Davies, Konk Gallery, London (2014)
- Time, BIAD, Birmingham (2013)
- One of These Days, Unit 24 Southbank, London (2012)
- It Was a Thursday Night, The Horse Hospital, London (2010)
- National Film Theatre Retrospective, London (1980)

== Tours ==
- Roger Waters Us + Them, US Tour (2017)
- David Gilmour European Tour, Royal Albert Hall, London (2016)
- Mike Oldfield in Concert Tour (1980)
- Pink Floyd, Knebworth (1975)
- Pink Floyd World Tour, The Hollywood Bowl (1975)
- Pink Floyd, Empire Pool Wembley (1974)

== Filmography ==
- The Endless River (Film), Pink Floyd (2019)
- Nothing Part 14, Pink Floyd (2016)
- The War of the Worlds, Jeff Wayne (2013)
- Rats (2001)
- The Invisible Man, Universal Television (2000)
- Deadly Summer, C5 (Feature Film) (1997)
- The Munsters' Scary Little Christmas, Universal Television (Feature Film) (1996)
- In-House Director, Ridley Scott Associates (1992 – 1998)
- The Wall – Live in Berlin, Roger Waters (1990)
- How to be Cool, Granada, Phillip Pullman (1989)
- "The Yob", The Comic Strip – C4 (1987)
- Knights and Emeralds (Feature Film), David Puttnam, Warner Bros. (1986)
- The Box of Delights, BBC (1985)
- Goodie Two Shoes, Jeffrey Katzenberg, Paramount Pictures (1983)
- The Magic Shop (1982)
- "The Chauffeur", Duran Duran (1982)
- The Beard (1979)
- Hyde (1979)
- The Oriental Nightfish, Paul and Linda McCartney (1978)
- "Hearts Right", Roger Daltrey (1976)
- "Tubular Bells", Mike Oldfield (1975)
- The Dark Side of the Moon (Tour visuals), Pink Floyd (1974-1975)
- "One of These Days" (Music video), Pink Floyd (1972)

== Awards and nominations ==
- Emmy Nomination (2017)
- British Animation Award Winner (2014)
- BAFTA Award Winner (2011)
- BAFTA Award Winner (2009)
- BAFTA Award Nomination (2002)
- RTS Directing Award (1989)
- RTS Design Award (1989)
- BAFTA Award Winner (1984)
- Oscar Nomination (1984)
- Palme d'Or Winner (1979)
- Award de Qualité (1979)
