= The Strike =

1988 episode of The Comic Strip Presents...

The Strike (also known as Strike!, although this is more properly the title of the fictitious Hollywood movie featured in the episode) is one of the short comedy films – written by Peter Richardson and Pete Richens, and directed by Richardson – which made up the long-running Channel 4 television series The Comic Strip Presents.... First aired in January 1988, it also received a limited theatrical release, and won the Golden Rose of Montreux for the same year.

The film concerns Paul (Alexei Sayle), a Welsh former miner and aspiring screenwriter, who writes a hard-hitting film script about his own experiences of the 1984 Miners' Strike. However, the Hollywood production company that gets hold of his script turns it into a ludicrously sensationalist and anachronistic action film, starring Al Pacino (played by Richardson) as Arthur Scargill, and Meryl Streep (Jennifer Saunders) as his wife. The film also stars Robbie Coltrane, Nigel Planer and Keith Allen (all of whom play multiple roles), in addition to fleeting appearances from most of the regular Comic Strip performers, including Adrian Edmondson, Rik Mayall and Dawn French.

Its subject matter, cinema release, and prestigious award success all contributed to making The Strike one of the most famous of all the Comic Strip films. In addition, the film's theme (of a Hollywood studio creating a warped version of a British historical event) and its chief stylistic device (intercutting the narrative concerning the making of the film with "completed footage" from it, in a film-within-the-film) would be revisited twice by Richardson and Richens: first in the later Comic Strip film GLC: The Carnage Continues..., and then in the movie Churchill: The Hollywood Years. Neither of these films, however, achieved success comparable to The Strike.

== Plot ==
Paul, a Welshman and former miner, has written a screenplay about his experience in the 1984 Miners' Strike. His friend arranges a meeting with the film executives of "Golden Pictures", which is known for pornographic films, but wants to branch out and become more reputable. The executives tell him that they like the script, but they want to make some changes, such as having Arthur Scargill dramatically rescue a woman, played by Meryl Streep, from a collapsing mine (to which Paul points out that the mine would not be operational, since the film is about a strike).

Concerned with the direction the film is taking, and the studio's desire to cast Al Pacino as Arthur Scargill despite the two having little in common, Paul expresses dissatisfaction with his friend who set up the meeting, but is told to trust him. During a location scout, the representatives from Golden Pictures say that they think the modern mining town doesn't look like what they imagined, and decide to set the film in the 1930s and replace various locations such as a shoe store with archaic places like a blacksmith shop. Paul meets a friend who was also a miner and promises to get him a role in the film, but the executives think that he doesn't look like a miner.

Al Pacino drives in a limo to a hotel for the shoot, but is not impressed with the accommodation. While driving, he expresses interest in a small house along the road, and purchases it, evicting the woman who lives there.

Back in the film offices, the executive and Al Pacino say that they want to change the ending of the script from a tragic ending of the strike failing to a happy ending of the underdog winning. Paul and his friend say they are not happy with how the film's direction is going and want to cancel the film. The executive writes two cheques: one to get Paul's friend to leave the production, and the other to keep Paul on board. Al Pacino tells Paul that they need him, and, after seeing the amount of money on the cheque, he agrees to write whatever ending they want.

On the film set, Golden Pictures tears up the modern mining town to create the image they want and turning down actual miners because they don't match the stereotype they have in mind. The footage of the beginning of the film shows Scargill in an anachronistic town as the only person who is literate. He reads a modern copy of Das Kapital in a tavern while the townspeople (including stereotypical miners who wear old-fashioned mining helmets in town) berate him for not having the courage to lead a strike. Meryl Streep is the invented wife of Arthur Scargill who believes his commitment to the miner's rights is straining their marriage and taking a toll on their daughter.

Paul has a nightmare in which a disembodied voice tells him his film is misrepresenting the miners he wanted to help. Paul says it got out of control and he never meant for it to get that way, but the voice accuses him of being complicit by taking the money. He is woken up by a phone call from the executive, who is partying with Al Pacino and asks for a scandalous scene of Arthur Scargill and his drunken antics, which Paul attempts to write, but in the morning admits to Al Pacino that it doesn't fit with the story.

Watching a film reel of more footage, Paul looks in anguish as he sees that the stereotypical miners have physically abused Scargill's wife to send a message to him. Scargill is distraught when he sees this, but they are interrupted when he learns of a mining accident. The miners working on site (despite the alleged strike) tell him that his daughter is down there. He narrowly escapes, but is told that while he was down there, disgruntled miners raided "the dynamite store" and are planning on blowing up a nuclear reactor in retaliation.

The film is completed and the publicity tour commences, showing a promotional tour portraying *The Strike!* as an action romance film. Paul, horrified by this, begins drinking heavily. The remainder of the film is interspersed with an awards ceremony in which the film receives numerous accolades while Paul continues to drink. Arthur Scargill convinces the miners to hold off on blowing up the nuclear reactor until he speaks with Parliament at 3 o'clock. He borrows a motorcycle and races to London, arriving just as Big Ben strikes 3.

Just as the miners are about to detonate, they hear over the radio that Scargill has burst into Parliament and hold off. He is allowed to speak, and gives an impassioned speech about patriotism and democratic values, while his wife (inexplicably present) looks on in the audience. Scargill ends saying that his daughter asked him if he would always be a coal miner, and says that the decision rests with Parliament. A vote is called and the vote is unanimously to agree to the strike's demands and allow coal miners to work! The doors to Parliament open to show Scargill's wife and daughter. His daughter is in leg braces and takes tenuous steps into parliament, while members shake her hand, telling her how brave her father is. When she makes it into Scargill's arms, Parliament erupts in cheers and won't quiet down, ending the film.

The executive tells Paul that he should be proud of how successful his film is, and says they should do it again sometime. Paul returns on a bus to his hometown where he sees townspeople picketing the movie theatre with signs that say he is responsible for misrepresenting their plight. Paul throws his typewriter into the air, letting it smash onto the ground, as he walks out into the pasture.

== Cast ==
- Peter Richardson – Al Pacino as Arthur Scargill
- Jennifer Saunders – Meryl Streep as Mrs Scargill
- Alexei Sayle – Paul
- Dawn French – Verity / Old Lady / "Celebrity"
- Nigel Planer – Bernard / Old Man / Camp Actor 1
- Robbie Coltrane – Goldie / Dutch / "Celebrity"
- Adrian Edmondson – Adrian / Slim / Policeman
- Keith Allen – "Film Executive" / Camp Actor 2 / Architect / "Celebrity"
- Rik Mayall – Speaker / Hunchback
- Ronald Allen – Prime Minister
- Steven O'Donnell – Film Director / Miner
