= Five Go Mad in Dorset =

1982 episode of The Comic Strip

- The Famous Five (L-R): – Timmy the dog – Julian (Peter Richardson) – Anne (Jennifer Saunders) – Dick (Adrian Edmondson) and – George (Dawn French)
- Genre: parody, comedy
- Inspired by: The Famous Five by Enid Blyton
- Written by: Peter Richardson; Pete Richens
- Starring: Peter Richardson; Adrian Edmondson; Dawn French; Jennifer Saunders
- Country of origin: United Kingdom
- Original language: English

Production
- Producers: Michael Hall; Victoria Poushkine-Relf
- Cinematography: Peter Middleton
- Editor: Peter Delfgou
- Camera setup: Multi-camera
- Running time: 30 minutes

Original release
- Network: Channel 4
- Release: 2 November 1982

Related
- The Comic Strip Presents...

Five Go Mad in Dorset was the first of three Five Go Mad specials from the long-running series of The Comic Strip Presents... television comedy films. It first aired on the launch night of Channel 4 (2 November 1982), and was written by Peter Richardson and Pete Richens, and directed by Bob Spiers. It was entirely filmed in Devon rather than Dorset.

== Plot ==
The film is a parody of Enid Blyton's Famous Five books, involving siblings Julian (Richardson), Dick (Adrian Edmondson) and Anne (Jennifer Saunders), and their cousin George (Dawn French) and her dog Timmy. The four children arrive on holiday at Uncle Quentin (Ronald Allen) and Aunt Fanny's home. Upon learning that Uncle Quentin has been kidnapped, the Five decide to spend several days on a cycling holiday in Dorset. After picnicking and reporting some criminals to the local police they celebrate by buying some cakes from a shopkeeper (Robbie Coltrane). At the shop, they encounter a rude but rich boy, Toby (Daniel Peacock), whom the children at first refuse to accept into their group due to his obnoxious behaviour and also their cliquish nature. Later, while camping, Toby is kidnapped. Coltrane later reappears, this time as a lecherous gypsy. The Five discover a secret passage into an abandoned castle, where they find Toby. They also find Uncle Quentin, who reveals his kidnapping was a hoax to cover his split from Aunt Fanny because of his homosexuality. The children call the police and Uncle Quentin is arrested.

== Satirical themes ==
The special mocks and satirises aspects of Blyton's writing, most notably the dated sexism, racism and class snobbery of the Famous Five books (the Five make racist remarks about a porter at the railway station when they are picked up by Aunt Fanny, repeated remarks about Anne as a "proper little housewife") and the formula of the young adventurer genre (most notably kids overhearing criminals discuss their plans, which are portrayed as characters stating "blah blah blah" and key plot elements). There is also a running gag relating to the books' frequent mentions of the various feasts the Five indulge in while picnicking and dining. The film's phrase "lashings of ginger beer" became so well known that it is now often mistakenly attributed to Blyton herself, although it never appears in any of the Famous Five books. The film also makes overt references to bestiality in George (implying a sexual relationship of canine cunnilingus between her and Timmy) and overt references to the criminalisation of homosexuality in pre-1968 Britain.

== Critical reception ==
The film was watched by 3.4 million viewers and drew several complaints for its sexual references and irreverent mockery of Blyton's work, although the broadcaster had obtained permission from Blyton's estate. Reviewing Channel 4's launch night for the Financial Times, Chris Dunkley wrote that it was a "deliciously accurate parody of Enid Blyton's mind-numbingly repetitive adventure stories", but compared it unfavourably to Ripping Yarns.

== Production and filming locations ==
Jennifer Saunders recalls the production fondly in her 2013 autobiography, even though she had "terrible tonsillitis for some of the shoot". Peter Richardson had grown up in South Devon, so was familiar with the coastline and chose various filming locations. Saunders writes that much of the crew were members of Richardson’s family. She describes the shooting as "the happiest time", mainly because the cast could spend their daily expenses allowance at a pub. The arrival of the "children" was filmed at Staverton railway station, Devon. The castle was Berry Pomeroy Castle, and the village with the shop was Broadhembury.

== Cast ==
- Julian – Peter Richardson
- Dick – Adrian Edmondson
- George – Dawn French
- Anne – Jennifer Saunders
- Uncle Quentin – Ronald Allen
- Aunt Fanny – Sandra Dorne
- Toby Thurlow – Daniel Peacock
- Shopkeeper / Gypsy – Robbie Coltrane
- Dirty Dick – Ron Tarr
- Fingers – Nosher Powell
- Police Inspector – Raymond Francis

== Sequels ==
=== Five Go Mad on Mescalin ===
A sequel, Five Go Mad on Mescalin, was produced for the second Comic Strip Presents... series in 1983. The plot, involving a pushy rich American with a spoiled son, is loosely based on Enid Blyton's Five on Finniston Farm (1960). It implies that the Five might have sympathised with Nazi Germany because the Nazis were not as "vulgar" as Americans.

=== Five Go to Rehab ===
The third in the series, Five Go to Rehab, was produced in 2012, and shown on Gold on 7 November. It received poor reviews.

The original cast reprised their roles, now well into middle-age. Reuniting for Dick's birthday after decades apart, the four and Toby lament how their lives took unexpected paths while Dick drags them on another bicycle adventure, which he had meticulously planned for fourteen years. In a reversal, George had married a series of wealthy men whom she cuckolded, with, among others, one of her stepsons (her continuing penchant for bestiality with the latest Timmy is also implied); whereas Anne has become a strongly opinionated vegan spinster and is suspected by Dick of being a "dyke" – an accusation made against George by Toby in the original Five Go Mad in Dorset. George and Julian have been committed to an alcoholics' sanatorium, the latter owes a large debt to African gangsters, and Anne recently served a prison sentence for setting her nanny aflame. The group eventually discover their car sabotaged and track the culprit to the sanatorium where George and Julian are staying. There they are kidnapped by Toby (Daniel Peacock), who reveals his plan to imprison his childhood tormentors in a museum display prison. He also reveals that he has been grooming his own children to serve as replacement version of the Famous Five, under the guise that the world has forgotten the original group. However, Toby's children immediately recognise the Five and turn on their father, who is taken to jail.

Five Go to Rehab utilised a form of a floating timeline; although the original film's events are said to have taken place thirty years in the past and "five years after the war", the reunion film appears to be set approximately contemporaneous to its filming.

This marked the last time Edmondson worked with his comedy partner Rik Mayall, before Mayall's death in June 2014.

=== Music ===
Music in both programmes had been used by the BBC as themes for radio programmes. Titles include: "In Party Mood" (the theme to Housewives' Choice) by Jack Strachey, "Puffin' Billy" (the theme to Children's Favourites and also CBS's Captain Kangaroo) by Edward White, and "Calling All Workers" (the theme to Music While You Work) by Eric Coates.
