= The Supergrass =

- Directed by: Peter Richardson
- Written by: Peter Richardson; Pete Richens
- Produced by: Elaine Taylor
- Starring: Adrian Edmondson; Jennifer Saunders; Dawn French; Peter Richardson; Keith Allen; Nigel Planer; Alexei Sayle; Ronald Allen; Robbie Coltrane
- Distributed by: Recorded Releasing
- Release date: November 1985
- Running time: 107 minutes (theatrical/initial VHS); 93 minutes (TV/later VHS/DVD version)
- Country: United Kingdom
- Language: English
- Box office: £1 million

The Supergrass is a 1985 British comedy film directed by Peter Richardson (who also plays a major role) who also wrote the screenplay with Pete Richens. The film stars Adrian Edmondson, Jennifer Saunders, Dawn French, Keith Allen, Nigel Planer, Alexei Sayle, Ronald Allen, and Robbie Coltrane. The Supergrass was the first feature-length film by the 1980s alternative comedy group The Comic Strip.

The soundtrack to the film featured original music from Keith Tippett, plus music from P. P. Arnold, Grace Jones, and Bob Marley, among others.

== Plot ==
After returning from a holiday at Hope Cove in the West Country, Dennis Carter (Adrian Edmondson) attempts to impress a girl by claiming he is involved in drug smuggling. Although the girl is unimpressed, his remarks are overheard by the police.

Dennis is arrested for questioning and pressured into becoming a supergrass, with the promise of leniency in exchange for information. Having no actual involvement in organised crime, he fabricates details to satisfy police expectations.

Detective Sergeant Troy (Robbie Coltrane) and other officers act on Dennis’s information, pursuing investigations based on his claims. As inconsistencies emerge, people connected to Dennis become caught up in police attention.

As Dennis continues to provide false intelligence, he becomes increasingly overwhelmed by the consequences of his actions, highlighting the risks faced by an inexperienced informer.

== Locations ==
- Hope Cove – Coastal village where Dennis returns from holiday and makes his initial claims.
- Dartmoor – Moorland setting used during the police investigation.
- West Country – Primary regional setting for the film.

== Cast ==
- Adrian Edmondson as Dennis Carter
- Jennifer Saunders as Lesley Reynolds
- Peter Richardson as Harvey Duncan
- Robbie Coltrane as Det. Sgt. Troy
- Nigel Planer as Gunter
- Keith Allen as Wong
- Dawn French as Andrea
- Daniel Peacock as Jim Jarvis
- Ronald Allen as Commander Robertson
- Alexei Sayle as Motorbike Cop
- Michael Elphick as Constable Collins
- Patrick Durkin as Constable Franks
- Marika Rivera as Bed and Breakfast Landlady
- Al Pillay as Mary
- Kevin Allen as Shop Assistant

== Versions ==
The version of the film initially released in the cinema ran 107 minutes, which was subsequently released on VHS running to 103, due to PAL speed-up.

The film was screened by Channel 4 on 13 March 1988, as a prelude to the fourth series of The Comic Strip Presents, but this was a version cut down to 93 minutes 26 seconds, equivalent to 97 minutes 20 seconds in the cinema, so missing some nine minutes 49 seconds. All subsequent VHS and DVD releases, including the "complete" Comic Strip box set, use the shorter cut-down version.
