= Stella Street =

1997 British comedy series

- Created by: John Sessions, Phil Cornwell and Peter Richardson
- Written by: John Sessions, Phil Cornwell and Peter Richardson
- Directed by: Peter Richardson
- Starring: John Sessions, Phil Cornwell, Sandra Cush
- Opening theme: "Art of Art" by Gary DiMichele
- Country of origin: United Kingdom
- Original language: English
- No. of series: 4
- No. of episodes: 36

Production
- Producer: Ben Swaffer
- Running time: 10 minutes (series 1, 3–4), 15 minutes (series 2)
- Production company: Tiger Aspect Productions

Original release
- Network: BBC2
- Release: 22 December 1997 – 11 December 2001

Stella Street is a British television comedy programme, originally screened in four series on BBC Two between 22 December 1997 and 11 December 2001. It takes the form of a mockumentary filmed on a camcorder, based on the fantastical premise that a group of British and American celebrities have all decided to move into Stella Street in Surbiton (actually Hartswood Road, London, W12).

The show (and subsequent film) was conceived and written by John Sessions, Phil Cornwell and Peter Richardson (who also directed). The main characters are played by Sessions, Cornwell and Ronni Ancona. The characters themselves are impressions of famous celebrities such as Marlon Brando, Michael Caine, Jack Nicholson, and, idiosyncratically, UK football pundit Jimmy Hill.

Stella Street's depiction of celebrities is mainly rooted in the popular stereotypes surrounding them. For example, Stella Street's Jack Nicholson is an inveterate womaniser, drug taker, and has a tacky line in Hawaiian shirts. Michael Caine is seen as an awkward wanna-be cognoscente in horn-rimmed glasses and a shock of ginger hair. Dirk Bogarde is a posh buffoon only interested in his rose garden and Country Life magazine. Al Pacino is deluded that he is a "tall actor, like Danny DeVito and Dustin Hoffman", despite the viewer knowing that he (and the others) are of short stature. Joe Pesci is portrayed in the light of his most well-known roles in violent gangster films, while Jimmy Hill inevitably appears dull when talking about the FA Cup Final to plainly uninterested greater celebrities.

Sessions and Cornwell also play other non-celebrity roles including elderly housekeeper and lifelong Stella Street resident Mrs Huggett, couple-from-hell Pam and Graham Slurry, dopey builder Dean Barraclough and the potentially murderous gardener Len MacMonotony.

The show returned for a "fifth" series in 2008 on the comedy website log.tv, but this consists of only seven five-minute pieces of John Sessions, Phil Cornwell and Peter Richardson talking about featured clips from the original series.

== Themes and plot ==
Stella Street depicts its celebrities as finding refuge from the madness of their famous lives in the banality of suburbia and the "everyday" situations they may come across, albeit tinged with a hint of surrealism and comedy referenced from their own stereotyped behaviour.

Examples include Roger Moore visiting David Bowie at Christmas in order to give him a face flannel as a present, a game of Monopoly, Michael Caine trying to instruct Dean the builder on how to build him a kidney shaped swimming pool, and Mick Jagger and Keith Richards running the local corner shop.

== Style ==
The show is mainly filmed in a cinéma vérité style using handheld cameras, often with Cornwell as Michael Caine talking to the camera to introduce characters or situations in the same way he does in the 1966 film Alfie.

Stella Street was originally broadcast in 10–15 minute segments on BBC2. For foreign broadcasts, two or more episodes were concatenated into a 15- to 20-minute format.

When released on VHS (and subsequently on DVD), the series were condensed into feature-length programmes with additional link footage added.

The theme music is titled "Art of Art". It was written and performed by Gary DiMichele and was originally used in the 1996 American film Big Night.

== Celebrity characters ==
Played by John Sessions

Played by Phil Cornwell

- Dirk Bogarde
- Marlon Brando
- Richard Burton
- Alec Guinness
- Tony Hancock
- George Harrison
- Alfred Hitchcock
- Anthony Hopkins
- Dustin Hoffman
- John Hurt
- Steve McFadden
  (as Phil Mitchell)
- Laurence Olivier
- Al Pacino
- Joe Pesci
- Keith Richards
- Alan Rickman
- Princess Margaret
- Paul McCartney
- Patrick Moore
- Roger Moore
- Van Morrison
- Yoko Ono

- David Attenborough
  (voice only)
- Tony Blackburn
- David Bowie
- Wilfrid Brambell
  (as Albert Steptoe)
- Michael Caine
- Tommy Cooper
- Harry H. Corbett
  (as Harold Steptoe)
- David Essex
- Jimmy Hill
- Mick Jagger
- John Lennon
- Des Lynam
- Ross Kemp
  (as Grant Mitchell)
- Jack Nicholson
- Jimmy Savile
- Ringo Starr
- James Stewart
- Sting
- John Thaw
- Kenneth Williams

== Film adaptation ==
Stella Street: The Movie
- Directed by: Peter Richardson
- Written by: John Sessions, Phil Cornwell and Peter Richardson
- Produced by: Ben Swaffer
- Starring: John Sessions, Phil Cornwell, Ronni Ancona
- Cinematography: Mike Robinson
- Edited by: Geoff Hogg
- Music by: Rod Melvin, Dominic Muldowney
- Production companies: Absolutely Productions, Stella Street Ltd.
- Distributed by: Columbia TriStar
- Release date: 22 October 2004
- Running time: 80 minutes
- Countries: United Kingdom, United States
- Language: English

After completing series 4, Richardson, Sessions and Cornwell produced a film adaptation. The team added Ronni Ancona to the cast to play numerous female celebrity characters.

In March 2004, Stella Street: The Movie, was premiered at the Aspen Comedy Festival, where it earned Cornwell and Sessions the festival's Film Discovery Jury Best Actor Award. It received mostly unfavourable reviews, Anita Gates in the New York Times writing "the concept doesn't translate well to the longer form. The sense of the absurd is watered down." while Michael Rechtshaffen in the Hollywood Reporter said "What might have achieved a degree of cult status across the pond when it was aired in 10-minute installments, struggles to pass big-screen scrutiny in a feature-length treatment that hinges on the flimsiest of plot lines." However Derek Elley in Variety thought it "Manages to sustain its single-joke premise...over feature length." The film opened in 10 screens in the US and took $2,574 on the opening weekend. The film has since been released on DVD. It has a 12% (rotten) rating from 17 reviews on Rotten Tomatoes and a 5.3 rating on Internet Movie Database.

=== Cast ===
Phil Cornwell

- Jack Nicholson, Mick Jagger, Michael Caine, Jimmy Hill, Barry Saddler, Muthatrucker, Len McMonotoney, Vince Crush, Tour Guide, Nick Duggan, Costumier, CNO Bob, David Bowie

John Sessions

- Mrs. Huggett, Keith Richards, Jeremy Hickman, Joe Pesci, Dean Baraclough, News Reader, Jack Flatley, Johnny Van Damm, Muthatrucker, Lord Tony Stanford, Dustin Hoffman, The Vicar, Policeman, Al Pacino

Ronni Ancona

- Tara, Madonna, Posh Spice, Penélope Cruz, Jerry Hall, Vicar's Wife, Check-out Girl, Stephanie Giraffe, Jenny Saddler

== See also ==
- List of films based on British sitcoms
