= Phil Cornwell =

English actor and comedian

- Born: Philip Cornwell; Leigh-on-Sea, Essex, England
- Occupations: Actor; comedian; impressionist; writer
- Years active: 1980–present
- Notable work: Spitting Image; Get Fresh; Dead Ringers; Stella Street

Philip Cornwell is an English actor, comedian, impressionist and writer. He is part of the Dead Ringers television and radio series, and co-wrote and performed principal roles in The Glam Metal Detectives and Stella Street. He also portrayed DJ Dave Clifton from I'm Alan Partridge and the movie, Alan Partridge: Alpha Papa.

== Early life and career ==
Cornwell was born in Leigh-on-Sea, in the County of Essex. He first appeared on TV in 1980 in the BBC youth programme Something Else – Southend as an episode presenter.

== Career ==
Cornwell started out as an impressionist and comedian in the early 1980s, but also took on various acting parts. A major breakout role for Cornwell was providing the voice of Gilbert the Alien (an often improv laden multi-impression based puppet) in the 1980s TV series Saturday-morning kids TV show Get Fresh, which later span off into Gilbert's Fridge which he was also a credited writer for. Cornwell also provided the voices of Mick Jagger and David Bowie for the Steve Wright in the Afternoon show on BBC Radio 1 and acted and voiced a variety of characters in TV shows such as Spitting Image, as well as appearing on further children's Saturday morning TV series What's Up Doc? and later Wow!

In 1995, Cornwell received a significant profile boost with a role in the BBC TV series The Glam Metal Detectives playing various characters and providing voice-overs.

In 1996, he performed in a comedy spoof sketch TV advert to The Professionals imitating Martin Shaw's character of "Doyle" (with the actor Ray Trickett playing Lewis Collins' "Bodie") for the release of the Nissan Almera. In 1997 as part of the same advertising campaign he performed another spoof sketch of the 1970s television series The Sweeney.

In 1997 the BBC commissioned Cornwell and fellow impressionist John Sessions to produce comedy vehicle Stella Street that he both wrote and performed in. The show saw him performing parody impressions of famous actors and musicians such as the series narrator, Michael Caine. At the same time he took on the role of Dave Clifton, a local radio DJ on Radio Norwich - a fictional radio station in both series of I'm Alan Partridge, a role he reprised for the movie Alan Partridge: Alpha Papa in 2013.

Cornwell has appeared in several films made by the Comic Strip, including the role as Dave Spanker in Detectives on the Edge of a Nervous Breakdown.

He played the part of Harry Noakes, Captain of the cockleboat Renown in the TV mini-series Dunkirk.

Cornwell also voiced Sir Lancelot and Robin Hood in the animated children's television series King Arthur's Disasters. He played King Stupid in the CBBC series Stupid!, having replaced Marcus Brigstocke, because the latter was involved in Excuse My French on BBC Two. Cornwell also appeared in the Doctor Who episode, "The Fires of Pompeii". In 2010, he presented/hosted the Friday night EuroMillions lottery draw show on BBC One. In 2011 he did several stand-up comedy gigs as character Switzerland McNaughtiehorse. Cornwell is a supporter of Tottenham Hotspur F.C. and presents the weekly podcast The Spurs Show with Mike Leigh.

In January 2013, he appeared in the ITV comedy drama series Great Night Out as Tonky.

He is popularly known for voicing Murdoc Niccals in the virtual band, Gorillaz.

Cornwell played Sanson 'The Bourreau' in the 2023 movie Napoleon, directed by Ridley Scott.

== Filmography ==
=== Film ===
Year	Title	Character
1999	The Comedy Trail: A Shaggy Dog Story	Michael Caine
2000	Blood	Doug
2001	Large	Barry Blaze Mouseley
2004	Churchill: The Hollywood Years	Martin Bormann
2004	Stella Street: The Movie	Mick Jagger
2007	I Could Never Be Your Woman	Cameraman
2007	Lady Godiva: Back in the Saddle	Mayor Osborne
2010	Made in Dagenham	Dave
2013	Alan Partridge: Alpha Papa	Dave Clifton
2023	Napoleon	Sanson 'The Bourreau'

=== Television ===
Year	Title	Character	Production	Notes
1980	Something Else	Various impressions	BBC Television	1 episode
1986–1996	Spitting Image	Jamie Spencer-Churchill (voice)	Central Independent Television	19 episodes
1987	The Corner House	Harry		2 episodes
1987–1988	Get Fresh	Gilbert the Alien (voice)	ITV	80 episodes
1988	On the Waterfront	Gilbert the Alien (voice)	BBC	1 episode
1991	Remote Control	Various Characters	Channel 4	UK version
1992	Frank Sidebottom's Fantastic Shed Show	PC Cornwell		1 episode
1992–2012	The Comic Strip Presents...	Various Characters	Channel 4	8 episodes
1994	The Bill	Jeff Price	ITV	Episode: "Settling The Score"
1994	Lovejoy	Syd Bishop	BBC1	1 episode
1996	Only Fools And Horses	Drunken man in Hospital	BBC	Episode: "Modern Men"
1997–2002	I'm Alan Partridge	Dave Clifton	BBC	Series 1 and 2
2002	The Bill	Shane Pellow	ITV	In 8 episodes from Episode 023 to Episode 071
2002–2006	Dead Ringers	Various Characters	BBC	
2003-2010	Meg and Mog	Mog	CITV and Tiny Pop	
2004	Stella Street	Various Characters	BBC	
2005	Twisted Tales	Doc	BBC Three	Episode: "Whacked"
2005	Stupid!	King Stupid	CBBC	Season 2 (replaced Marcus Brigstocke)
2005–2006	King Arthur's Disasters	Sir Lancelot, Robin Hood (voices)	CITV	
2008	Doctor Who	Stallholder	BBC One	Series 4 Episode 2 "The Fires of Pompeii"
2008	Harry and Paul	Various Characters	BBC	Series 2
2008	Headcases	Robert Mugabe, Morgan Freeman, Steven Spielberg (voices)	ITV, STV, UTV	
2011	Skins	Diesel	E4	Series 5
2012	Mrs Biggs	DS Jack Slipper	ITV	TV miniseries - Episodes 1x2 and 1x5
2013	Car SOS	Voiceover	Channel 4	Series 4 onwards
2013	Great Night Out	Tonky	ITV	Series 1
2013	Misfits	Geoff	E4	
2014	Not Going Out	Police Officer	BBC One	Series 7 Episode 10 'The Wedding'
2014	Midsomer Murders	Eddie Rayner	ITV	Episode: "The Flying Club"
2015	Holby City	Sean Cronin	BBC One	Series 17 Episode 14 'Wages of Sin'
2016	Jericho	Joe Capstick	ITV	
2016	Shaun the Sheep	The Singer	CBBC	Episode: "Rude Dude"
2018	Damned	'Animal' Hames	Channel 4	1 Episode
2022	Man vs Bee	Armstrong	Netflix	TV mini series
2022	Mrs Brown's Boys	Boris	BBC One	2 Episodes
2022	Call the Midwife	Bernard	BBC One	1 Episode
2023	Vera	Philip Robson	ITV	Series 12 Episode 5 'The Rising Tide'

=== Direct-to-video ===
Year	Title	Character	Notes
2002	Phase One: Celebrity Take Down	Murdoc Niccals (voice)	Direct-to-video movie
2006	Phase Two: Slowboat to Hades	Murdoc Niccals (voice)	Direct-to-video movie

=== Web series ===
Year	Title	Character	Notes
2020	Song Machine	Murdoc Niccals (voice)	Web series by Gorillaz

=== Video games ===
Year	Title	Character	Notes
2001	The Italian Job	Charlie Croker	Michael Caine impersonation
