= The Hunt for Tony Blair =

Episode of The Comic Strip Presents

- Written by: Peter Richardson; Pete Richens
- Directed by: Peter Richardson
- Starring: Stephen Mangan; Catherine Shepherd; Robbie Coltrane; James Buckley; Nigel Planer; Ford Kiernan; Jennifer Saunders; Harry Enfield; Rik Mayall; John Sessions; Morgana Robinson; Ross Noble
- Country of origin: United Kingdom
- Original language: English

Production
- Producer: Nick Smith
- Running time: 49 minutes

Original release
- Network: Channel 4
- Release: 14 October 2011

The Hunt for Tony Blair is a one-off episode of The Comic Strip Presents..., a British television comedy, which was first shown on Channel 4 on 14 October 2011. The 49-minute film was written by Peter Richardson and Pete Richens and presented in the style of a 1950s film noir. It stars Stephen Mangan as the former British prime minister Tony Blair, who is wanted for murder and on the run as a fugitive from justice. The film received its world premiere at the Edinburgh International Television Festival in August 2011. It first aired on Channel 4 on 14 October 2011; it received a mostly positive reaction from reviewers, and was nominated for a BAFTA award (Best Comedy Programme 2012) and the British Comedy Awards (Best Comedy Drama 2011).

== Plot summary ==
Using film noir low key lighting and unbalanced frame compositions – along with visual and narrative tropes whose sources include John Buchan's novels and Alfred Hitchcock's films, and Hollywood productions The Fugitive and Sunset Boulevard – the film imagines former British prime minister Tony Blair as a fugitive on the run from the police after having been accused of a series of murders. These include the killing of his former Foreign Secretary Robin Cook, although he is also implicated in the death of his predecessor as Labour Party leader John Smith. Determined to clear his name, Blair escapes from 10 Downing Street; but he is a man with no friends willing to give him sanctuary, while the fervent media demand his capture. Whilst on the run, he commits a series of vehicular manslaughters which he describes as "unavoidable". He is pursued across a fog-bound London by Inspector Hutton and his sergeant, who are helped in their investigation by Peter Mandelson and Gordon Brown. Blair is eventually aided by Margaret Thatcher, a Norma Desmond-like recluse (parodying the 1950 film, Sunset Boulevard), who promptly seduces him. But it gradually emerges that Blair may be innocent of the crime he is accused of committing.

== Cast ==
- Stephen Mangan as Tony Blair
- Catherine Shepherd as Cherie Blair
- Robbie Coltrane as Inspector Hutton
- James Buckley as Sergeant
- Rik Mayall as Prof Predictor
- Nigel Planer as Peter Mandelson
- Ronni Ancona as Barbara Windsor
- Ross Noble as Socialist
- Tony Curran as Robin Cook
- Morgana Robinson as Carole Caplin
- Harry Enfield as Alistair
- Jennifer Saunders as Margaret Thatcher
- John Sessions as Tebbit
- Ford Kiernan as Gordon Brown
- Peter Richardson as George W. Bush

== Background ==
The return of The Comic Strip Presents... for a one-off episode was announced in June 2011 by Channel 4's Head of Comedy Shane Allen, who described the film as having an "irresistibly hilarious script from the godfathers of modern comedy". It was also revealed that Mangan would feature in the role of Blair, while Jennifer Saunders would play former Conservative Prime Minister Margaret Thatcher. Speaking about the forthcoming film, Jay Hunt, the television channel's Chief Creative Officer said: "Comic Strip defined comedy for a generation and it's a real coup to have the team back tackling one of the most controversial subjects of our time in a way that only they can. Tony Blair on the run, Jennifer Saunders as Margaret Thatcher, a stellar cast and hotbed of political intrigue – I can't wait to see the rushes."

In July, the South Devon based Herald Express reported that The Hunt for Tony Blair was being produced by Peter Richardson's Great Western Features, based in Totnes, and that several actors, including Robbie Coltrane, Jennifer Saunders and Nigel Planer were in the area filming for the episode. Locations included The Imperial Hotel and Casino in Torquay, while some outside scenes were shot in Plymouth (Royal William Yard), Cornwood (Police car passing petrol station), Totnes and Dartmouth.

The film received its world premiere on Friday 26 August 2011 at the Edinburgh International Television Festival. Peter Richardson, who co-wrote and directed the film, told The Guardian that he had read Blair's autobiography A Journey as inspiration, and had even taken some lines from the book for use in the script. He also said that he had been sensitive with the portrayal of real people, particularly the former Foreign Secretary Robin Cook and the late Labour Party leader John Smith, both of whom are deceased. "Yes I do worry about Robin Cook and John Smith. There's no suggestion he [Blair] actually did murder these people; it's ridiculous and not true...We couldn't do anything about David Kelly, for instance, because it was too real and too serious".

In August 2011, the film's producer Nick Smith told the Daily Telegraph's Tim Walker that the role of Blair had initially been offered to Michael Sheen, who had played the former Prime Minister on three previous occasions, but that he turned it down so the part was offered to Mangan. At the Edinburgh Festival, Richardson had stated that he believed Mangan's Blair is comparable with that of Sheen.

== Reception ==
Writing in The Guardian, Sam Wollaston gave the film a fairly positive reception, commenting: "You could certainly say that all the Blair stuff here has been done to death ... But actually, though patchy, it works. At times it's an absolute hoot ... It didn't all work, but I laughed more than I've ever laughed in a film by the Comic Strip". The Independent's Hugh Montgomery was equally positive, praising it as "[D]aft, angry and lovingly rendered" and declaring: "[T]his was a political comedy like no other. The Comic Strip may be 30 years old, but, gloriously, it's grown no less anarchic with age". Caitlin Moran writing in The Times described it, in a generally enthusiastic review, as: "The television equivalent of doing nitrous oxide at a party – a quick puff and you're left beaming, with an empty balloon in your hand wishing you could have another one".

However, The Telegraph's Clive James was far less enthusiastic. "Some of the Comic Strip’s catalogue is very good. They did a version of the Arthur Scargill story as it would have looked if Hollywood had taken it over and cast Al Pacino in the lead. I remember laughing at that. They did a version of The Professionals in which the pair of style-free heroes ran around the entire time with their lips pursed. It was called The Bullshitters. I remember laughing very hard at that. But I can already remember not laughing at The Hunt for Tony Blair even once. It made all the standard references to Blair the war criminal as if that was enough. Meanwhile it recreated The 39 Steps and a whole era of British film in which Britain’s short list of stars struggled to be glamorous. Tony Blair, in fact, looked a bit like John Gregson, remembered by dozens of people even today. But even as you admired the fidelity of the stylistics, the show refused to fizz". But John Preston, another Telegraph reviewer, appeared to have had a more mixed opinion of the production, writing: "I saw the Comic Strip Presents… The Hunt for Tony Blair (Friday, Channel 4), described in another paper as "mercilessly satirical". If that was merciless, then give those thumbscrews an extra turn – I can take it! In fact, just like every other Comic Strip film there's ever been, it was quite funny in parts, and entirely unfunny in others".

The website Chortle.com reported that the episode attracted almost two million viewers.
