= Steven O'Donnell (British actor) =

English actor

- O'Donnell as Spudgun in Bottom, 1991
- Born: 19 May 1963 (age 63); Oldham, Lancashire, England
- Occupation: Actor

Steven O'Donnell (born 19 May 1963 in Oldham) is an English actor.

Before O'Donnell became an actor, he spent five years working at Charing Cross Hospital as a Scientific Officer in a medical laboratory. He has appeared in several comedies with Rik Mayall, including The Comic Strip, Bottom, and the film Guest House Paradiso.

He also starred in various advertisements in the United Kingdom for Sega in the mid-1990s, for systems such as the Mega Drive, Master System and Game Gear.

== Television ==
Year	Title	Role
1985	There Must Be an Angel (Playing with My Heart) (music video) by Eurythmics	Singing Angel
1986–1989	The Bill	Various
1988–2005	The Comic Strip Presents...	Various
1989	Young, Gifted and Broke	Bolton
1991–1995	Bottom	Spudgun
1993	Lovejoy	Frankie
1993	Minder	Barry 'Barrel' Powell
1995	How to Be a Little Sod	Father
1996	Spice World	Jess
2001	So What Now?	Stuart
2002	Silent Witness	Tosh Ridley
2003	Foyle’s War	Henry Jamieson
2004	Shameless	Bailiff (2 episodes)
2004–2006	Help! I'm a Teenage Outlaw	Captain Watt
2005–2007	TittyBangBang	Body Guard
2010	Doctors	Ivor Juggins
2011	Holby City	Graham Calder
2011	The Hunt for Tony Blair	Donny Rumsfeld
2014	Badults	Aggressive Gary
2015	Ballot Monkeys	Mick
2015	Scottish Mussel	Gavin
2018	Sky Comedy Shorts	Terry
2020	The Letter for the King	Mayor's Constable

== Filmography ==
Year	Title	Role
1984	One Night at the Tables	Steve
1985	One for My Baby	George
1986	London's Burning	Video Shop Proprietor
1987	The Love Child	Young Policeman
1988	Paperhouse	Dustman
1988	Without a Clue	Henry the Bartender
1989	Great Balls of Fire!	Heckler No. 2
1991	The Pope Must Die	Rico
1992	Far and Away	Colm
1997	Bring Me the Head of Mavis Davis	Lenny
1997	Spice World	Jess
1997	The Trick	Judge
1998	Martha, Meet Frank, Daniel and Laurence	Male Information Official
1998	Shakespeare in Love	Lambert
1999	Guest House Paradiso	Chef Lardy Barsto
2000	Kevin & Perry Go Large	Big Baz
2000	The Nine Lives of Thomas Katz	Keith
2001	A Knight's Tale	Simon, the Summoner of Rouen
2004	Churchill: The Hollywood Years	Goering
2007	Finding Rin Tin Tin	Johnson
2008	The Cottage	Andrew
2011	Conan the Barbarian	Lucius
2014	The Hooligan Factory	Old Bill
2015	Scottish Mussel	Gavin
2017	Breath	Harry Tennyson

== Radio ==
- 1995: Old Harry's Game as The Demon Gary
