= The Comic Strip =

Group of British comedians

- Notable work: The Comic Strip Presents... (1982–2000, 2005–2016)

Comedy career
- Years active: 1980–2016
- Genre: Alternative comedy
- Members: Adrian Edmondson; Dawn French; Rik Mayall; Nigel Planer; Peter Richardson; Jennifer Saunders; Alexei Sayle

The Comic Strip are a group of British comedians who came to prominence in the 1980s. They are known for their television series The Comic Strip Presents..., which was labelled as a pioneering example of the alternative comedy scene. The core members are Adrian Edmondson, Dawn French, Rik Mayall, Nigel Planer, Peter Richardson and Jennifer Saunders, with appearances by Keith Allen, Robbie Coltrane, Alexei Sayle and others.

== Early history ==
Two double acts, Adrian Edmondson and Rik Mayall under the name 20th Century Coyote and Nigel Planer and Peter Richardson as The Outer Limits, started performing at the newly opened Comedy Store in London in 1980, alongside compere Alexei Sayle who had been resident there since the Comedy Store opened in 1979. Concurrently Richardson searched for a venue to mount a play he had produced with Michael White. He planned to run the Comic Strip late at night after the play's performances. He sourced the Raymond Revuebar in Soho, but realising it was unsuitable for a theatrical production and running out of enthusiasm for the play, he decided to continue with the idea of a cabaret night. He persuaded the double acts and Sayle to move from the Comedy Store along with Arnold Brown, an older stand-up comic who did not fit so obviously into the alternative comedy scene. Sayle again resumed his compere duties and decided the running order, with Richardson having behind-the-scenes control. Richardson put out an advert for female performers which was answered by French and Saunders.

Richardson prompted members to sign a contract to signify their attachment to the group. The Comic Strip opened at the Revuebar's Boulevard Theatre on 7 October 1980 and ran until 1981, when the troupe went on a national tour and then a tour of Australia. While the performers gained more exposure, actors such as Jack Nicholson and Robin Williams turned up to watch. A half-hour television documentary about the Comic Strip was broadcast in 1981.

Richardson approached producer Mike Bolland, the newly appointed Channel 4 youth-and-entertainment commissioning editor to propose a series of Comic Strip films for the channel. Bolland agreed to his proposal, his first commission for the station and Jeremy Isaacs quickly approved the budget. Richardson negotiated a deal with the channel for six self-contained half-hour films, using the group as actors rather than standup performers. Almost simultaneously, the BBC signed Edmondson, Mayall, Planer, and Sayle to star in The Young Ones, a sitcom in the same anarchic style as the Comic Strip. Richardson was initially to have played the role of Mike (ultimately given to Christopher Ryan), but did not, the result of differences with the show's producer, Paul Jackson.

== Television ==
=== The Comic Strip Presents... ===
The Comic Strip
- Also known as: The Comic Strip Presents...
- Created by: Peter Richardson
- Starring: Adrian Edmondson; Dawn French; Rik Mayall; Nigel Planer; Peter Richardson; Jennifer Saunders
- Country of origin: United Kingdom
- No. of series: 5
- No. of episodes: 42 (plus 5 films) (list of episodes)

Production
- Running time: 30 minutes

Original release
- Network: Channel 4 (1982–1988, 1998, 2000, 2005, 2011); BBC2 (1990–1993); Gold (1990s–2016); Paramount Comedy (2000s)
- Release: 2 November 1982 – 20 January 2016

The Comic Strip Presents... debuted on 2 November 1982, the opening night of Channel 4. Each episode was prefixed by an animated lead-in consisting of the words "The Comic Strip Presents" accompanied by a soundtrack consisting of a drum machine and a Farfisa organ rendition of "Quando quando quando", together with a bomb labelled "Have a nice day", falling towards a map. In the early episodes the map was of a section of north Dorset and southern Wiltshire, centred on the town of Shaftesbury.

The first episode was Five Go Mad in Dorset, a parody of the Famous Five. It was written by Peter Richardson and Pete Richens, who wrote most of the early episodes. Five Go Mad... drew anger from some viewers for the way it mercilessly satirised a children's classic, although the Enid Blyton estate had given permission for the broadcast. A meeting was called to discuss the group's future with Channel 4, after complaints from viewers.

The final episode of the first series was to have been a spoof chat show called Back to Normal with Eddie Monsoon (referred to as An Evening with Eddie Monsoon by some sources). It was never produced, as it was considered too vulgar even for the "alternative" Channel 4, and contained material that was possibly libellous. The script—which, uniquely for the Comic Strip, was written as a collaboration by the entire cast—was later published, along with the rest of the series, in book form.

A second series of seven episodes followed in 1983–84, including Five Go Mad on Mescalin, a sequel to the first episode, and the newly written Eddie Monsoon – A Life?, a spoof documentary on the life and times of the title character, an obscene, drunken television host (played by Adrian Edmondson). Michael White, the theatre impresario and Rocky Horror Show producer who had been brought in by Richardson as executive producer on the series, appeared in this episode as Monsoon's producer, who had been responsible for axing Eddie's television comeback show—called Back to Normal with Eddie Monsoon. The reasons given for the cancellation (e.g. "the things you said about Burt Reynolds") are presumably the same problems that led to the real Back to Normal... being dropped by Channel 4. (The name Eddie Monsoon—a corruption of "Edmondson"—was later used by Jennifer Saunders, core member and Adrian Edmondson's wife, for her character in Absolutely Fabulous.) A Fistful of Travellers' Cheques was the first episode to be filmed outside the United Kingdom, being made on location in and around San José, Andalusia, Spain, using some of the same locations as A Fistful of Dollars which it spoofs.

Two one-off episodes were aired on Channel 4 over Christmas 1985, reflecting the tight schedules of the group. Consuela was a French and Saunders-led pastiche of the Alfred Hitchcock film Rebecca (1940), with French's eponymous crazed housekeeper taking centre stage. The second episode, Private Enterprise, was the tale of a music business rip-off, where Peter Richardson steals a studio recording session tape and passes the results off as his own work.

The group made two feature films—The Supergrass (1985) and Eat the Rich (1987) as well as three one-off Comic Strip Presents... episodes which were the next to be screened on Channel 4. The first of these, The Bullshitters, was a parody of television spy and detective shows such as The Professionals. It was not broadcast under the Comic Strip name, partly because of the original group only Richardson appears (he is the only performer to appear in every single episode), and partly because co-star and co-writer Keith Allen did not want to be so closely associated with the group.

The third series was broadcast in 1988, and some episodes had longer running times, mostly around 50 minutes. Five of the six episodes (all except Funseekers) were given a limited theatrical release. They included The Strike, which won the Golden Rose of Montreux; More Bad News, a sequel to Bad News Tour showing the band reforming after five years to play at Castle Donington; and Mr. Jolly Lives Next Door, written by Mayall and Edmondson in the violent style of their sitcoms Filthy Rich & Catflap and Bottom, which featured Peter Cook as a psychotic contract killer (the eponymous Mr. Jolly) and Nicholas Parsons. Peter Richardson and Pete Richens only contributed one episode to the third series, allowing cast members such as Planer and Sayle to get their ideas on screen.

By then, the show had proved a hit, and some big names appeared in later productions, including Leslie Phillips, Miranda Richardson, Lionel Jeffries, Nicholas Parsons, Peter Capaldi, Hugh Cornwell, Kate Bush, Richard Vernon, Ruby Wax, Graham Crowden, Paul McCartney, Ozzy Osbourne, Lemmy, Elvis Costello, and Benjamin Zephaniah (as a Rastafarian police van driver), and several musical acts, particularly from the Bad News series which was also aided by Queen guitarist Brian May, such as Def Leppard and Marillion.

=== BBC and after ===
In 1990, the series transferred to BBC2. By now, all the regulars (with the exception of Peter Richardson) had become more famous for their own shows, and more recurring performers such as Gary Beadle, Phil Cornwell, Steve O'Donnell, Mark Caven, Sara Stockbridge, and Doon Mackichan were brought in. Rik Mayall was contracted to ITV's The New Statesman, and was only able to appear in two of the BBC productions (GLC, and the Comic Relief special Red Nose of Courage). Richardson and Richens took over the bulk of the writing again, and Richardson also took over as director, having previously directed the two feature films, as well as The Strike. The six-part 1990 series was followed by three individual specials in 1992, and a final six episodes in 1993.

=== Return to Channel 4 ===
In 1998, the original team reunited and returned to Channel 4 for the first time since 1988, for a one-off special, Four Men in a Car. This was followed in 2000 by a sequel, Four Men in a Plane. After a five-and-a-half-year hiatus, another 60-minute one-off special, Sex Actually (a parody of the 2003 film Love Actually), was made in 2005. It starred Sheridan Smith (Two Pints of Lager and a Packet of Crisps) and Tamer Hassan (Layer Cake) alongside several of the regular cast members. Four Men in a Car was notable for being the first broadcast, on either television or radio, to involve Rik Mayall since his quad bike accident. Permission was thus given by Mayall's family to show the special.

Peter Richardson, who has built his career as a writer-director with the TV series Stella Street and films such as Churchill: The Hollywood Years, has not ruled out the possibility of a whole new series of The Comic Strip Presents... featuring younger cast members.

In June 2011, a casting call went out for a new hour-long episode, starring most of the original team. This was followed by an announcement that the Comic Strip was to produce a one-off special entitled The Hunt for Tony Blair, starring Stephen Mangan as Blair and Robbie Coltrane as Inspector Hutton. The one-off show included Jennifer Saunders (as Margaret Thatcher), as well as Harry Enfield, Rik Mayall, and a host of others.

=== The move to Gold ===
As of 2009, the archive of Channel 4 episodes has been broadcast on UKTV's flagship channel, Gold. In May 2010, it was announced that Gold would broadcast a 30th-anniversary documentary, preceded by the next new scripted episode of the series, Five Go to Rehab, a sequel to Five Go Mad in Dorset which featured the entire original cast (Ade Edmondson, Dawn French, Jennifer Saunders, Peter Richardson, as well as Rik Mayall, Nigel Planer, Stephen Mangan and Robbie Coltrane) and was filmed in the first weeks of July 2012, in and around Totnes; Richardson wrote and directed the film. The film showcased the characters thirty years on trying to recapture their youth. The film broadcast on Gold 7 November 2012.

In addition, a documentary broadcast 3 November 2012, 30 Years of Comic Strip, detailed the filming and reception of several Comic Strip episodes including both original Five Go Mad episodes, The Strike and its semi-sequel GLC: The Carnage Continues, A Fistful of Travellers' Cheques, The Bullshitters/Detectives on the Edge of a Nervous Breakdown, Bad News Tour/More Bad News, and The Hunt for Tony Blair. For A Fistful of Travellers' Cheques, a short sequel was made and broadcast in several parts, showing the two main characters reuniting, despite the ending of the original episode; unshown scenes of the original episode were also aired for the first time. For the Bad News aspect of the documentary, Planer and Richardson dressed up as their respective characters Den Dennis and Spider Webb, recalling their time as Bad News. Some of the telling of the Bad News story was real, due to their real-life signing to EMI; and some fictional, such as the scenes from More Bad News detailing the recording of their debut album. A lot of the original cast were interviewed for the documentary, alongside other people involved with the series at some point such as James Buckley and Stephen Mangan. As Gold, in its current format at least, has never screened the BBC's GLC, ...Nervous Breakdown, or Channel 4's The Hunt for Tony Blair, these were the first time clips from these episodes were aired on the channel.

In May 2018, a two-hour documentary history produced by Sean Doherty aired on Gold titled How the Young Ones Changed Comedy. It combined archive footage with revelations from many of the stars involved – such as Planer, Alexei Sayle, John Lloyd, Paul Jackson, and Lise Mayer – while later comedians discussed The Young Ones' impact on British comedy generally.

== Episodes ==
The Comic Strip Presents... originally ran for three series and one special on Channel 4 from 1982 to 1988. Two series and three specials subsequently aired on BBC2 between 1990 and 1993. Since then, specials have aired sporadically on Channel 4, beginning in 1998 and most recently in 2016. The collective also created four theatrical films between 1985 and 2004. There have been a total of 42 television episodes, four feature films, and one short film.

== See also ==
- Alternative Cabaret
- Saturday Live (British TV programme)
- The Comedy Store (London)
