= Peter Richardson (British director) =

English director, screenwriter, comedian and actor

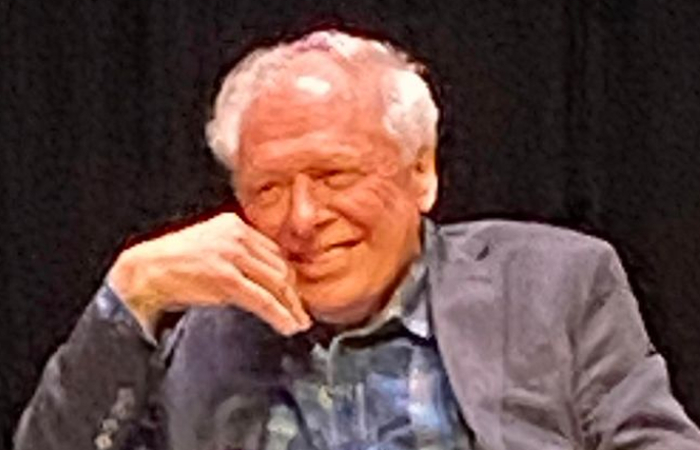
- Richardson in 2023
- Born: 15 October 1951 (age 75); Newton Abbot, Devon, England
- Occupations: Director, screenwriter, actor, comedian
- Notable work: The Comic Strip Presents..., The Supergrass, The Pope Must Die, Stella Street
- Spouse(s): Marta Richardson (m. 1981–present, 4 children, including Red)

Comedy career
- Years active: 1968–present
- Medium: Television, film, stand-up
- Genres: Black comedy, physical comedy, musical comedy, parody, alternative Comedy, character comedy

Peter Richardson (born 15 October 1951) is an English director, screenwriter, actor and comedian. He founded the Comic Strip troupe of performers, which had his double act with Nigel Planer and boosted the careers of French and Saunders, Rik Mayall and Adrian Edmondson, and Alexei Sayle. Richardson approached Channel 4 to make a series of short, self-contained one-off comedy films with this group, which led to The Comic Strip Presents..., the majority of which featured Richardson in acting, writing and directing roles.

Richardson began his career as a teenager acting in Alan Bennett's Forty Years On, before he trained at the Bristol Old Vic Theatre School from 1971 to 1973. He later created his own experimental theatre shows with Nigel Planer amongst others, mixing comedy and improvisation with rock music. Two of these shows, Rank and The Wild Boys, toured nationally.

Although he did not reach the same level of public recognition as some of his contemporaries, Richardson was influential on British television comedy throughout the 1980s as the driving force behind The Comic Strip Presents... films, first shown on Channel 4 in 1982. The series was one of the first examples of alternative comedy to appear on British television. Richardson has been involved in the production of over 40 Comic Strip films and has directed 17 of them. The series won a Rose D'Or for The Strike in 1988. He developed the series into feature films; The Supergrass, Eat the Rich, The Pope Must Die, and Churchill: The Hollywood Years, none of which achieved great box office success. In the 1990s, Richardson introduced a new generation of performers: Doon Mackichan, Mark Caven, Phil Cornwell, Sara Stockbridge, George Yiasoumi and Gary Beadle, who appeared in his productions. He co-wrote and directed the 1990s cult mockumentary comedy series Stella Street with Phil Cornwell and John Sessions. In 2004, Richardson co-founded, with Nick Smith, the production company Great Western Features, based in Totnes, Devon. In 2005, he directed the Comic Strip film Sex Actually. In the 2010s, Richardson wrote and directed three more Comic Strip films: 2011's The Hunt for Tony Blair, 2012's Five Go to Rehab and 2016's Red Top. In a July 2021 interview, Richardson said he is writing a book on The Comic Strip, due to come out in 2022.

== Early life ==
Richardson was born on 15 October 1951 in Newton Abbot, Devon, England and lived in a house near Denbury. His parents ran a children's summer camp school. The family moved to Dartmoor when Richardson was ten. Richardson describes himself as "a Devonian, honest, cream on first every time." Richardson would go on to set a number of his films in Devon, and found his production company there. At one point he was a lifeguard at a Devon swimming pool, despite having failed the swimming test, "but they still hired me as they were so short staffed." The family did not have a television, but his father had a cine camera with which they would make films. Richardson credits this as the beginning of his interest in filmmaking. Encouraged by his parents, he moved to London when he was seventeen, having decided he wanted to be an actor.

== Career ==
=== Early career ===
Richardson appeared as one of the schoolboys in Alan Bennett's Forty Years On, starring John Gielgud and Paul Eddington. This work led to him getting an agent and performing in TV plays as an extra. He then attended the Bristol Old Vic Theatre School. It was here in the second year he became reacquainted with Nigel Planer, who had worked at Richardson's parents' summer camp. The pair shared an interest in rock music, and wanted to mix music with a comedy show; in Richardson's words "we felt we'd like to try something like what Frank Zappa was doing on records, which was being funny but using music as well.". Around this time Richardson and Planer were heavily influenced by U.S. comedians Sal's Meat Market, an early duo of John Ratzenberger and Ray Hassett, as well as the group Alberto y Lost Trios Paranoias.

With the assistance of Caroline Jay, they produced a show called Rank, inspired by the police raid of the 1974 Windsor Free Festival, which premiered at the Roundhouse Downstairs in August 1976. Planer and Richardson played all the characters in the play, which numbered around forty. The play was well received and enabled the pair to get an Arts Council grant to take it on tour. Despite the critical acclaim, at the end of the tour Richardson and Planer found themselves with no money and had to pursue other work, with Richardson squatting in London.

After Rank, Richardson toured with a band in Italy and also helped run drama courses for children at his parents' house in Devon. One of the dramas produced from these courses became a show called The Wild Boys, based on the book by William Burroughs. Richardson performed this show at the ICA in London as well as touring the show with the group Furious Pig. Through this, Richardson first met Michael White, with whom he planned to take the show into the West End, although this came to nothing. He worked as an extra on Michael Palin's Ripping Yarns' second series in 1979, appearing as a German spy pretending to be a Cornish fisherman, in "Whinfrey's Last Case".

=== "The Outer Limits" ===
Richardson and Planer started performing at London's Comedy Store in 1979, calling themselves "The Outer Limits". They performed short sketches parodying different television styles, for example sitcom and American police drama. They used visual comedy and often mimed over-the-top scenes of cartoon violence. At this point, various television companies were taking note of the rapidly growing "alternative comedy" scene, BBC producer Paul Jackson being the first to commission a programme from regular performers at the Comedy Store. This became 1980's Boom Boom...Out Go The Lights. Jackson's decision to only showcase solo performers, featuring Planer's Neil character instead of The Outer Limits as a duo angered Richardson, who began a long-standing feud with Jackson. Mike in BBC comedy The Young Ones was written with Richardson in mind but he did not take part for reasons partly connected to his earlier disagreement with Paul Jackson and due to his commitments with The Comic Strip. Richardson was replaced by Christopher Ryan. The Outer Limits were hired by Kevin Rowland as an opening act for Dexy's Midnight Runners on their tour of The Projected Passion Revue in 1981.

=== The Comic Strip Presents... ===
As a result of searching for a West End venue to stage The Wild Boys, Richardson and Michael White found a new possible venue for his comedy club, the Boulevard Theatre in the Raymond Revue Bar, run by Paul Raymond. Richardson called it The Comic Strip, taking with him a core group from the Comedy Store. It opened in October 1980 and ran until 1981, when the troupe went on a national tour. Richardson approached producer Mike Bolland, the new Channel Four youth and entertainment commissioning editor to propose a series of Comic Strip films for the channel. Bolland agreed to his proposal, his first commission for the station and Jeremy Isaacs quickly approved the budget. The series opener, Five Go Mad in Dorset was the first comedy shown on the new channel on its opening night in November 1982.

The Comic Strip Presents... ran from 1982 to 1988 on Channel 4 and then continued from 1990 to 1993 on the BBC. Richardson wrote more than half of the shows together with his writing partner Pete Richens, and he also directed most of the BBC series. In 1998 Richardson, Planer, Mayall and Edmondson reunited to appear in new film Four Men in a Car, about four obnoxious sales representatives. This was followed up by 2000s Four Men in a Plane. Richardson returned to Channel 4 with the Comic Strip film, Sex Actually in 2005. In 2011, he wrote and directed The Hunt for Tony Blair. In 2012, he wrote and directed, Five Go to Rehab which premiered on Gold.

=== Feature film work ===
Richardson's success on the small screen has not always translated well to cinematic releases. The Supergrass (1985), was the first feature length theatrical release for a Comic Strip film and was funded through Film4 Productions. Reviews were mixed but mostly favourable and the film has a cult following. Richardson himself expressed the opinion in retrospect that maybe it was too gentle for a Comic Strip film.

Richardson followed this up with the 1987 film Eat the Rich, written by himself and Pete Richens, about a waiter at an exclusive restaurant called Bastard's, who stages a rebellion against the government. Critics were mixed in their opinions on the film. Hal Hinson writing in The Washington Post gave the film a lukewarm review and said "The punk jaggedness they bring to their derivations is the only hint of originality, but this, too, seems a little staid. It feels like punk on the downward swing, after most of its rude energy has dissipated." Vincent Canby in the New York Times was more favourable and drew comparisons to "an upscale John Waters satire" and "Jean-Luc Godard's pre-Maoist period". In January 1988 the film was one of several attacked in the Sunday Times by Oxford University historian Norman Stone for their critique of Thatcherite society and values, Stone describing them as "worthless and insulting" and "riddled with left wing bias".

Richardson ran into controversy with a proposed three part papal satire which he pitched to Channel 4 in 1988. Several British newspapers found that the script was being considered, generating anger amongst the Catholic establishment and after some unfavourable press attention Channel 4 scrapped the project. Shortly after this Richardson moved The Comic Strip Presents... to the BBC and produced two episodes based on the original trilogy screenplay, although they were much changed. He reworked the remainder of the story and again with backing from Film4 used elements of it to write the 1991 film The Pope Must Die, starring Comic Strip regulars Robbie Coltrane and Adrian Edmondson along with Herbert Lom and Paul Bartel. Richardson again directed. The film experienced problems placing advertising in several countries, particularly the US due to its controversial title, received mixed reviews from critics and struggled to make back its £2.5 million budget, grossing $2,544,770 overall (approximately £1.7 million).

Richardson appeared in the 1992 revival of the Carry On franchise, Carry On Columbus, alongside other Comic Strip members Rik Mayall, Alexei Sayle and Nigel Planer. The film was badly received, with Time Out London saying, "None of the new crew of Sayle, Richardson, Mayall and Planer is remotely endearing in their awfulness."

In 2003 Richardson began filming on his return to the big screen, directing Christian Slater and Neve Campbell in Churchill: The Hollywood Years, which was released in December 2004. The film was a return to the universe of Comic Strip films The Strike and GLC, where Hollywood remakes and distorts events from British historical events and portrayed Winston Churchill as a gun toting U.S. G.I. similar to Bruce Willis. Philip French writing in the Observer called it "a hit and miss affair" Peter Bradshaw in the Guardian gave it three stars and said "It's wildly uneven and very broad, but there are some laughs in Peter Richardson's Comic Strip fantasy of Churchill's real life as a kickass action hero." However Nev Peirce on the BBC's website panned the film, saying "Sadly, Peter Richardson suffers the fate of many satirists; in trying to mock bad films, he's simply made a bad film." The film grossed £148,326 on its opening weekend across 170 screens in the UK The same year Richardson released a feature-length film of Stella Street through his new production company. He co-wrote and directed the film. It received unfavourable reviews. Anita Gates in the New York Times wrote, "The concept doesn't translate well to the longer form. The sense of the absurd is watered down", while Michael Rechtshaffen in the Hollywood Reporter said, "What might have achieved a degree of cult status across the pond when it was aired in 10-minute installments, struggles to pass big-screen scrutiny in a feature-length treatment that hinges on the flimsiest of plot lines." One reviewer said, "Two people walked out of the screening in the first half hour and the man sitting next to me slept through it", while Matthew Smith from Film International Journal said, "The story and tone are so confused and the caliber of impersonations so inconsistent, the film will please only the most Anglophilic of audiences." However Derek Elley in Variety thought it "Manages to sustain its single-joke premise... over feature length." The film opened in 10 screens in the USA and took $2,574 on the opening weekend.

=== Other television work ===
During the last series of Comic Strip films, Richardson introduced a new group of performers: Doon Mackichan, Mark Caven, Phil Cornwell, Sara Stockbridge, George Yiasoumi and Gary Beadle, and went on to star them in "The Glam Metal Detectives". The series was a hit with critics, and did well enough in the ratings, but spiralling production costs and internal wranglings at the BBC meant it only ran for one series.

Apart from the Comic Strip, Richardson's best-known work is the sitcom Stella Street, which he directed and co-wrote with Phil Cornwell and impressionist John Sessions. A Stella Street feature film was released in 2004. He also directed the mock documentary Lust for Glorious about comedian Eddie Izzard with Mark Caven and Phil Kay.

=== Production work ===
In 2004, Richardson co-founded the production company Great Western Features with Nick Smith, which is based in Totnes, Devon. The company produced Churchill: The Hollywood Years, feature film The Golden Road and the Comic Strip production Sex Actually. They also produced a feature-length film of Stella Street, which Richardson also directed. They filmed a new Comic Strip entitled It Ends Badly in August 2013. They have also produced commercials for recycling, Flybe, Harris Tweed and the Devon Tourist Board.

== Personal life ==
His son Red Richardson is a stand-up comedian.

== Filmography ==
=== Films ===
- The Supergrass (1985)
- Eat the Rich (1987)
- The Pope Must Die (1991)
- Carry On Columbus (1992)

=== TV series ===
- The Comic Strip Presents... (42 episodes) (1982–2016)

=== Director ===
- The Supergrass (1985)
- Eat the Rich (1987)
- The Comic Strip Presents (20 episodes) (1988–2016)
- The Pope Must Die (1991)
- The Glam Metal Detectives (1995)
- Eddie Izzard: Glorious (1997)
- Stella Street (TV series) (1997)
- Stella Street (film) (2004)
- Churchill: The Hollywood Years (2004)
