= Architecture of Provence =

The architecture of Provence includes a rich collection of monuments from the Roman era, Cistercian monasteries from the Romanesque period, medieval castles and fortifications, as well as numerous hilltop villages and fine churches. Provence was a very poor region after the 18th century, but in the 20th century it had an economic revival and became the site of one of the most influential buildings of the 20th century, the Unité d'Habitation of the architect Le Corbusier in Marseille.

Provence, in the southeast corner of France, corresponds with the modern administrative region of Provence-Alpes-Côte d'Azur and includes the departments of Var, Bouches-du-Rhône, Alpes-de-Haute-Provence, as well as parts of Alpes-Maritimes and Vaucluse. The original comté de Provence extended from the west bank of the Rhone River to the east bank of the Var river, bordering the comté of Nice. Provence culturally and historically extended further west of the Gard to Nîmes and to the Vidourle river.

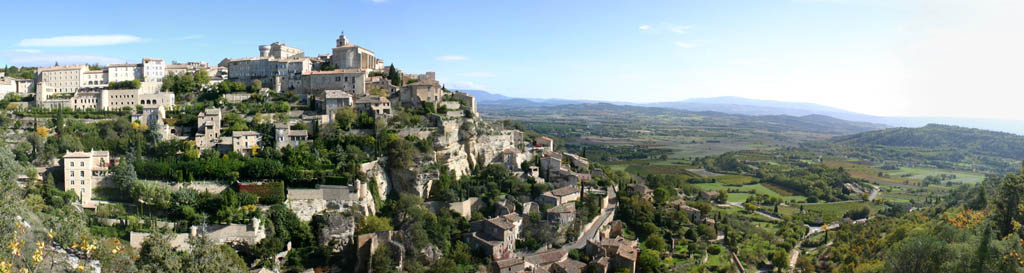
Gordes, in the Vaucluse, is a classic example of a Provençal hilltop village.

== Prehistoric and ancient sites in Provence (27,000 BC to the 2nd century BC) ==
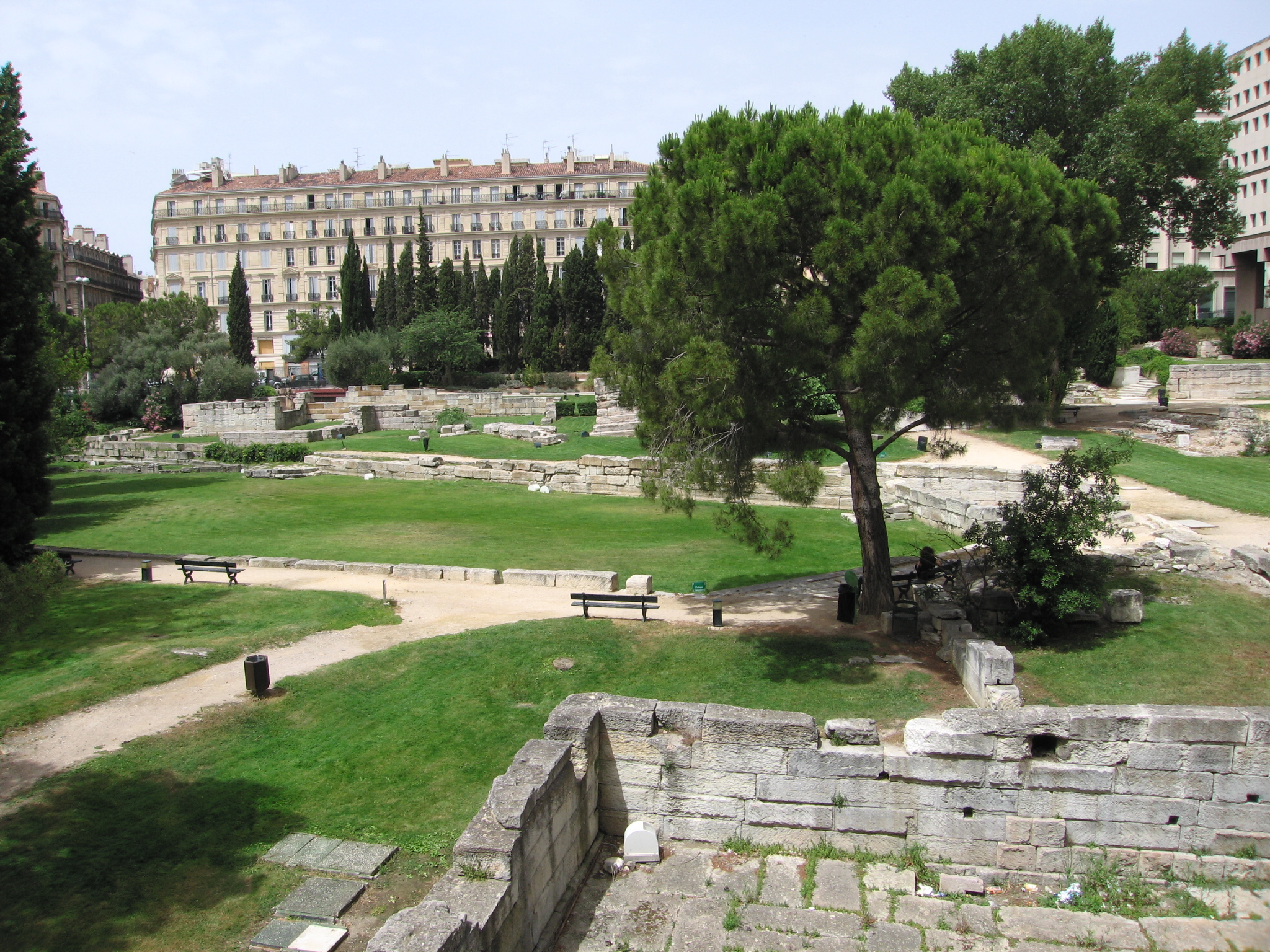
The Jardin des Vestiges in Marseille, with remains of the ancient Phocaean port city of Massalia, discovered in 1967 during construction work.

Remains of a prehistoric settlement dating to between 27,000 and 19,000 BC were found by divers in 1991 at the Cosquer Cave, an underwater cave in a calanque on the coast near Marseille.

A Neolithic site dating to about 6000 BC. was discovered in Marseille near the current Saint Charles railway station, which has remains of walls made of baked clay with holes for posts, as well as tools.

Marseille was founded in about 546 BC by Greek colonists coming from the city of Phocaea (now Foça, in modern Turkey) on the Aegean coast of Asia Minor, who were fleeing an invasion by the Persians. They called their settlement Massalia.

Traces of the original settlement have been found on the west side of the butte Saint-Laurent in Marseille. The original settlement extended to the east toward the butte des Moulins and finally the butte des Carmes, covering about fifty hectares. The size of the original settlement were not exceeded until the 17th century.

Remains of the ancient Phocaean fortifications of Massalia dating to the end of the 7th century BC can be seen in the Jardin des Vestiges and on the butte des Carmes. In the 2nd century BC the entire system of fortifications were rebuilt in pink limestone. Parts of the ramparts can still be seen in the Jardin des Vestiges.

According to the historian Strabo and other ancient sources, the city of Massalia had temples to Apollo and Artemis, but no trace of them remains. The only remaining structure from ancient Massalia are the cellars of Saint-Sauveur, near the Place de Lenche in Marseille. They probably served as either a granary or an arsenal.

The Phocaeans also established colonies at Nice, Arles, Cannes and south of Nîmes. Later the region was also inhabited by Celts, who were also known as the Liguress or Celto-Ligurians. who built oppida, or forts. Little trace remains of their architecture.

== Roman monuments in Provence (20 BC to 476 AD) ==
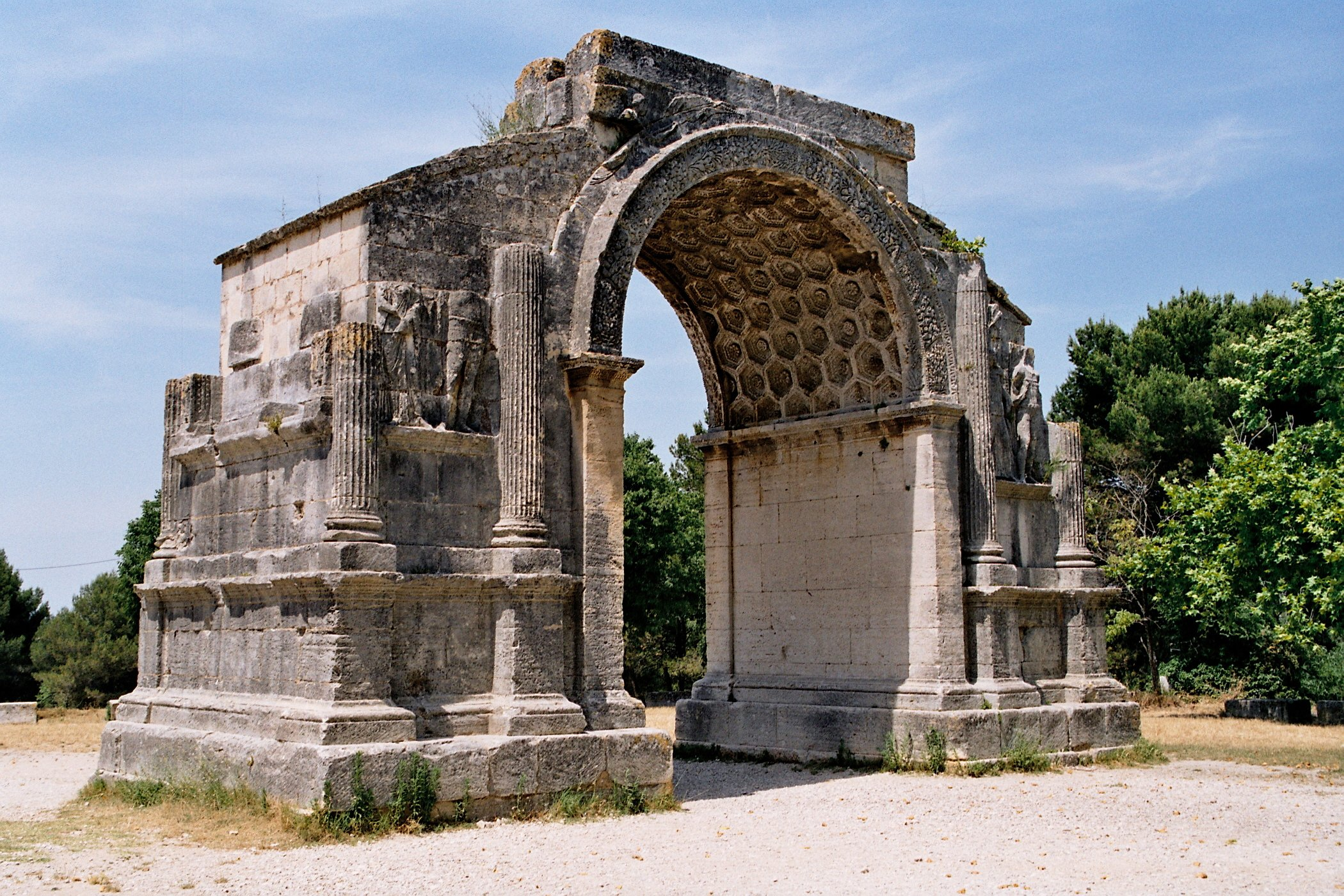
The triumphal arch at Glanum (25 AD)

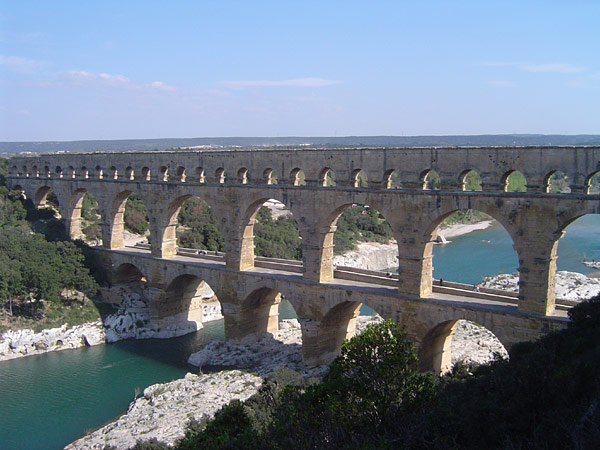
Pont du Gard, 1st century BC

In the 2nd century BC, the Romans began their conquest of the region, sending legions which defeated the Ligurians and destroyed their fortresses. In 123 BC the Romans founded Aquae Sextiae, and two years later began a new town at Nemausa (today Nîmes.) The Roman colony known as provincia was organized in about 120 BC. A Roman road, the Via Domitia, named for Roman Consul Domitius Ahenobarbus, was built to connect Rome with the Pyrenees, following the path of the old Greek Way of Hercules. It led to a great expansion of commerce in the region.

In the 1st century BC, Roman legions completed the conquest of Gaul and began building towns, triumphal arches, amphitheatres, theatres, public baths and aqueducts in Provence.

The Roman aqueduct of Pont du Gard (1st century AD), built during the time of the Emperor Claudius, is one of the most impressive examples of Roman civil engineering. Fifty meters above the Gardon, it is the highest existing Roman aqueduct. The aqueduct carried water a distance of fifty kilometres.

The Triumphal Arch of Orange at Orange, Vaucluse, was probably built to honor the veterans of the 11th legion in about twenty BC, during the time of the Emperor Augustus, and was later dedicated to the Emperor Tiberius. It was designed to show travellers to the new Roman province the superiority and power of Rome.

The triumphal arch near the Roman town of Glanum, just outside Saint-Rémy-de-Provence, shows Roman soldiers leading away defeated prisoners. It was constructed between 10 and 25 AD, sometime after the Romans had conquered the town, which was inhabited by Celto-Ligurians. Glanum was destroyed in 260 AD. by the Alamanni, a Germanic tribe, as the Roman Empire began to crumble.

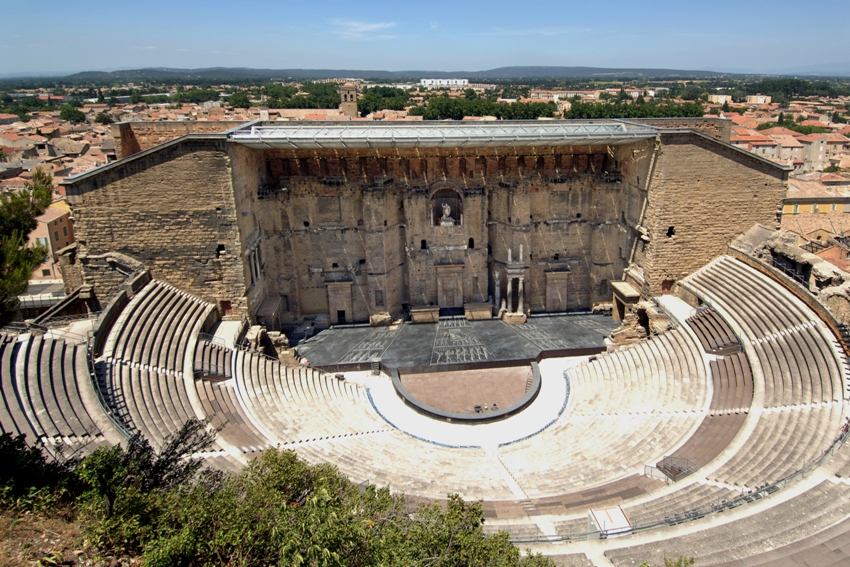
The Roman Theater in Orange, Vaucluse (1st century AD)

The Roman theatre in Orange, Vaucluse, was constructed by the Emperor Augustus in the early 1st century BC, is the best-preserved Roman theatre in Europe. It was closed by the authorities of the Christian church in 391 because of its "barbaric spectacles" and not re-opened until the 19th century. Today, it is the home of music and theatre festivals.

The Arles Amphitheatre was built in the 1st and 2nd centuries AD, when Arles was the capital of Roman Provence. It was used for combat by gladiators and other spectacles. It has a diameter of 102 meters, and could hold twelve thousand spectators.

The Maison Carrée in Nîmes, built in 16–19 BC, is one of the best-preserved Roman temples in the former Roman Empire. It survived intact because it was converted into a Christian church in the 4th century AD. It was built according to the principles of Vitruvius, the chief theoretician of ancient Roman architecture. In the early 19th century, it was chosen as the model for the church of the Madeleine in Paris.

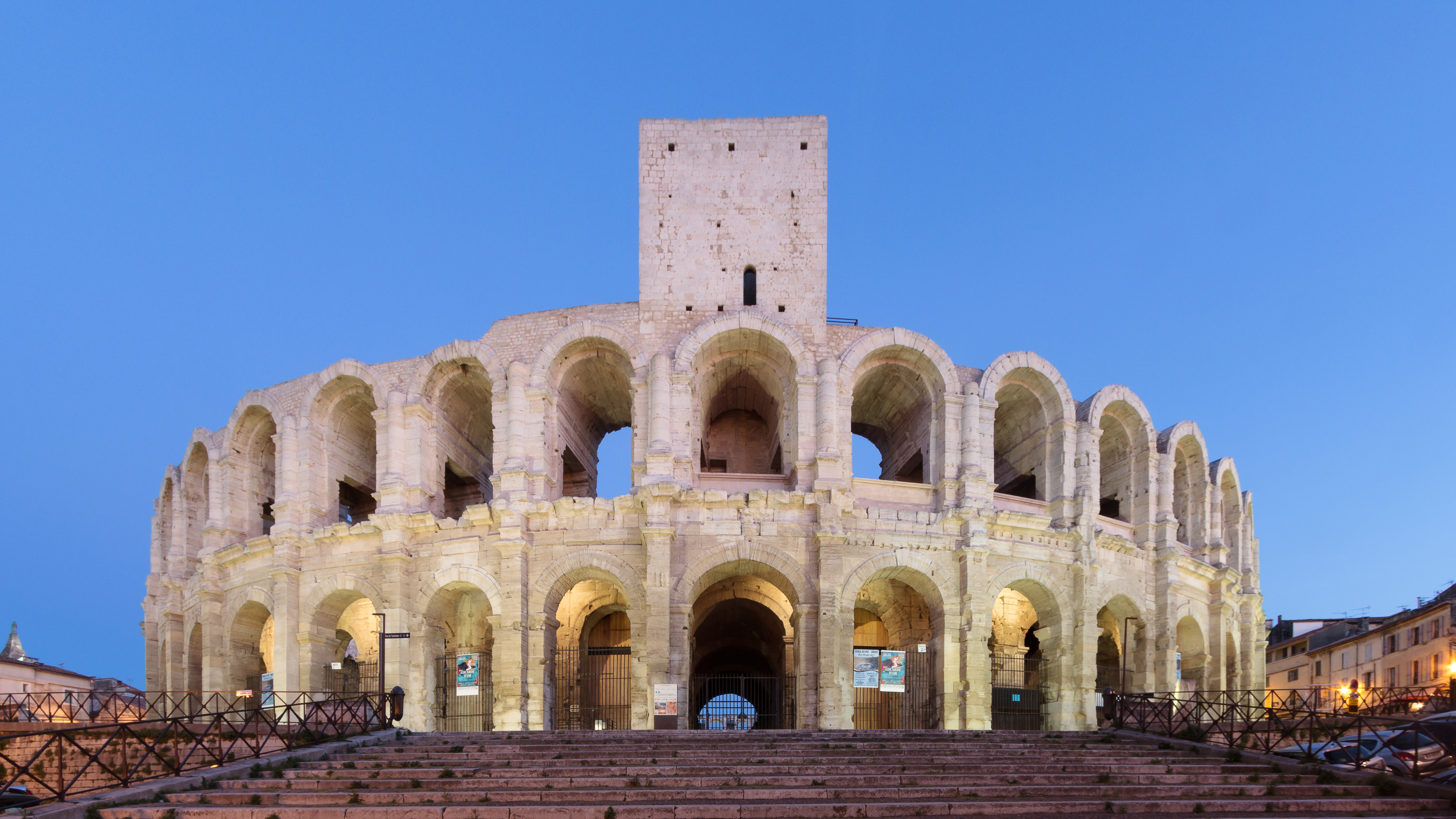
The Roman amphitheatre at Arles (2nd century AD)

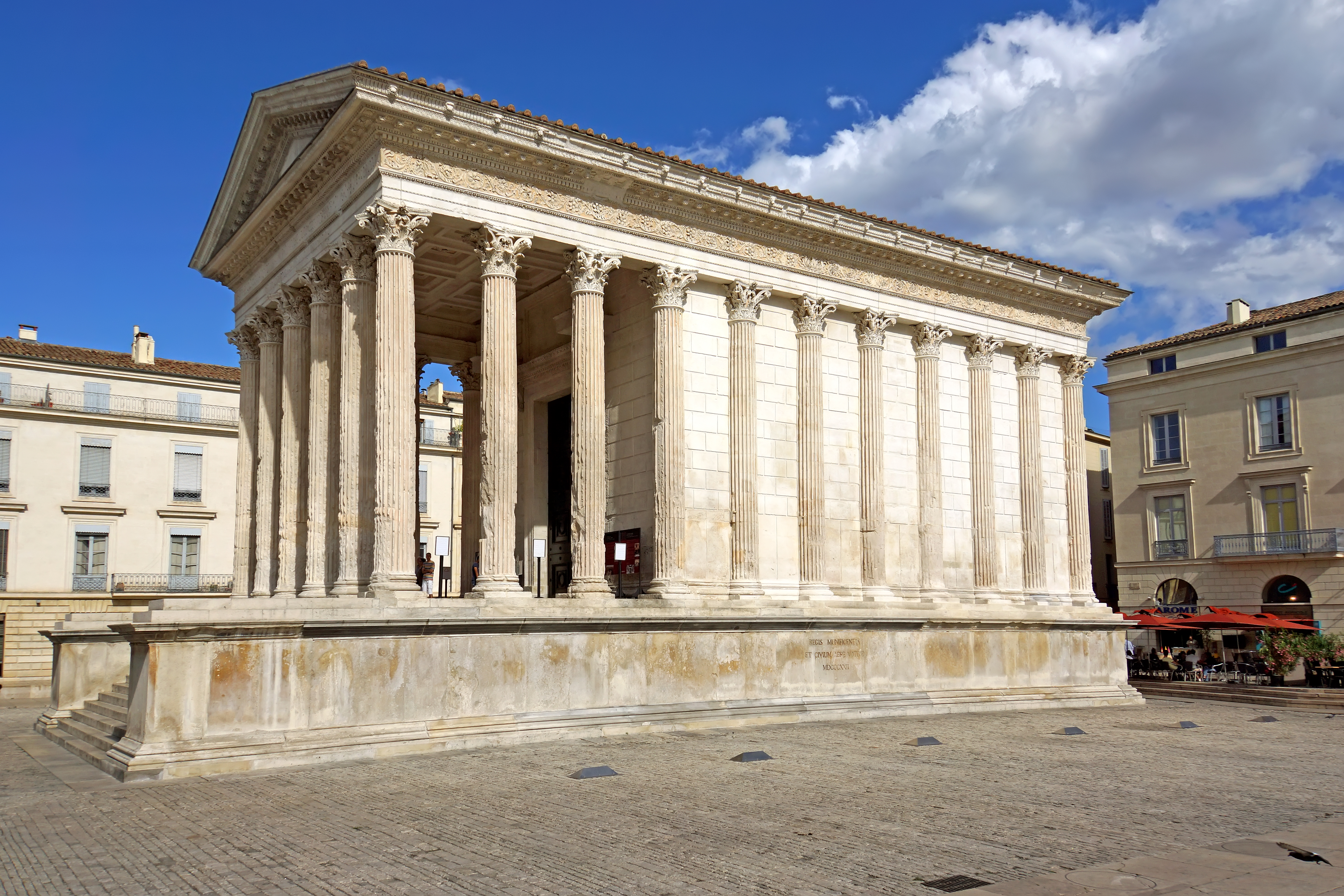
The Maison Carrée, Nîmes (16–19 BC.)

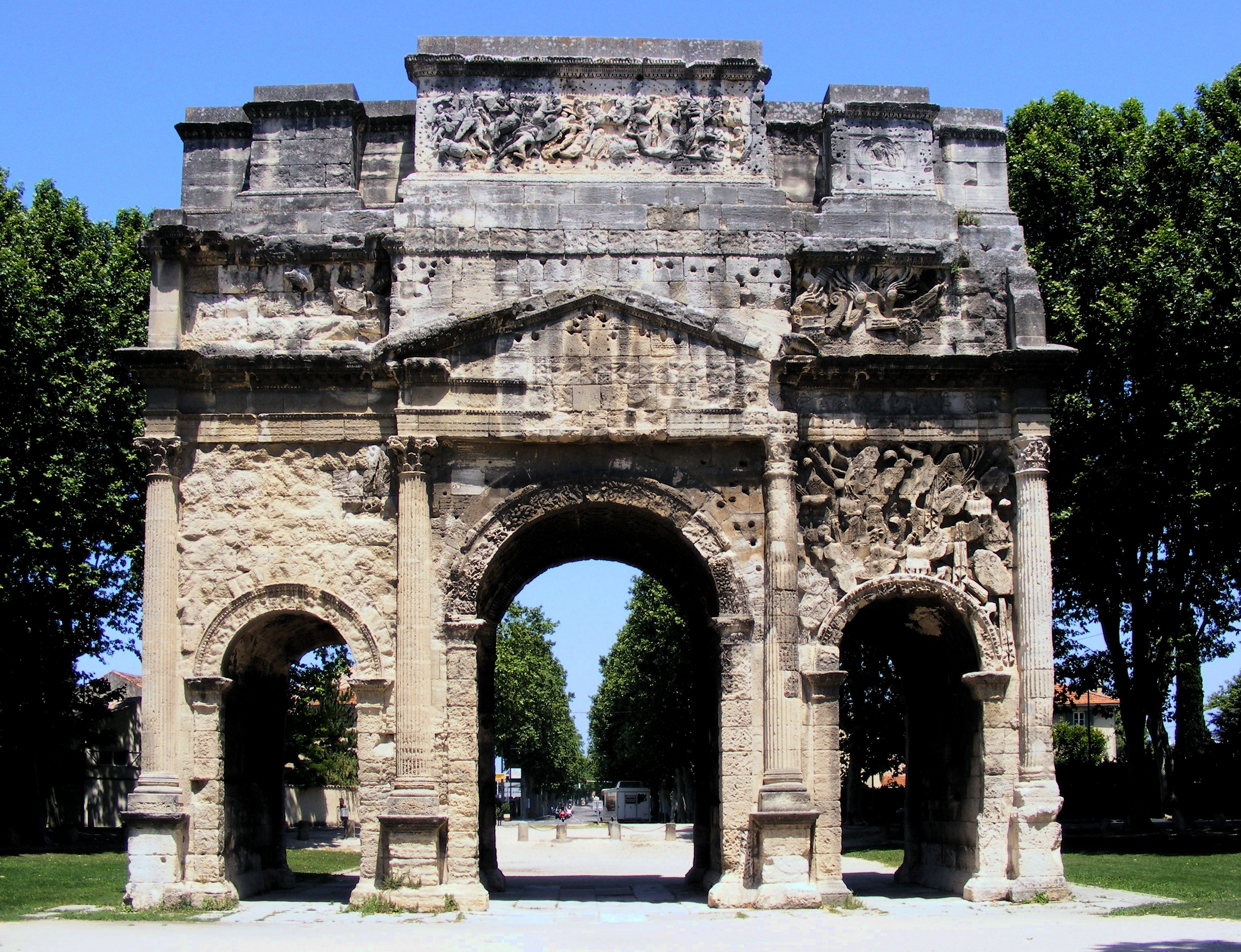
The Triumphal Arch of Orange in Orange, Vaucluse (20 BC)

== Romanesque architecture in Provence (5th–13th centuries) ==
In 380 AD, Christianity became the official religion of the Roman Empire and Christian churches, cathedrals and monasteries were founded all across Provence. Sometimes Roman temples, such as the temple at Nîmes, were turned into churches. Often churches were built on the sites of Roman temples or fora (Arles and Aix-en-Provence) and used columns, such as the columns in the baptistery at Fréjus, and other elements of Roman temples.

Many of the churches were built in a new style, later called Romanesque, which combined Gallo-Roman architectural elements with elements of a new style coming from Lombardy in Italy. It was particularly influenced by the new churches in the Byzantine style in Ravenna. The Romanesque architecture of Provence and the valley of the Rhône had some regional decorative elements, borrowed from the Gallo-Romans, particularly the use of eagles and busts, traditional ancient Roman elements, to decorate the capitals of Corinthian columns.

The baptistery of the Fréjus Cathedral (406–409 AD), built shortly before the Fall of the Western Roman Empire, is the oldest Christian structure in Provence, and one of the oldest buildings in France. The octagonal building, about seven metres across, is covered by a dome set on arches supported by columns. In the center of the building is an octagonal baptismal font 1.3 meters deep and 92 centimetres long, large enough for the person baptized to be immersed in the water. It was only discovered in 1925, hidden behind later modifications to the church, and restored.

Montmajour Abbey (French: Abbaye Notre Dame de Montmajour) is a fortified Benedictine monastery built between the 10th and 13th century on what was then an island five kilometres north of Arles, in the Bouches-du-Rhône département. The Abbey is famous for its 11th–14th century graves, carved in the rock, its subterranean crypt, and its massive unfinished church. It was an important pilgrimage site during the Middle Ages, and in the 18th century it was the site of a large Maurist Monastery, now in ruins.

In the 12th century, monks of the Benedictine Order broke away to form a new order, the Cistercians, who adhered strictly to the rules of St. Benedict. Cistercian monasteries were located in remote valleys next to rivers, were devoted to prayer, meditation, and manual labor, and were built following religious principles to avoid anything that would distract the monks from their prayers.

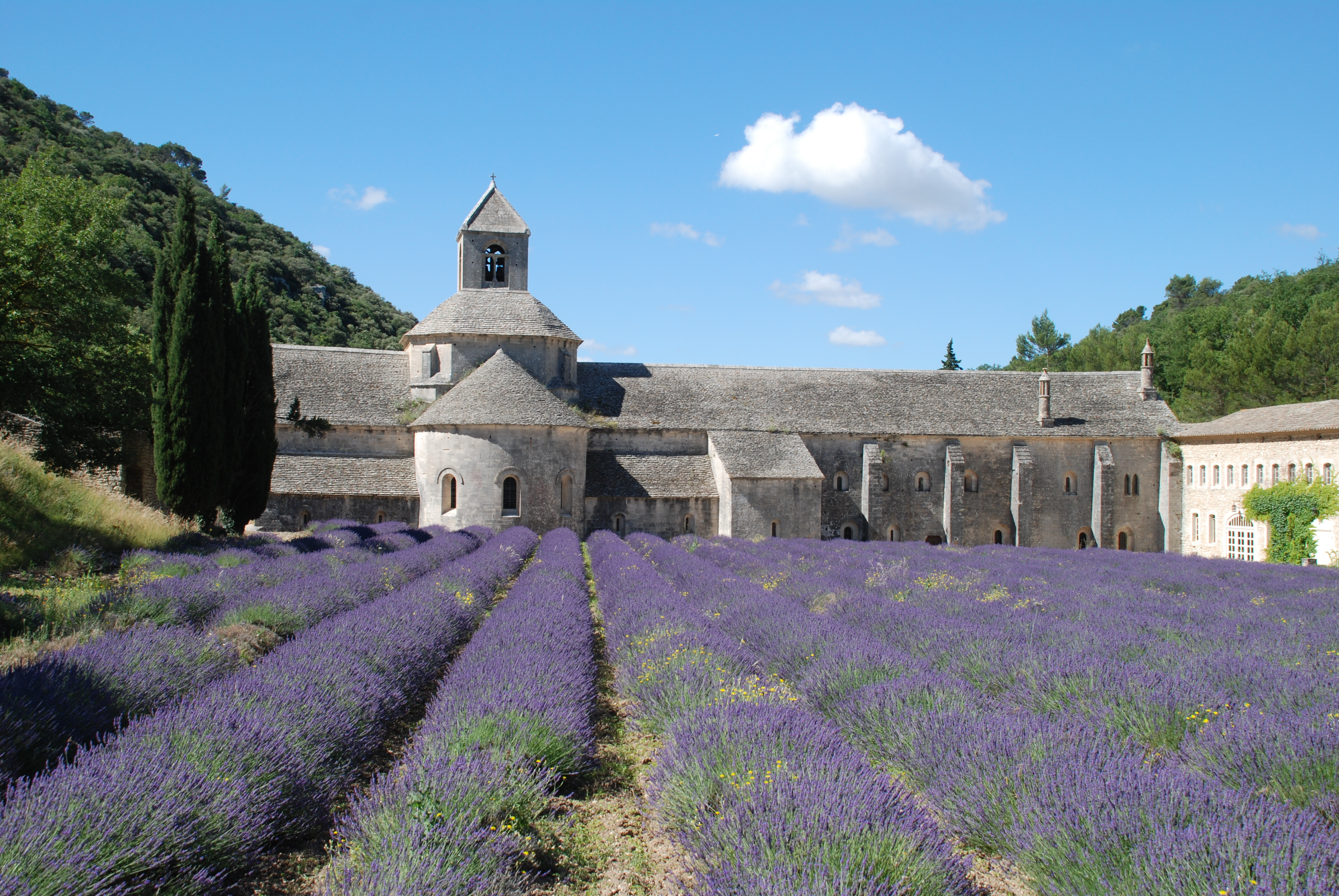
Sénanque Abbey, near Gordes (1178)

Sénanque Abbey was the first Cistercian monastery founded in Provence in 1148. The church was finished in 1178. A small community of monks still lives in the Abbey. The lavender fields around the Abbey make it one of the most photographed spots in Provence.

Thoronet Abbey, in a remote valley near Draguignan, in the Var department, was founded in 1160. The cloister is among the oldest Cistercian cloisters still existing. Le Corbusier visited the monastery in 1953 and imitated the play of light and shadow in his priory of Sainte Marie de La Tourette, near Lyon. It also influenced the modern monastery by John Pawson at Nový Dvůr Monastery, in the Czech Republic. Thoronet Abbey is now a museum open to visitors.

Silvacane Abbey was founded in 1175, the third of the Cistercian monasteries known as the Three Sisters of Provence. It is located by the Durance River at La Roque-d'Anthéron, between Avignon and Aix-en-Provence. It is open to the public, and is the only one of the three that no longer serves a religious purpose. It hosts prestigious piano and vocal music festivals.

The Church of St. Trophime (Trophimus) is a Roman Catholic church and former cathedral built between the 12th century and the 15th century in the city of Arles, in the Bouches-du-Rhône department. The sculptures over the portal, particularly the Last Judgment, and the columns in the adjacent cloister, are considered some of the finest examples of Romanesque sculpture. The church was built upon the site of the 5th century basilica of Arles, named for Saint Stephen. In the 15th century a Gothic choir was added to the Romanesque nave.

Aix Cathedral (Cathédrale Saint-Sauveur d'Aix) in Aix-en-Provence shows the transition from Romanesque to Gothic architecture. It is built on the site of the 1st century Roman forum of Aix, and was re-built from the 12th until the 19th century; it includes Romanesque, Gothic and Neo-Gothic elements, as well as Roman columns and parts of the baptistery from a 6th-century Christian church.

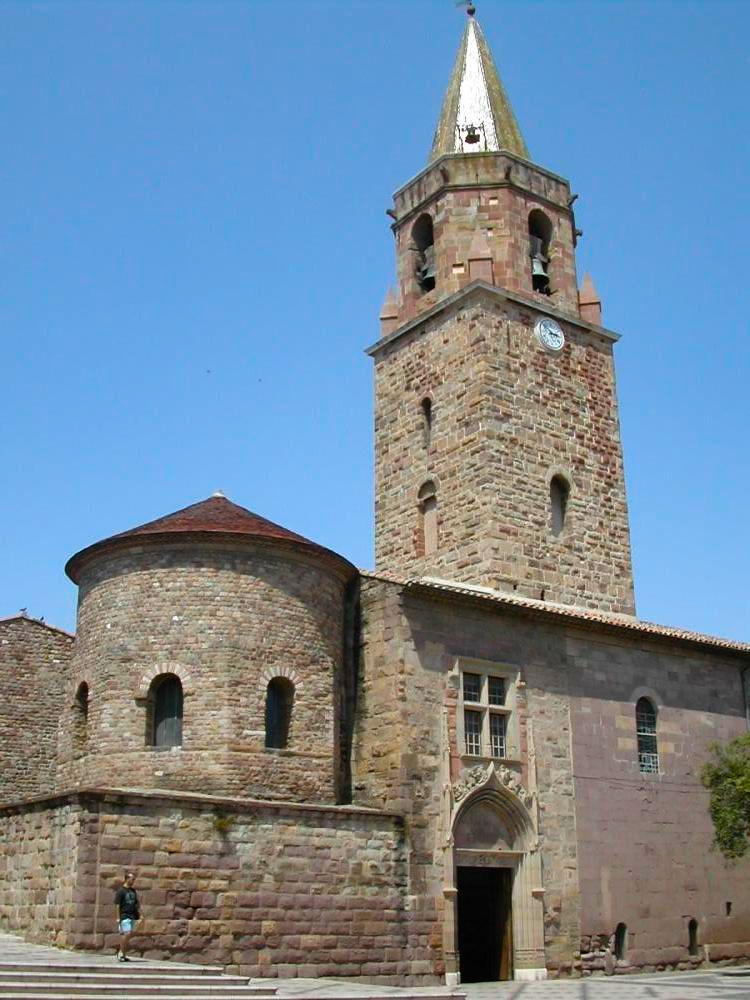
Baptistery of the Fréjus Cathedral in Fréjus (5th century)

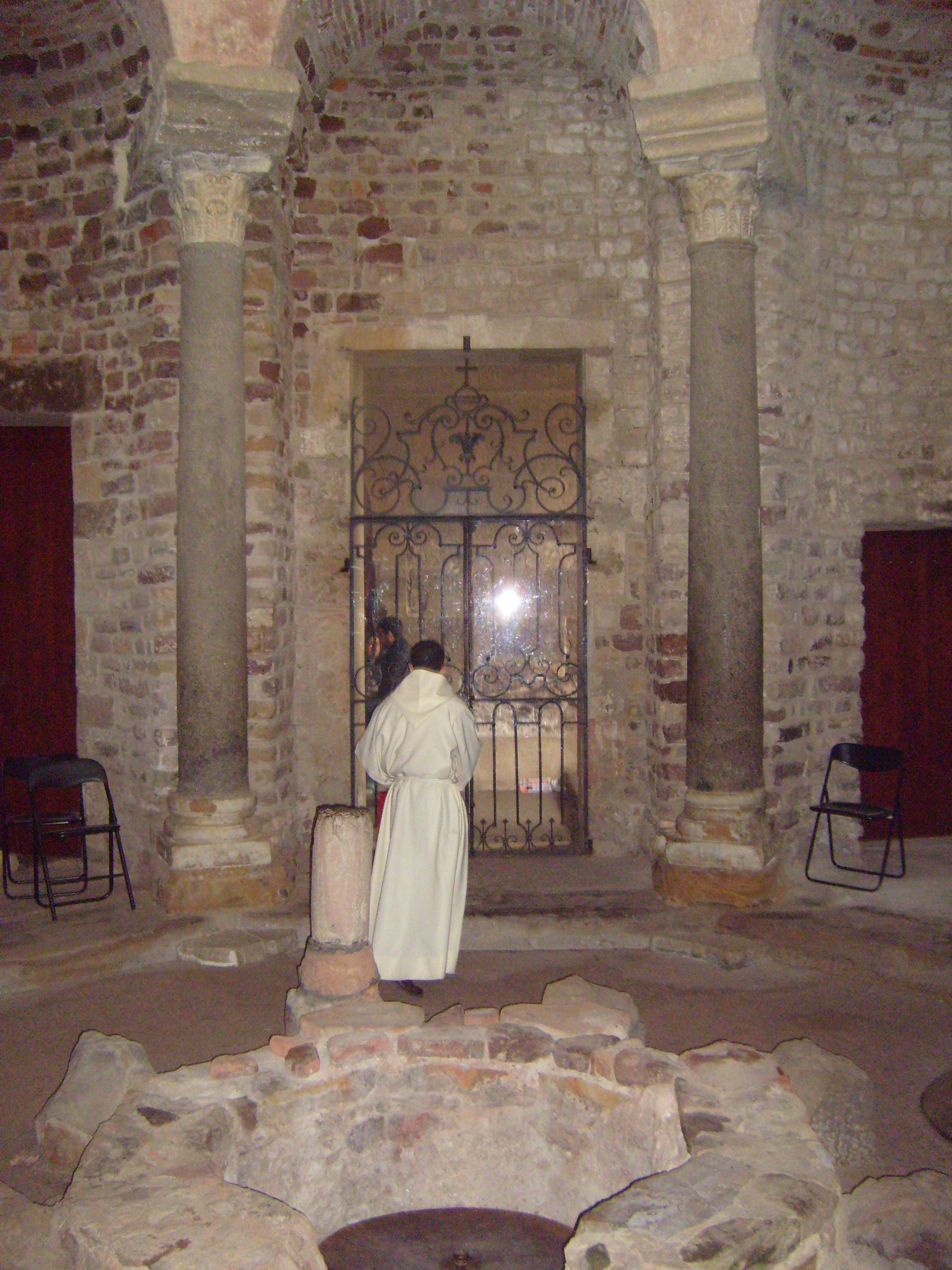
The baptistery of Fréjus Cathedral (5th century) is still in use

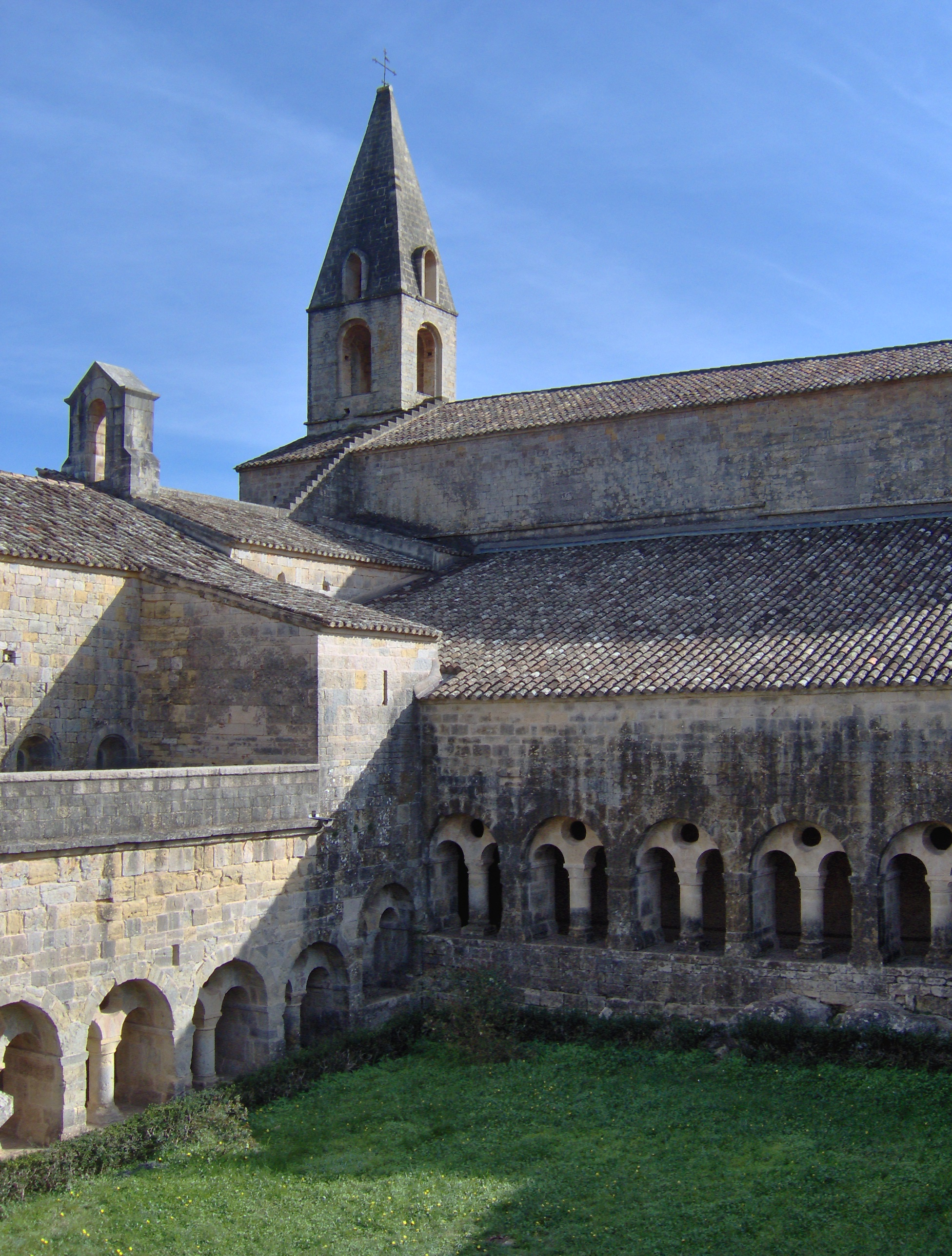
Thoronet Abbey (1160)

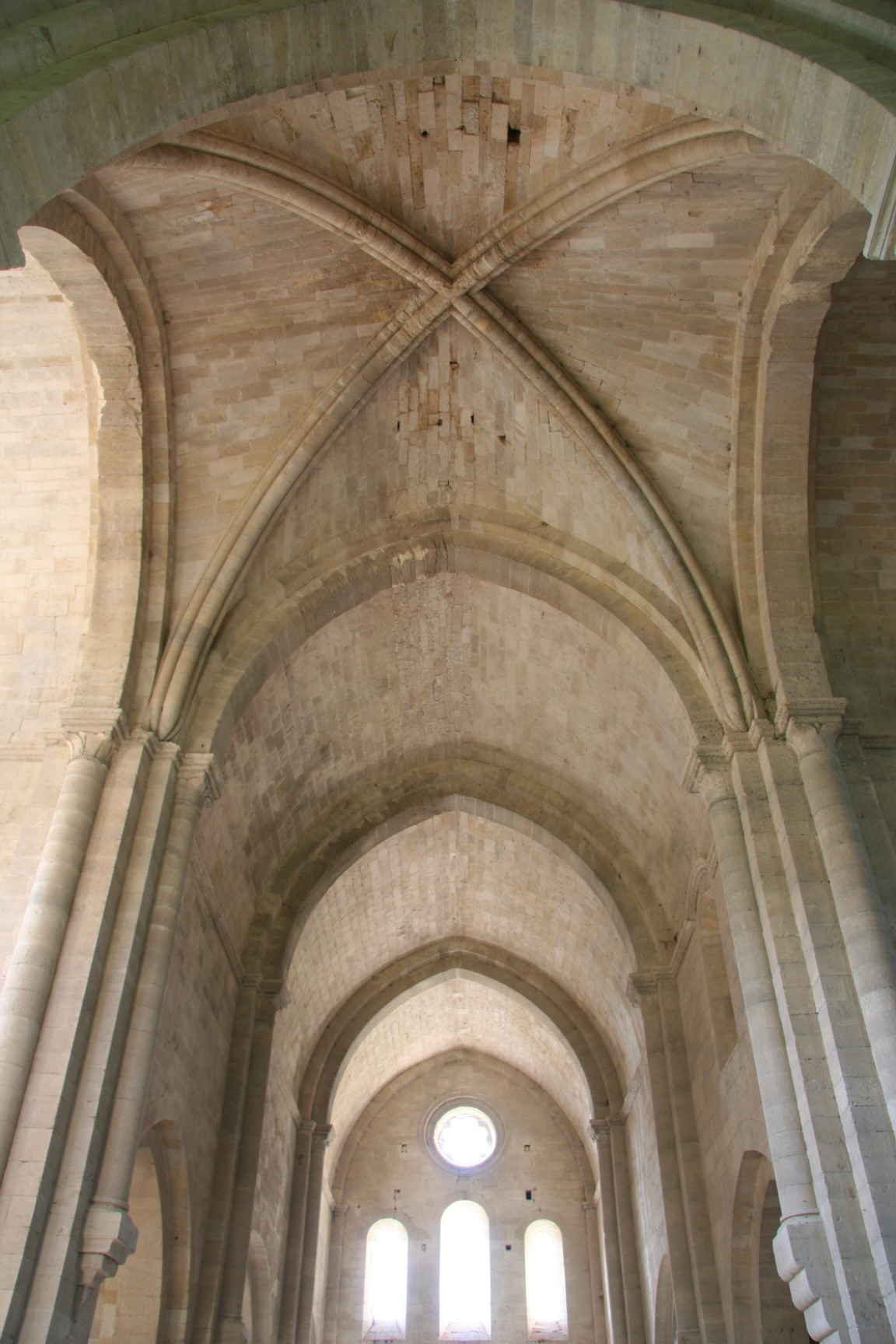
Silvacane Abbey (1175)

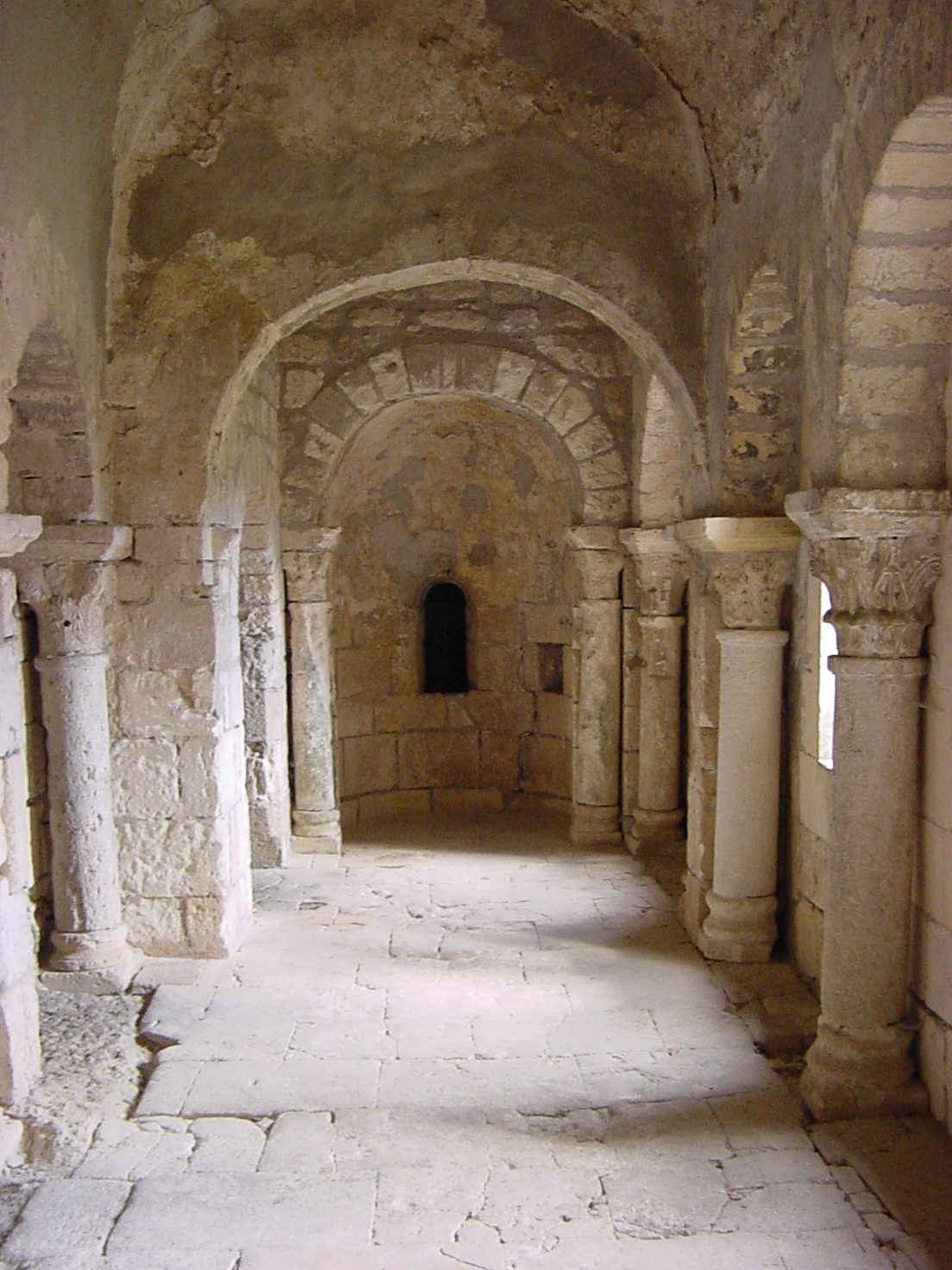
Nave of St. Peter's Chapel of Montmajour Abbey (11th century)

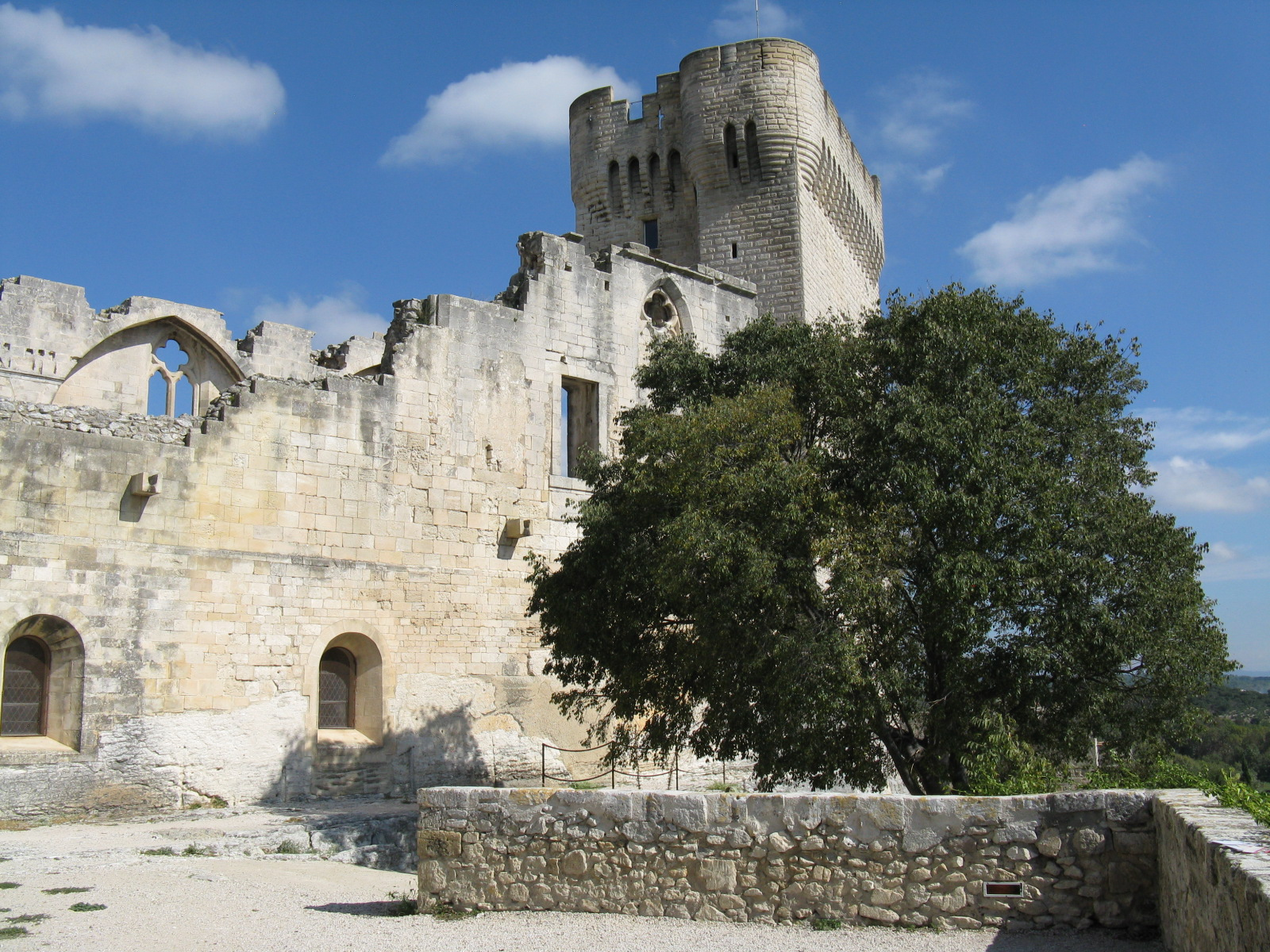
The Pons de l'Orme tower at Montmajour Abbey (14th century)

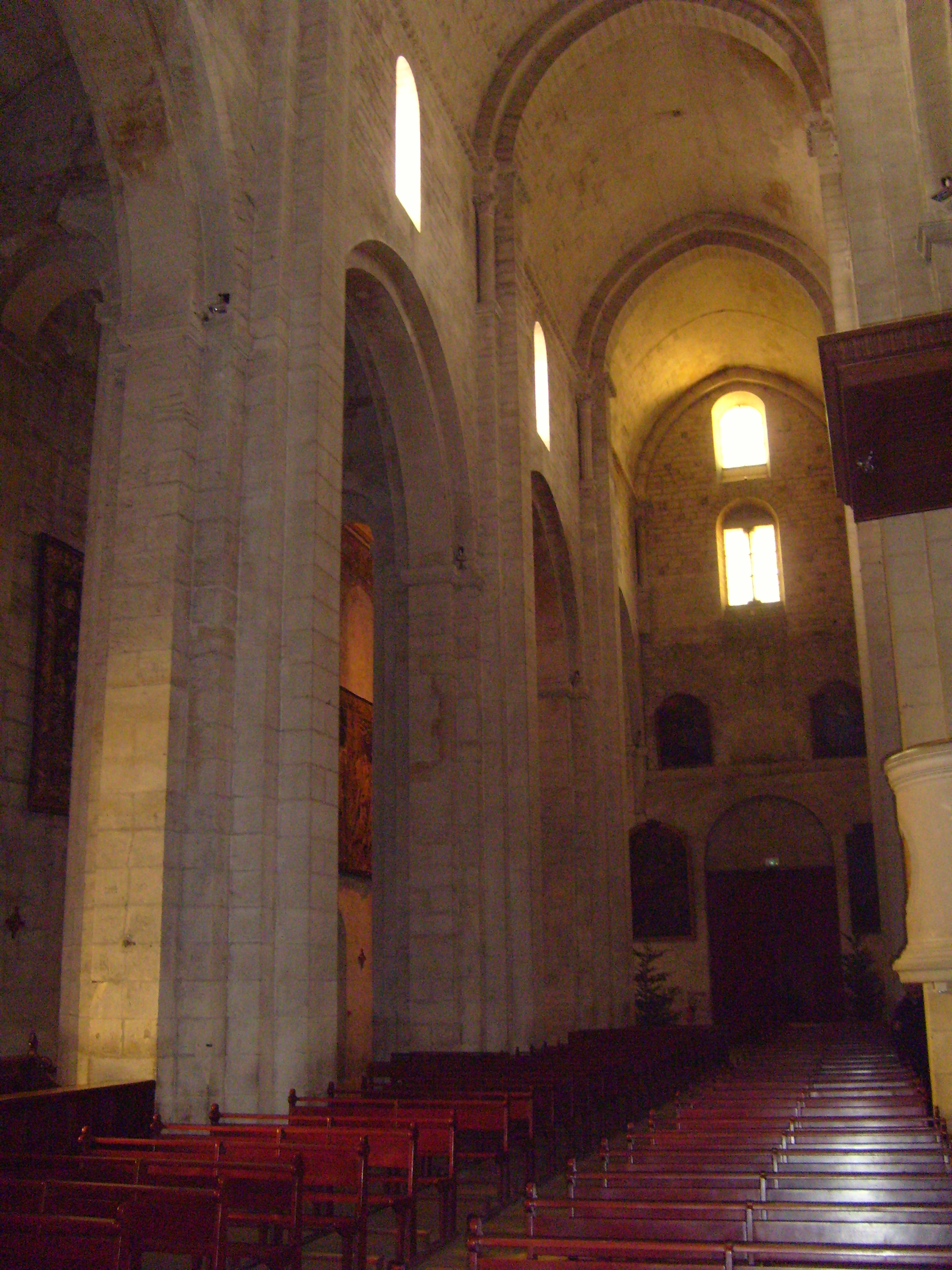
Nave of the Church of St. Trophime, Arles (late 12th century to 15th century

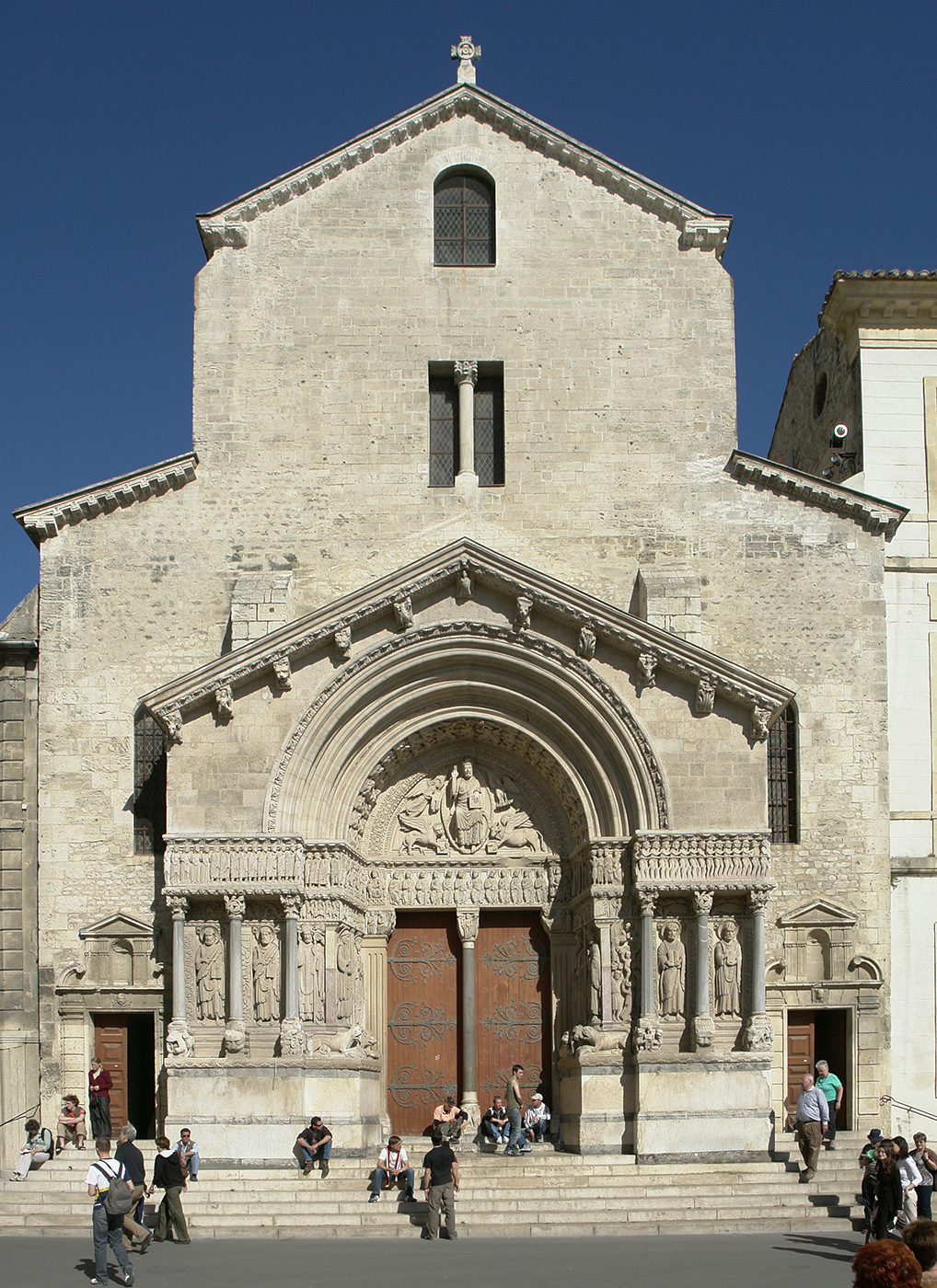
Portal of the Church of St. Trophime, Arles (12th century)

Samson and the lions, Saint Trophime Church Portal (12th century)

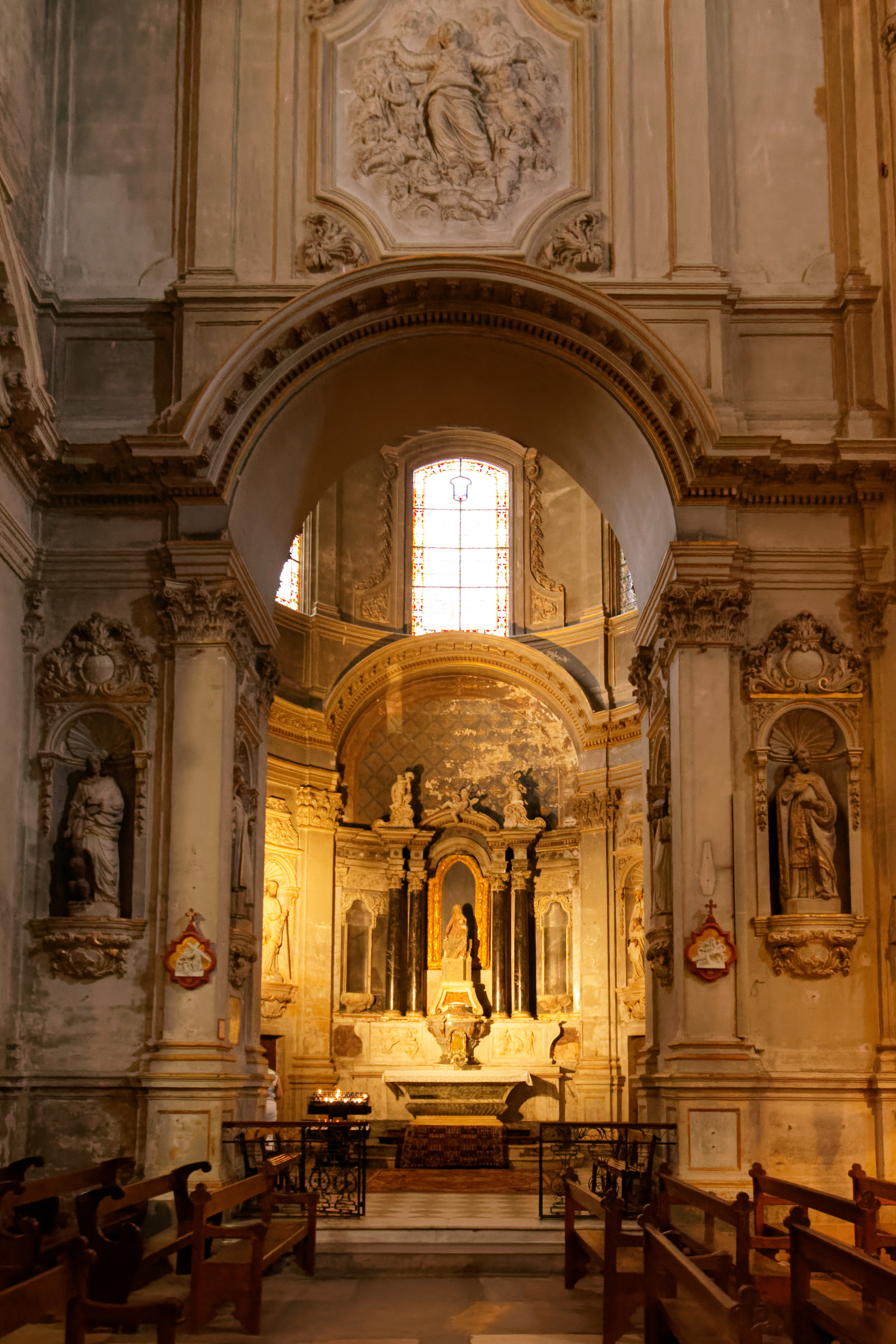
Interior of Aix Cathedral (12th century)

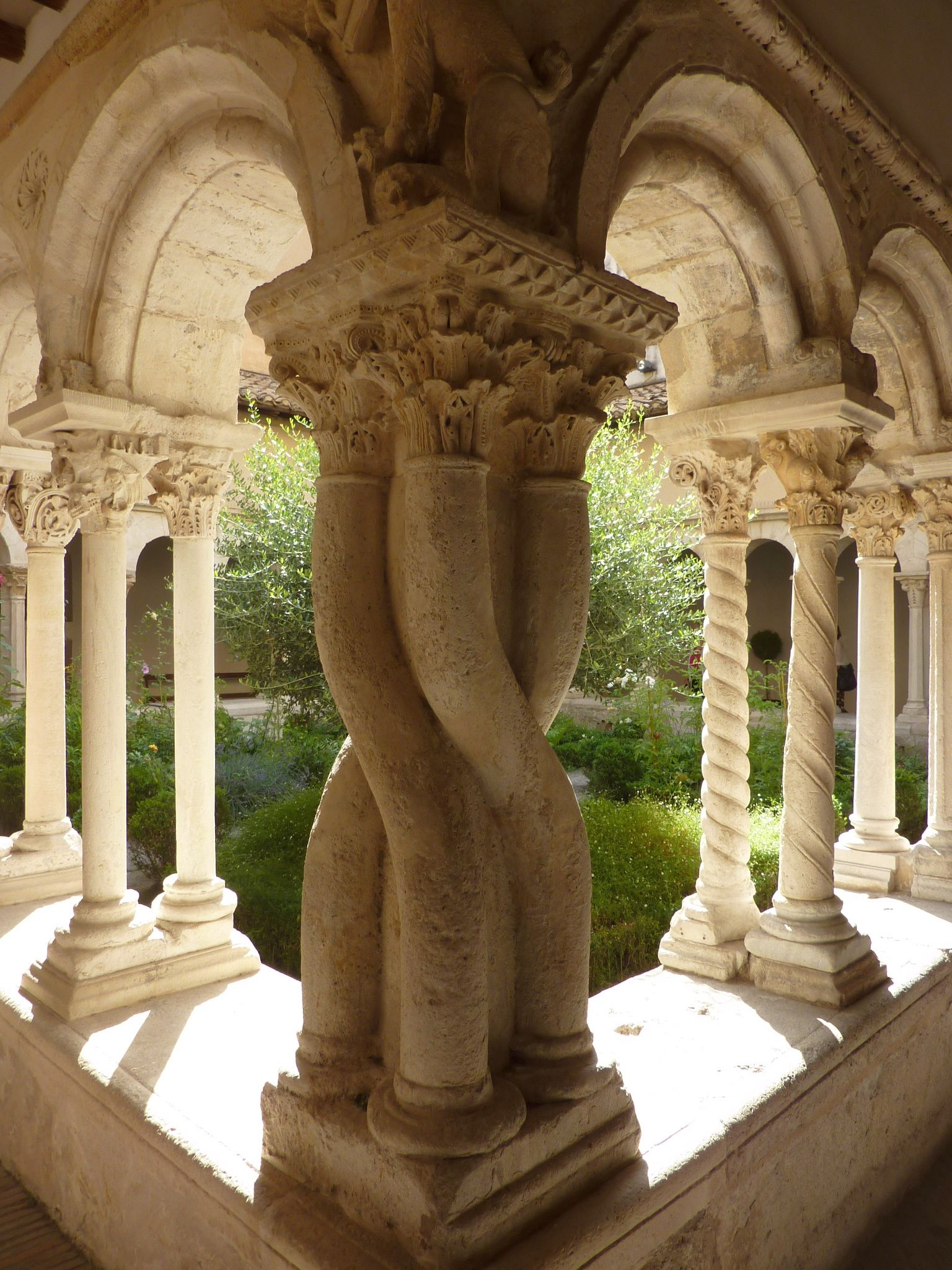
Aix Cathedral Baptistery seen from the Cloister

== Gothic architecture in Provence (12th–14th century) ==
The Gothic architecture style was invented in the middle of the 12th century with the facade of the Basilica of Saint-Denis in Paris, and spread rapidly to England and Germany, but did not arrive in Provence until the late 13th century.

The first purely Gothic church in Provence was the Basilica Sainte Marie-Madeleine in Saint-Maximin-la-Sainte-Baume, which was begun in 1295. It was built to contain what was believed to be the sarcophagus of Mary Magdalene, which was discovered in a Gallo-Roman crypt in Saint-Maximin in 1279. The basilica was consecrated in 1316, but the Black Death in 1348, which killed half the local population, interrupted construction. Work started again in 1404, and the sixth bay of the nave was completed in 1412. Work continued until 1532, when it was decided to leave the basilica just as it was, with an unfinished west front, and neither a portal nor bell towers. The church today has a main apse flanked by two subsidiary apses. The nave has no transept, and is flanked by sixteen chapels in the aisles. In the crypt is displayed what is said to be the skull of St. Mary Magdalene.

In other parts of Provence, Romanesque churches were transformed into Gothic ones. In Aix-en-Provence, two new wings of the transept of Aix Cathedral were built in the Gothic style between 1285–1230, and the cathedral was turned bay by bay into a Gothic church, paralleled the growth of importance of Aix. In Arles, a Gothic choir replaced the Romanesque apse of the Church of St. Trophime between 1445 and 1465.

The finest Gothic building in Provence was the Palais des Papes in Avignon, which became the residence of the Popes when Pope Clement V moved the Papal Curia to Avignon, a period known as the Avignon Papacy. The Palace was one of the largest and most important buildings in Europe. Construction was begun by Pope Benedict XII and continued by his successors. The construction of the 10-acre (40,000 m^{2}), heavily fortified palace consumed most of the income of the papacy during this period. It served as the residence of two antipopes, Clement VII and Benedict XIII, before the papal court finally returned permanently to Rome. While the outside of the palace looked like a fortress, the inside was lavishly decorated with tapestries, sculptures, and decorated wooden ceilings.

The Pont d'Avignon, also known as the Pont Saint-Bénézet, which crossed the Rhône River between Avignon and Villeneuve-lès-Avignon became one of the wonders of the medieval world. The Romans had built a wooden bridge across the Rhône at the same point, which was replaced by a stone Romanesque bridge built between 1177 and 1185. That bridge, except for four arches, was swept away by a flood in 1226. A new bridge was constructed in the Gothic style between 1234 and 1237, which was 900 metres long, resting on 22 arches. A chapel to Saint Nicholas, with two chapels, one Romanesque and the other Gothic, was located on the bridge fourth arch, where a toll was collected from voyagers in the form of a donation to the Saint.

During the Middle Ages the Avignon bridge was the only bridge across the Rhône between Lyon and the mouth of the Rhône. It was also located on one of the main pilgrimage routes between Italy and Saint-Jacques-Compostelle. The bridge began to collapse in the 17th century, first one arch in 1603, then three more in 1605. These were repaired, but in 1669 a new flood carried away most of the bridge, leaving only four arches.

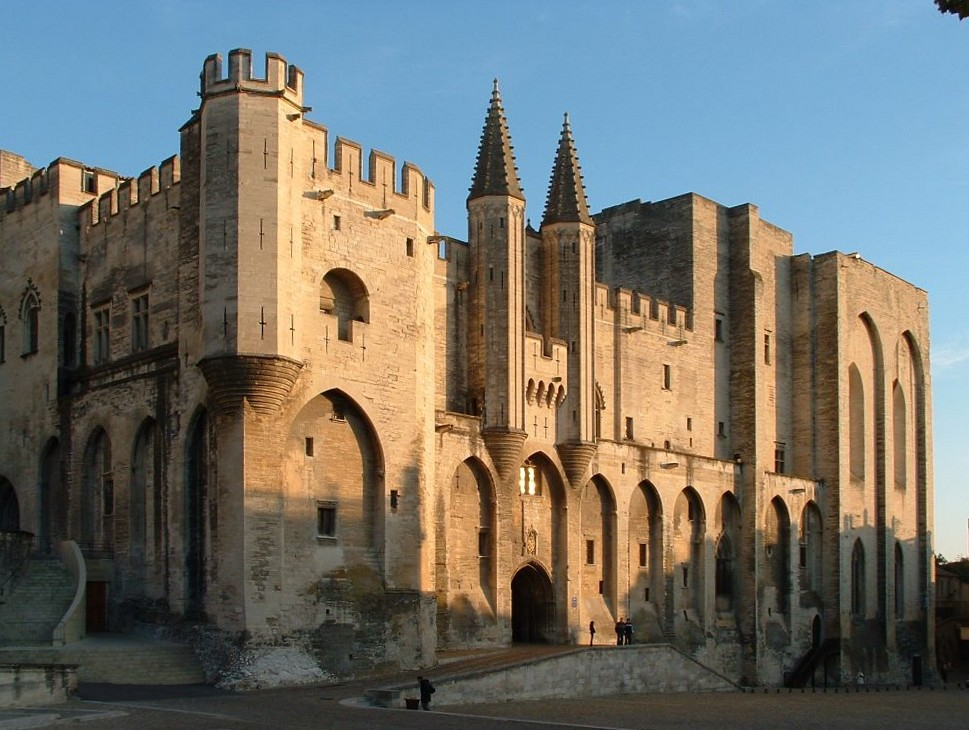
The Palais des Papes in Avignon (1334–1364)

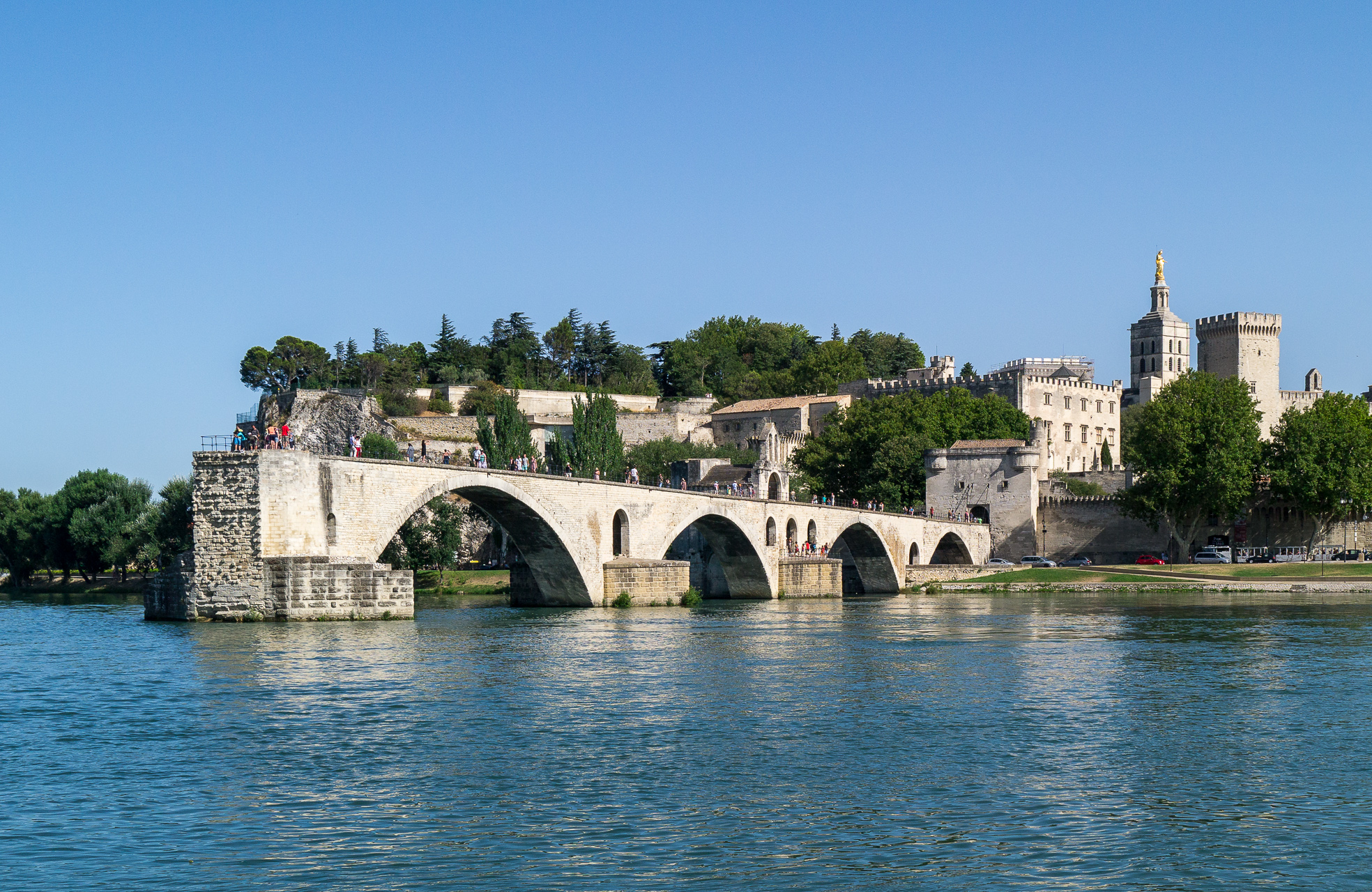
The Pont d'Avignon (13th century)

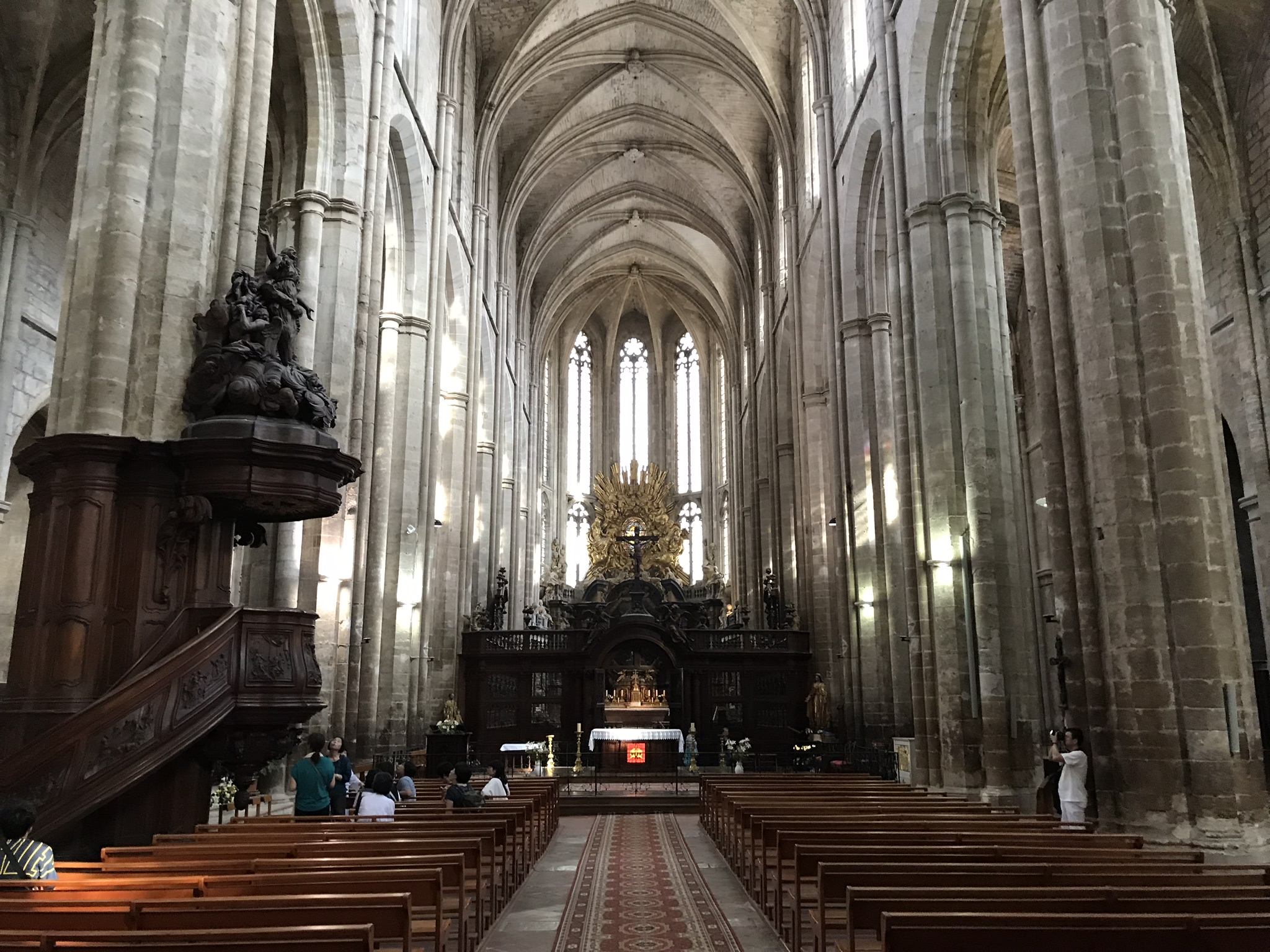
Basilica of St. Mary Magdalene, in Saint-Maximin-la-Sainte-Baume (13th century)

== Hilltop villages (2nd century to 17th century) ==
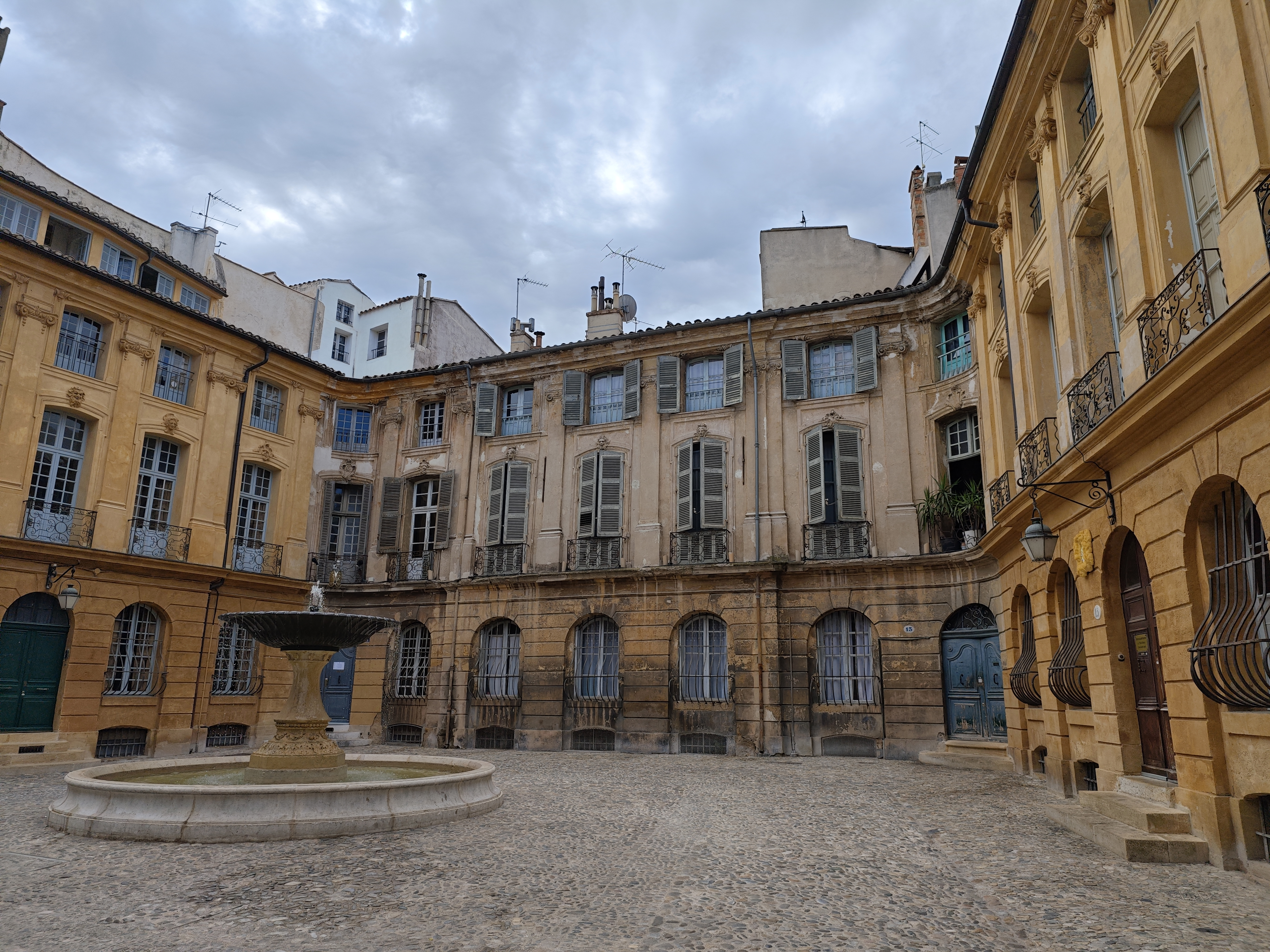
Cobbled square with shuttered historic façades and a central fountain in the old town of Aix-en-Provence.

As Roman authority crumbled in Provence, the region was flooded with invaders: Visigoths in the 5th century, Franks in the 6th century and Arabs in the 8th century, and raids by Berber pirates and slavers. Rule eventually passed to the Counts of Toulouse and the Counts of Barcelona (later Kings of Aragon).

Because of the repeated invasions, Provençal architecture was designed to resist attack. Monasteries were surrounded by towers and walls, and even the bishop's residence in Fréjus resembled a fortress. Castles on hilltops surrounded by walled towns became the characteristic architectural feature of Provence. Only in the 17th century, after the Wars of Religion had ended and the French king had established his authority, were the towns of Provence safe from outside attack.

The village of Roussillon, Vaucluse, in the Luberon area, has vestiges of a 10th-century château and an 11th-century church. It is famous for its pinkish and yellow stone; in the 18th century, mines around the town produced pigment to make the color ochre.

Les Baux-de-Provence, on a high rocky hilltop in the Bouches-du-Rhône department, was inhabited as early as 6000 BC. and had a Celtic fort in the 2nd century AD. In the Middle Ages, the Lords of Les Baux, who claimed ancestry back to Balthazar, one of the Three Kings of the Nativity, ruled over a domain of 79 towns and villages. The Counts were deposed in the 12th century, the last princess died in the 15th century, and the town became part of France. In 1632, when the town became a Protestant stronghold, Cardinal Richelieu ordered castle and town walls destroyed.

Gordes, in the Vaucluse, was originally a hilltop fort of the Celtic tribe of the Vordenses, then a Roman fort guarding the Roman road between Carpentras and Apt. A castle was built by Guillaume d'Agoult in the 9th century, which dominated the valley. In the 13th century, the town joined Savoy in a war against France. In the 14th century, during the Hundred Years' War, the whole town was encircled by strong walls. In 1481, after the death of René I of Naples, Gordes was incorporated into France.

Gordes

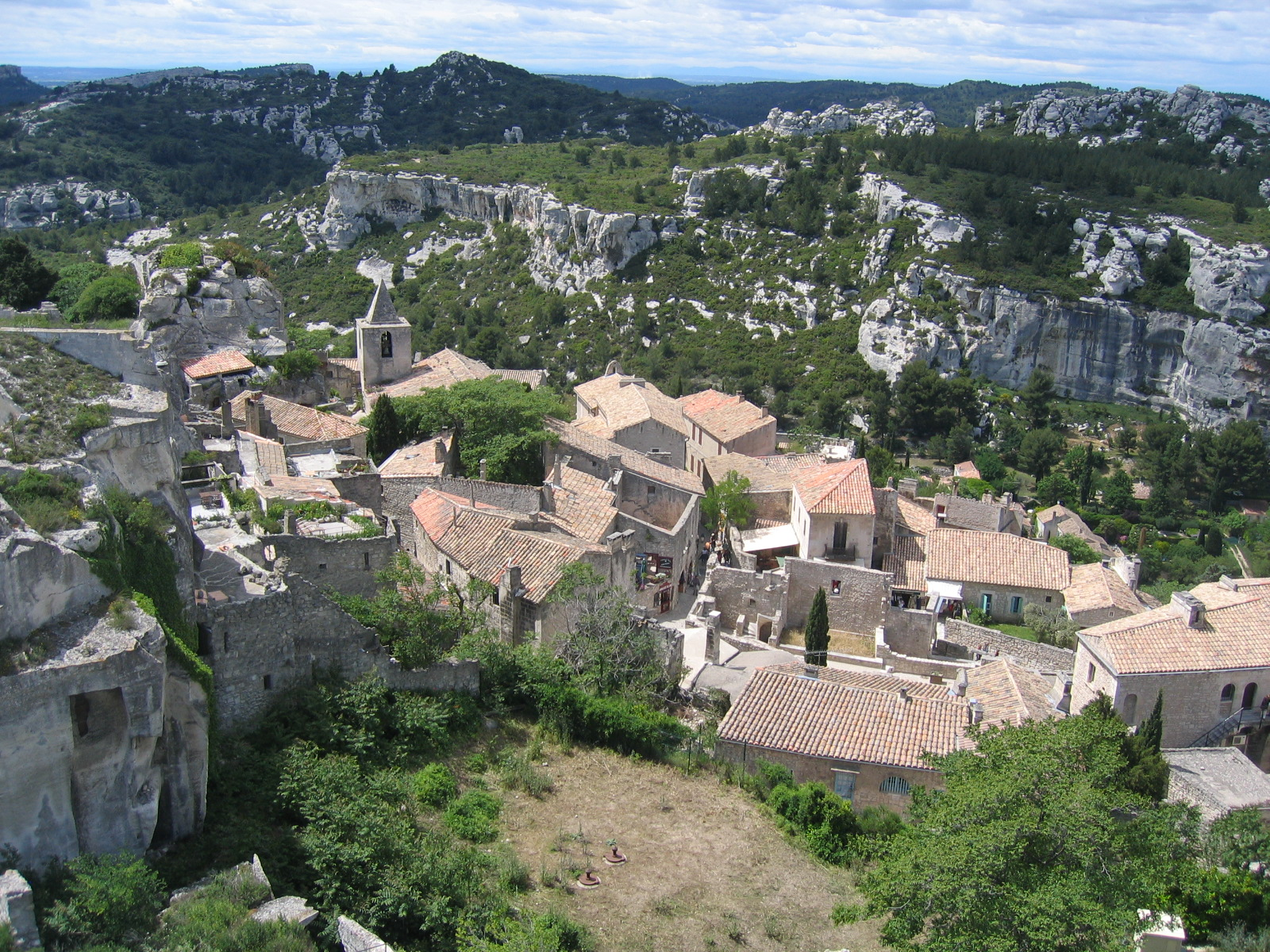
Les Baux-de-Provence

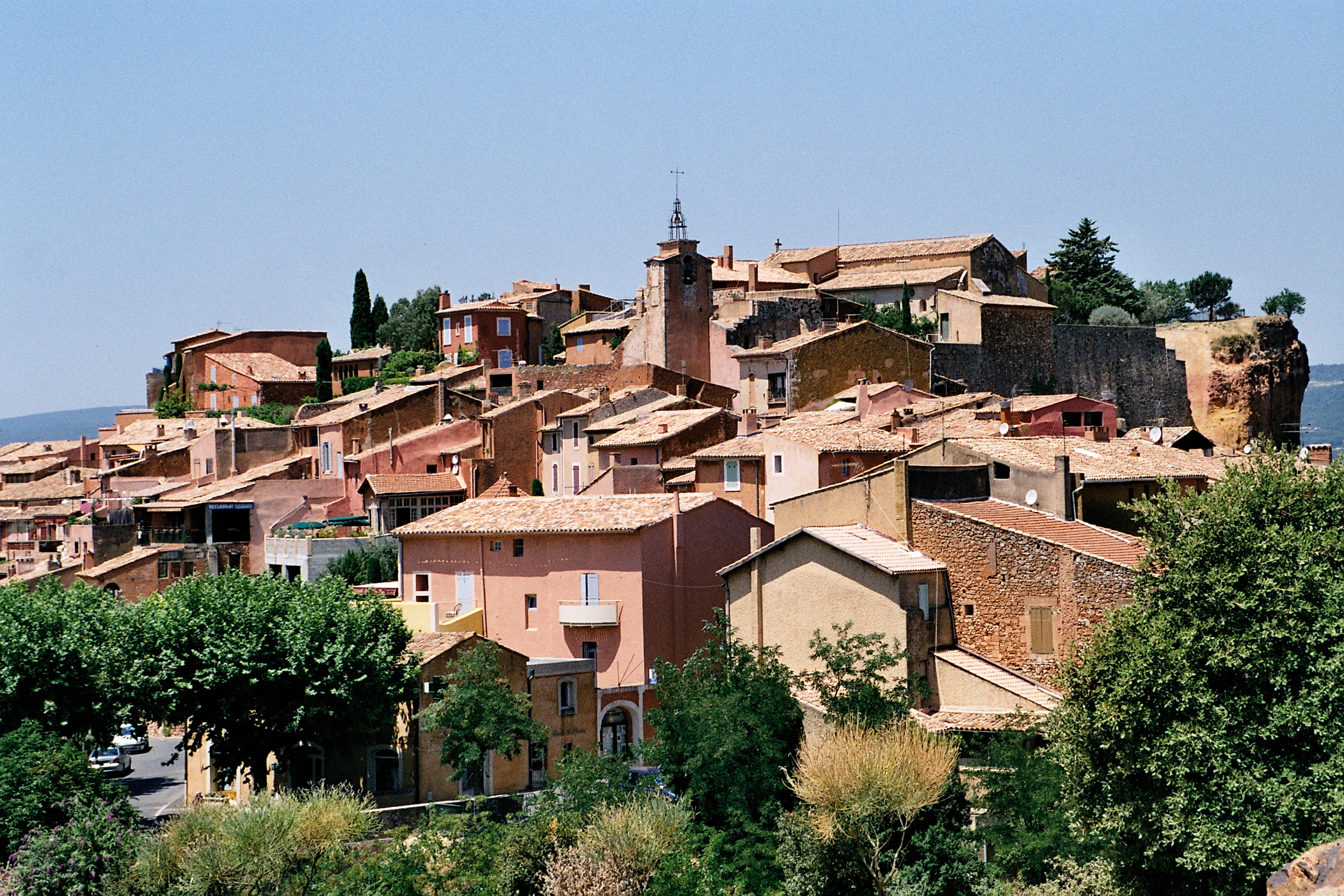
Roussillon

== Castles and fortresses (14th–16th centuries) ==
After Marseille was annexed to France by Francois I in 1481, the Château d'if (1527–1529) was built on one of the islands of the Frioul archipelago in the Bay of Marseille to protect the city from attacks from the sea, and was soon turned into a prison. During the Wars of Religion (1562–1598), it held some 3500 Huguenots, or French Protestant prisoners. It is best known as the prison of the fictional Count of Monte Cristo of Alexandre Dumas, père.

The Château of Tarascon, in the Bouches-du-Rhône department, was begun in 1400 by Louis II of Anjou, and finished by his son, René.

The Citadel of Sisteron, was built on a rocky spur overlooking the Durance River on the strategic route through the Alps to the Mediterranean Sea. A Roman fort and a feudal castle first occupied the site. Then, from 1590 to 1597, Jean Erard, the military architect of king Henry IV, built a new kind of fortification designed to defeat armies with cannons and modern weapons. It featured walls laid out in a sawtooth pattern of recesses and salients, so all parts of the wall could be covered by gunfire; terraces and trenches to slow approaching armies; and interior walls and fortified gates to subdivide the fortress and prevent attackers from capturing it all in one attack. Many of these features were adapted and improved a century later by the military architect Vauban.

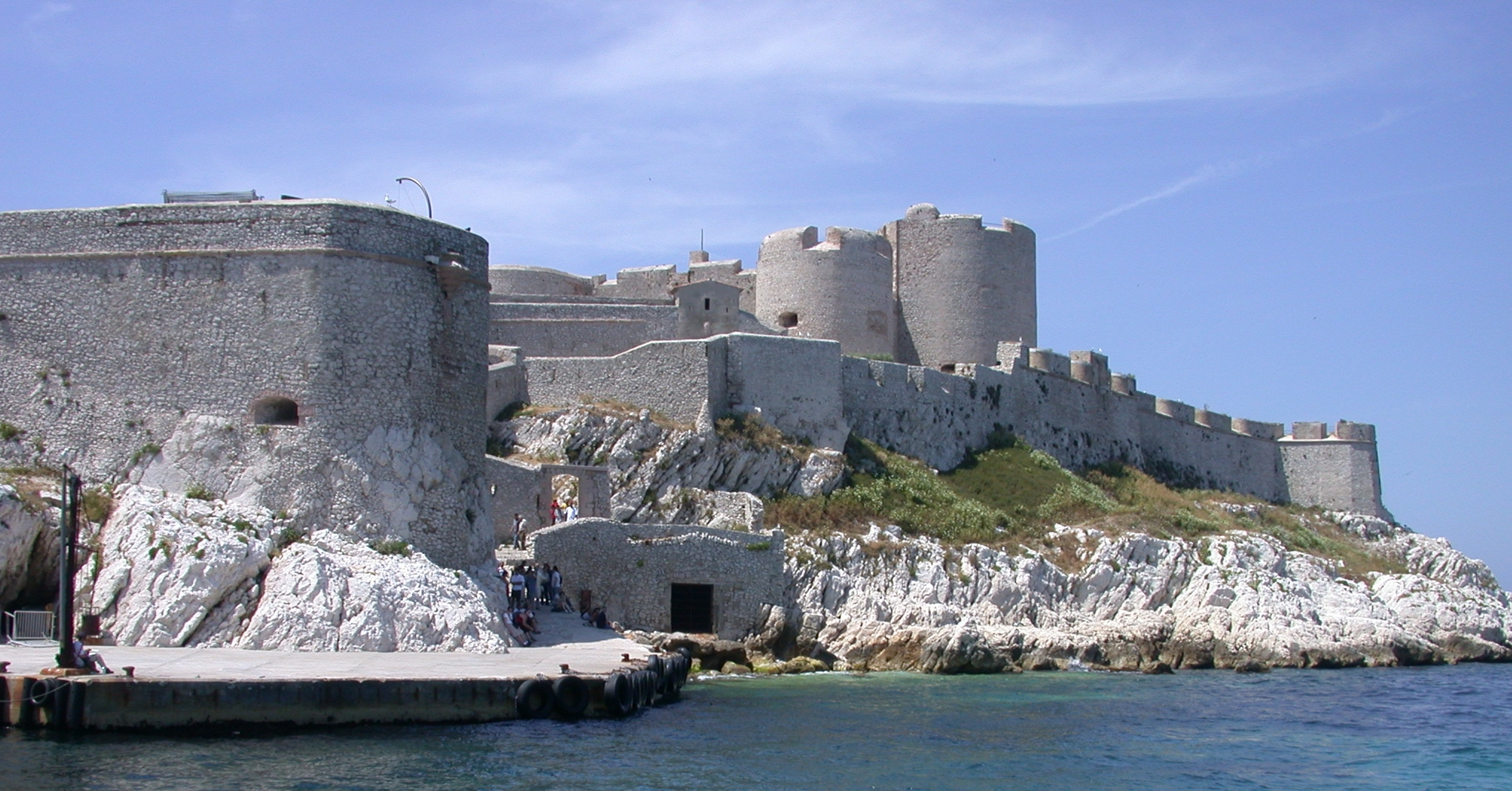
The Chateau d'If (1527–1529)

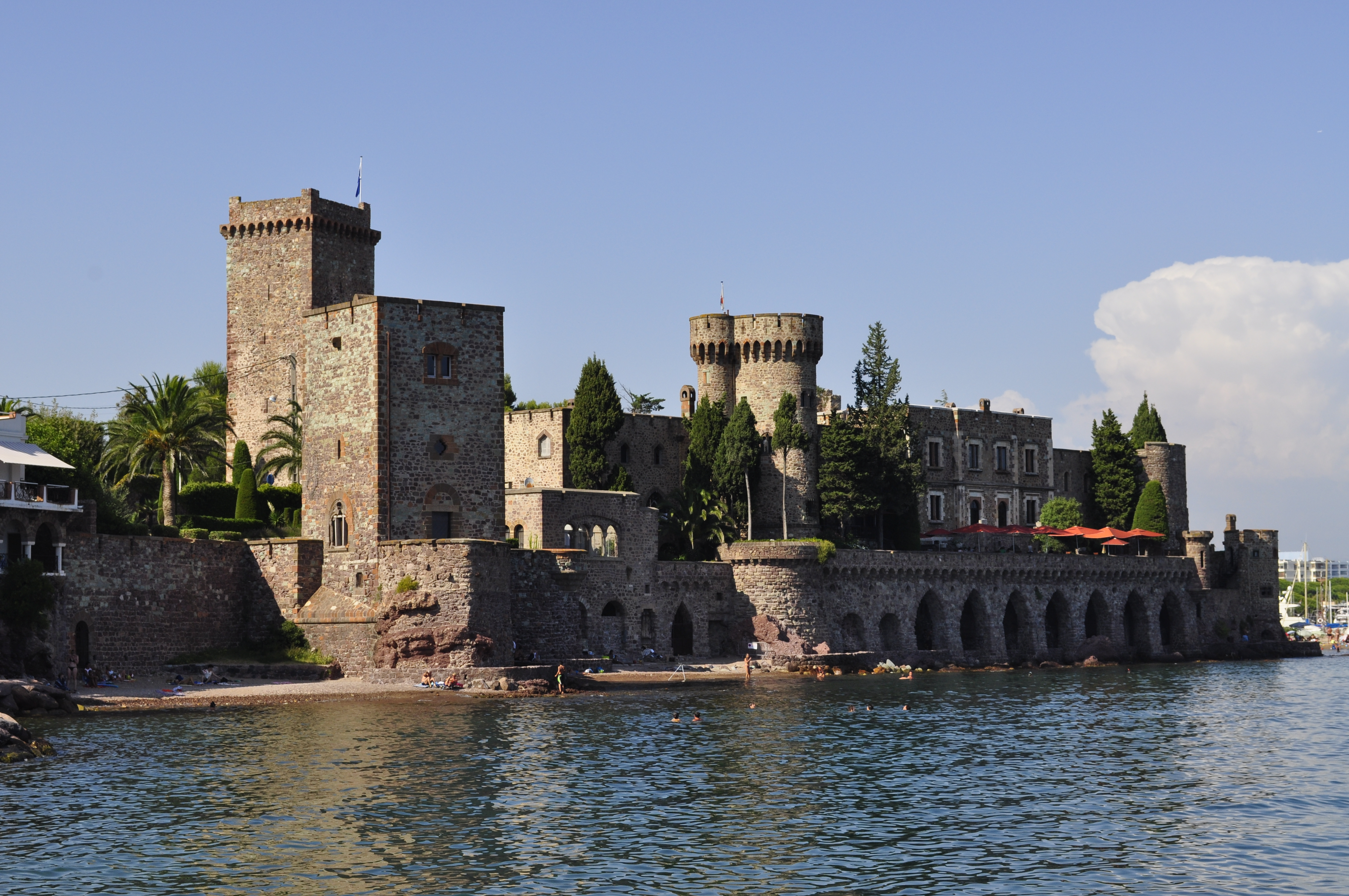
Château de la Napoule (14th century)

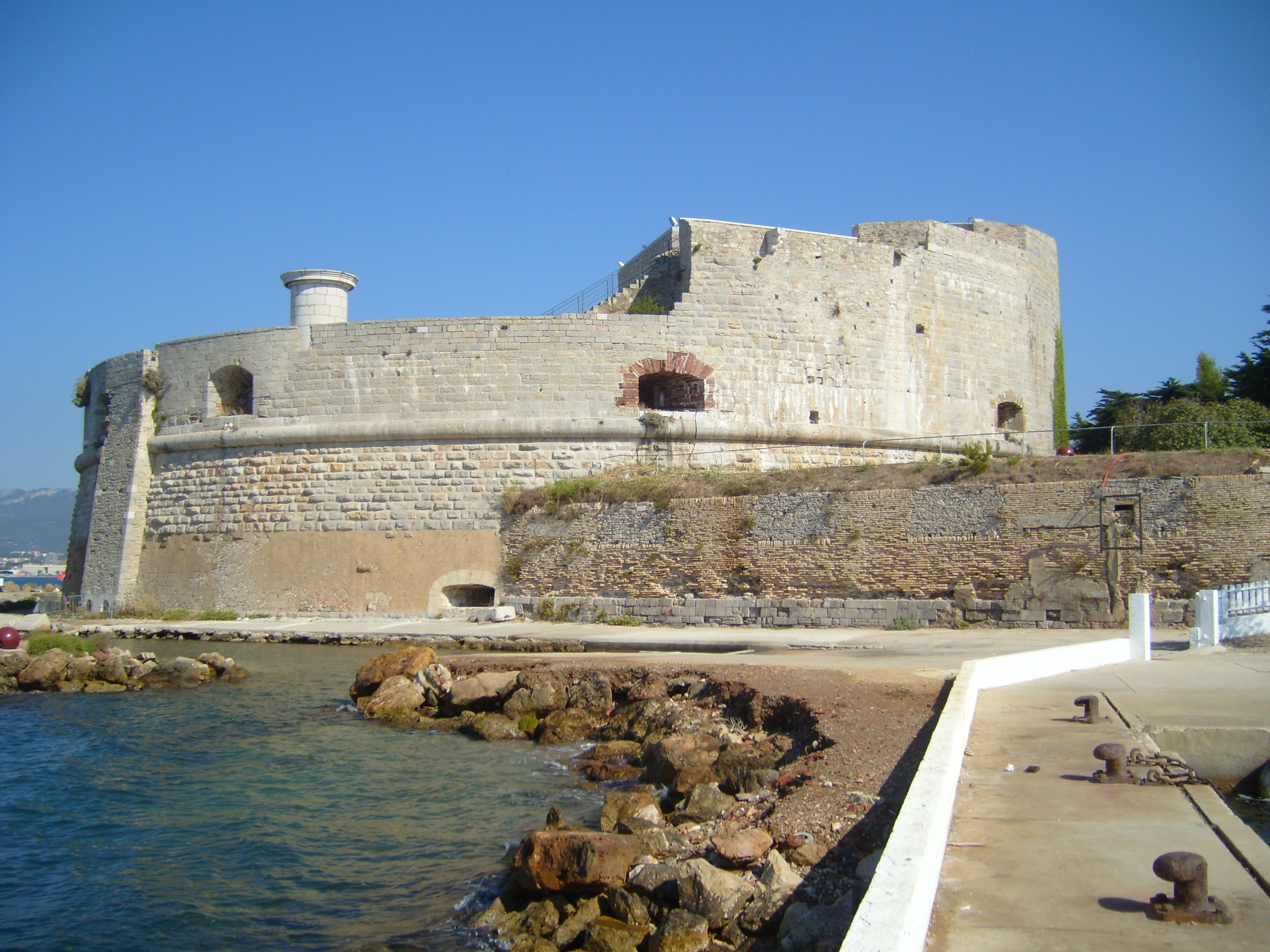
Tour Royale, Toulon (16th century)

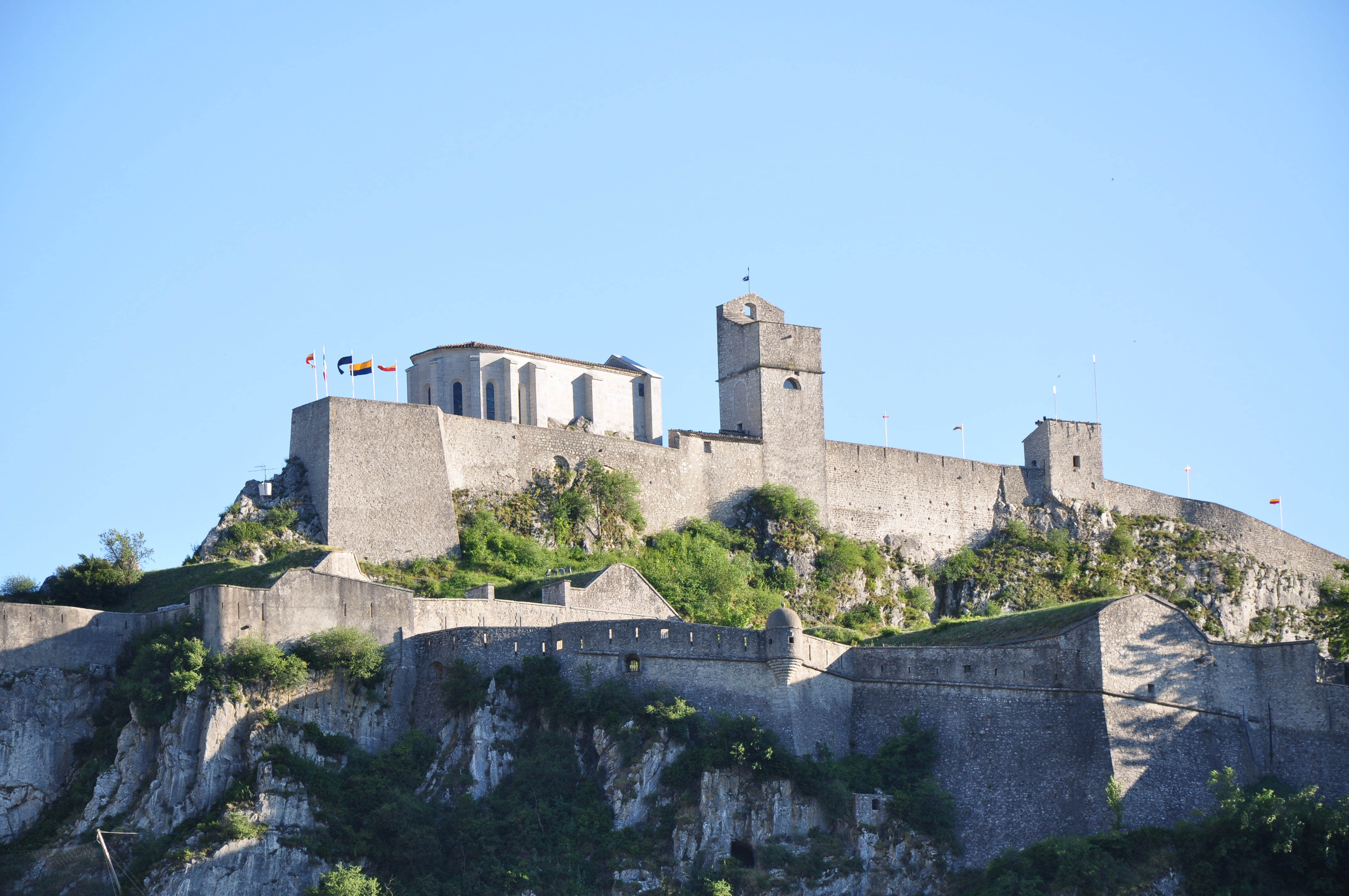
The Citadel of Sisteron (1590–97)

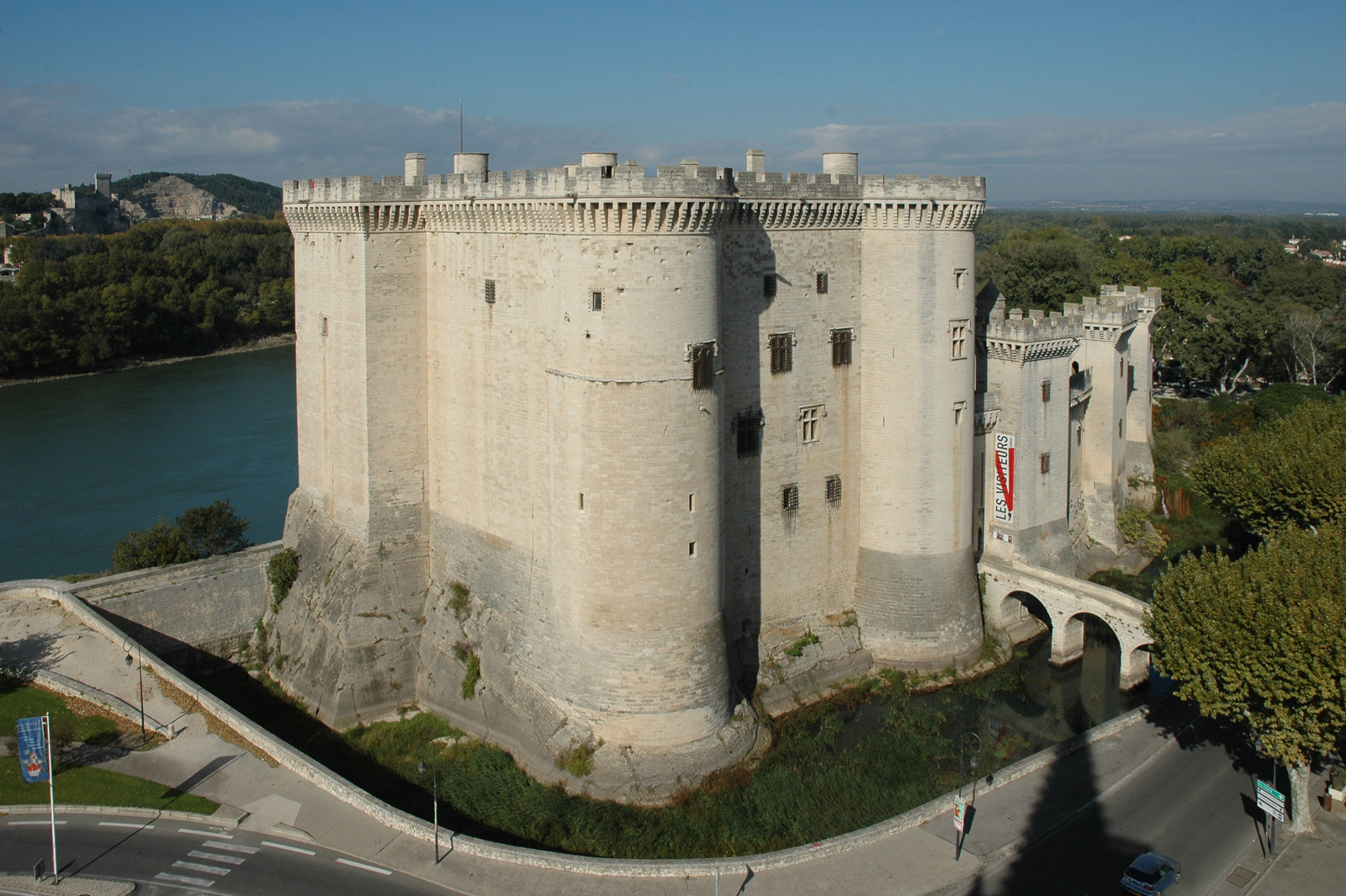
The Chateau of Tarascon (15th century)

== The Age of Louis XIV in Provence (17th century) ==
The age of Louis XIV in Provence was marked by an increase in prosperity, after the destructive Wars of Religion in the previous century. The citizens of Arles built a new Hôtel de ville (town hall), designed by the Arles architect Jacques Peytret aided by Jules Hardouin-Mansart, which had a large central court with a perfectly smooth vaulted ceiling, without a central column, supported entirely by the carefully joined stones resting on fine Doric columns. The Hôtel de ville symbolized the rise of the power of the bourgeoisie and showed that civil architecture could be as beautiful and powerful as religious architecture or royal palaces.

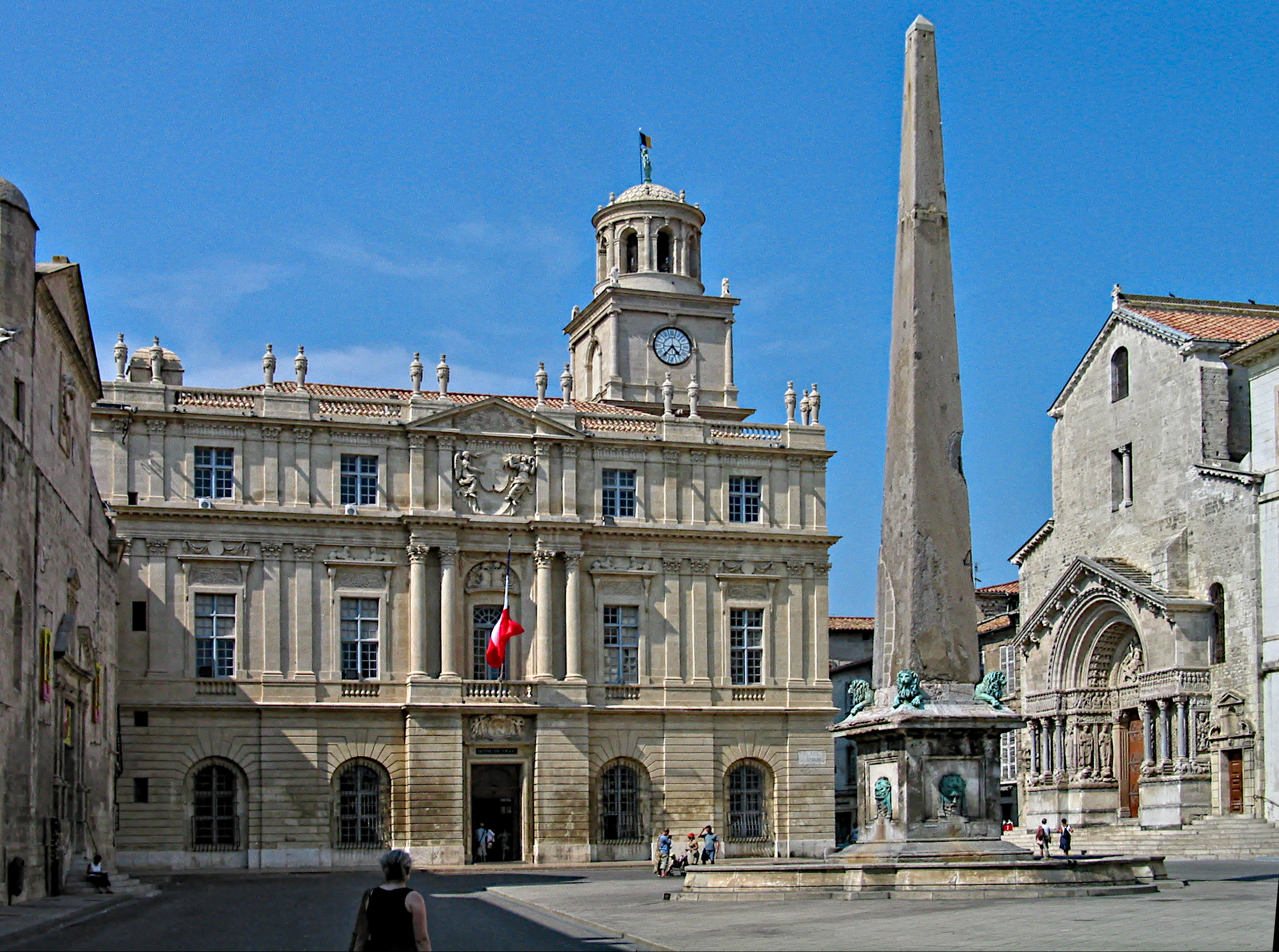
The Hôtel de ville and Place Republique in Arles (1675)

== Second Empire style (19th century) ==
The Toulon Opera, built in the flamboyant style of the French Second Empire, was begun at the same time as the Paris Opéra of Charles Garnier, and illustrated the importance of Toulon as the main base of the French Navy. The architect was Léon Feuchère. Construction was begun in 1860, and it opened in 1862. It boasted exceptional acoustics and seats for 1800 spectators, making it, after Paris, the second-largest opera house in France.

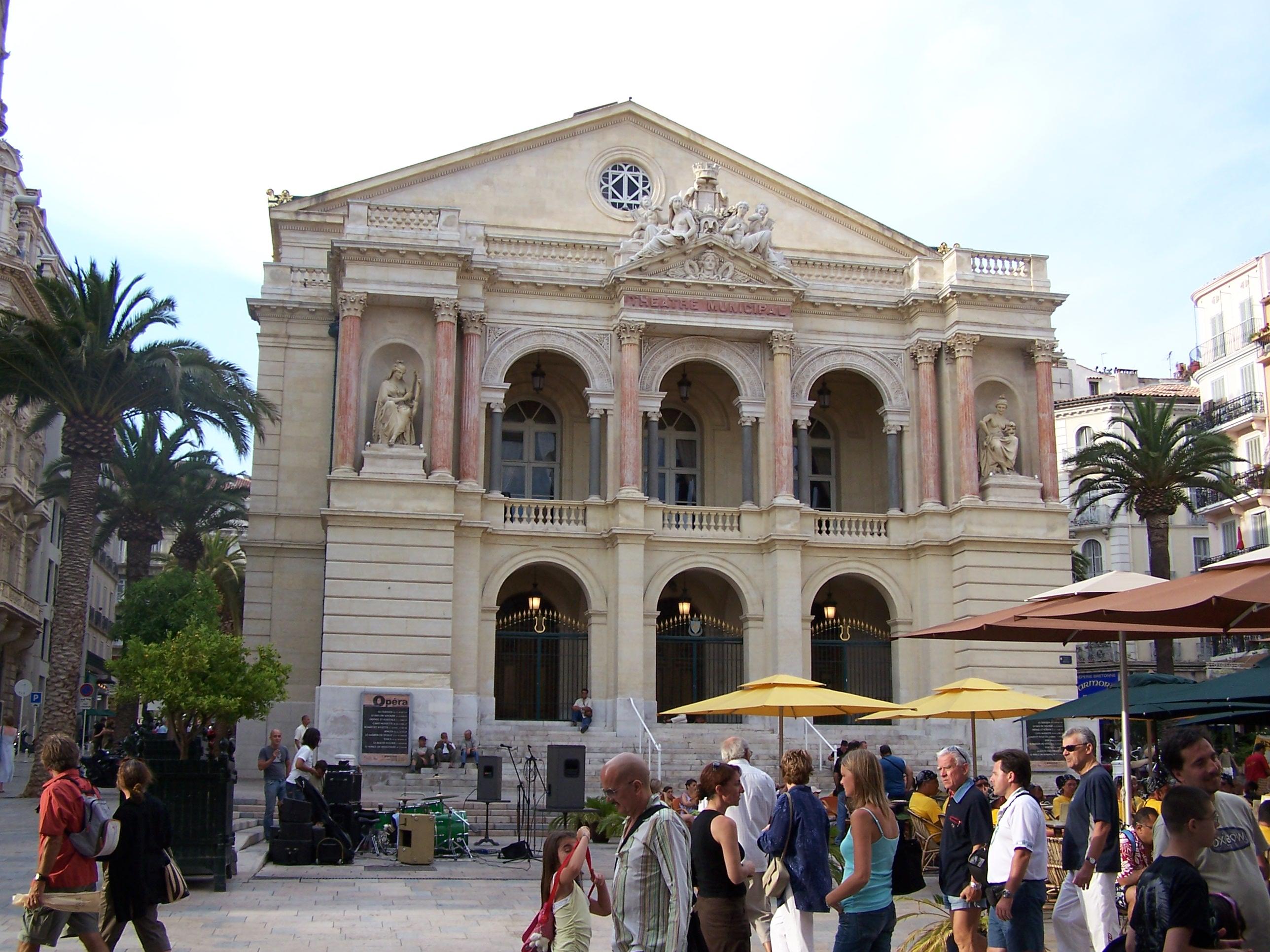
The Opera House of Toulon (1862)

== The Neo-Byzantine style (19th century) ==
The Basilica of Notre-Dame de la Garde in Marseille was built between 1853 and 1864 on the highest point in the city in the neo-Byzantine style. It was finished ten years before its famous sister, the Basilica of Sacré-Coeur in Paris, was begun. It was designed by the architect Henri-Jacques Espérandieu. The main feature of the church is a 197-foot (60 m) belfry with a statue of the Virgin and Child, visible miles out to sea.

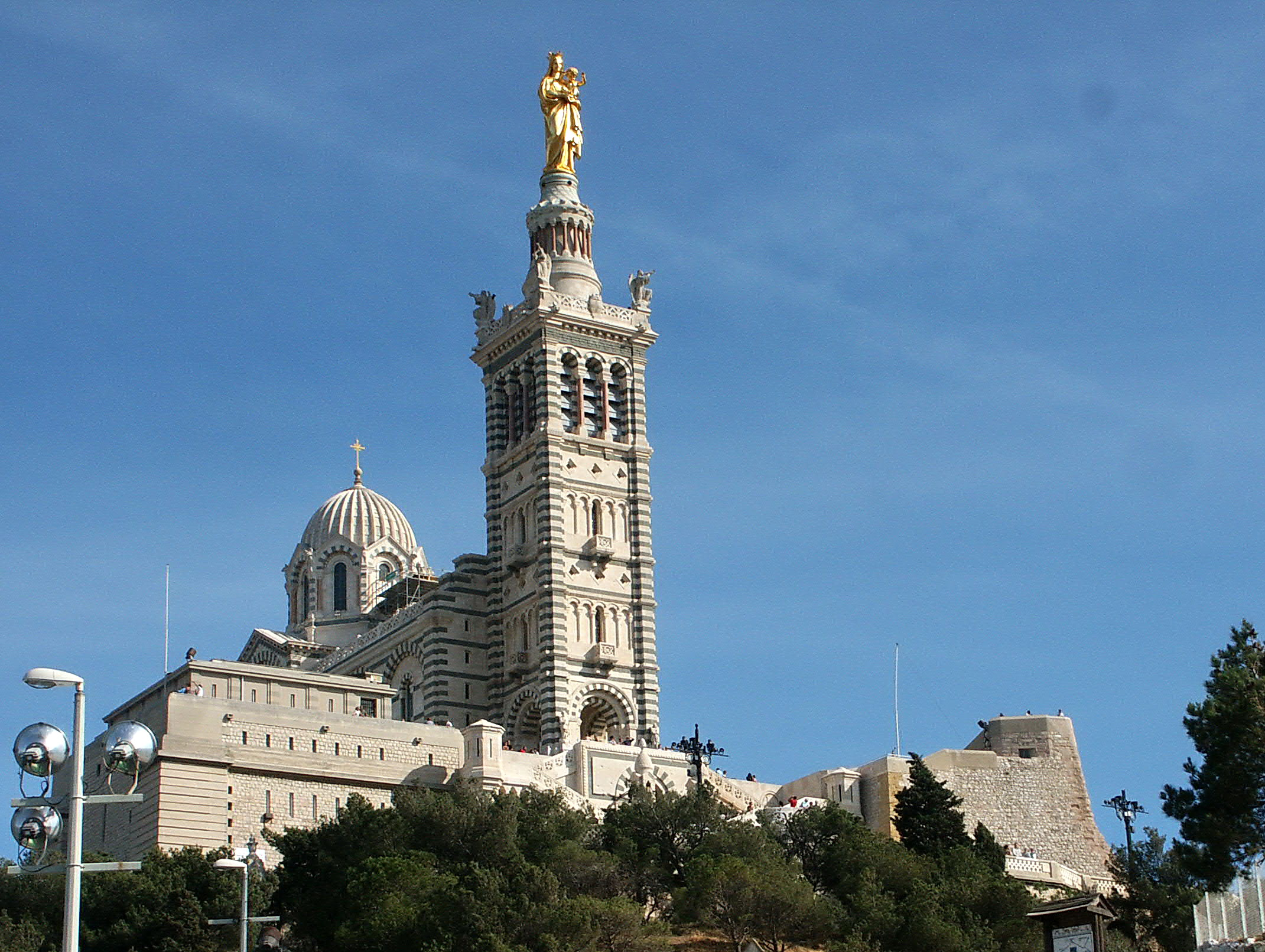
The Basilica of Notre-Dame de la Garde in Marseille (1853–1864)

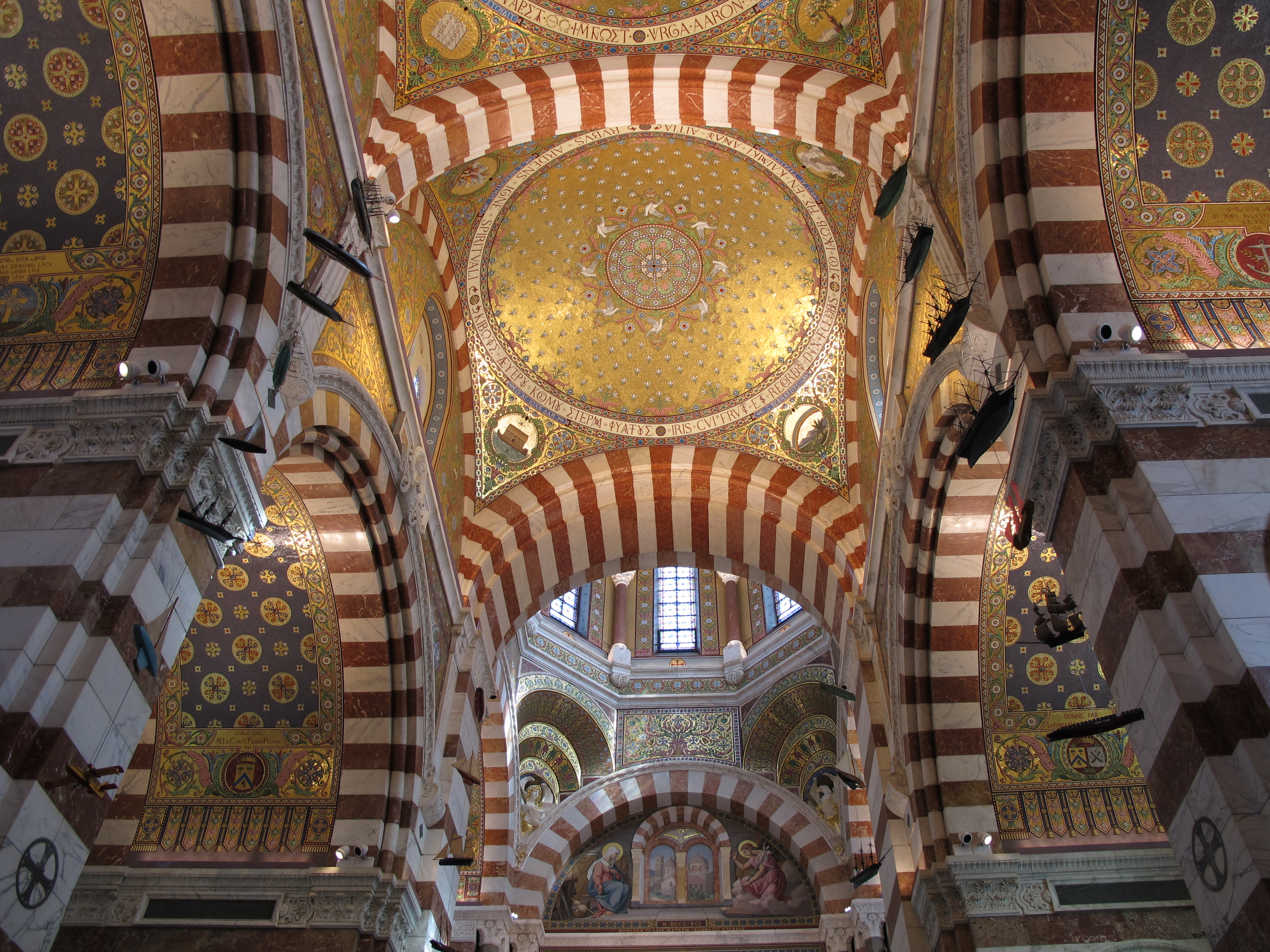
Interior of Notre-Dame de la Garde

== Rural architecture in Provence ==
The rural architecture of Provence features two distinctive types of farmhouses, the mas and the bastide.

A mas a largely self-sufficient economic unit, which could produce fruits, vegetables, meat, milk, and even silk. The house was usually built of local stone with a sloping Roman tile roof, and was a long rectangle, two or three stories high, with the kitchen and space for animals on the ground floor, and bedrooms, storage space for food, and often a room for raising silkworms on the first floor. As the family grew larger, the mas would be extended to make new rooms. The mas nearly always faced the south, to provide protection from the Mistral and it had few and very small windows, to keep out the summer heat and to keep in the heat in winter.

A bastide was the house of a wealthier farmer, and usually was in the shape of a square, with an interior courtyard. In the 19th and 20th centuries many bastides were occupied by wealthy city residents from Marseille.

== Corbusier in Provence (20th century) ==
The Unité d'habitation in Marseille, also known as the Cité radieuse de Marseille, designed by the architect Corbusier in 1946-1952, became one of the most influential buildings of the 20th century. Built of unfinished concrete (steel was not available because of the war), it had nineteen stories with 330 apartments of twenty different designs, along with shops, a restaurant, a hotel, clinic, sports facilities, a roof terrace, an outdoor auditorium, and a kindergarten. It was meant to be "a machine for living," with everything needed under a single roof. Corbusier built five versions of the Unité d'habitation, and it inspired similar buildings in other parts of France, Germany and in Britain; it became a model for new apartment buildings and public housing projects in the 1950s. It was praised and much criticized as the first example of Brutalist architecture.

Other buildings by Corbusier in Provence:

- Cabanon de vacances, 1952. Corbusier stayed several times in the Villa E 1027 in Roquebrune-Cap-Martin, and was commissioned in 1952 by Thomas Rebutato, the owner of a local restaurant, to build a beachside cabin, or cabanon. It was limited to 16 square meters, was made of wooden logs and plywood, and was to be furnished with only a couch, a table, and a sink. It was part of Corbusier's effort to standardize every genre of architecture. Later he added a tiny office next to the cabin.

== Modern architecture in Provence (20th century) ==
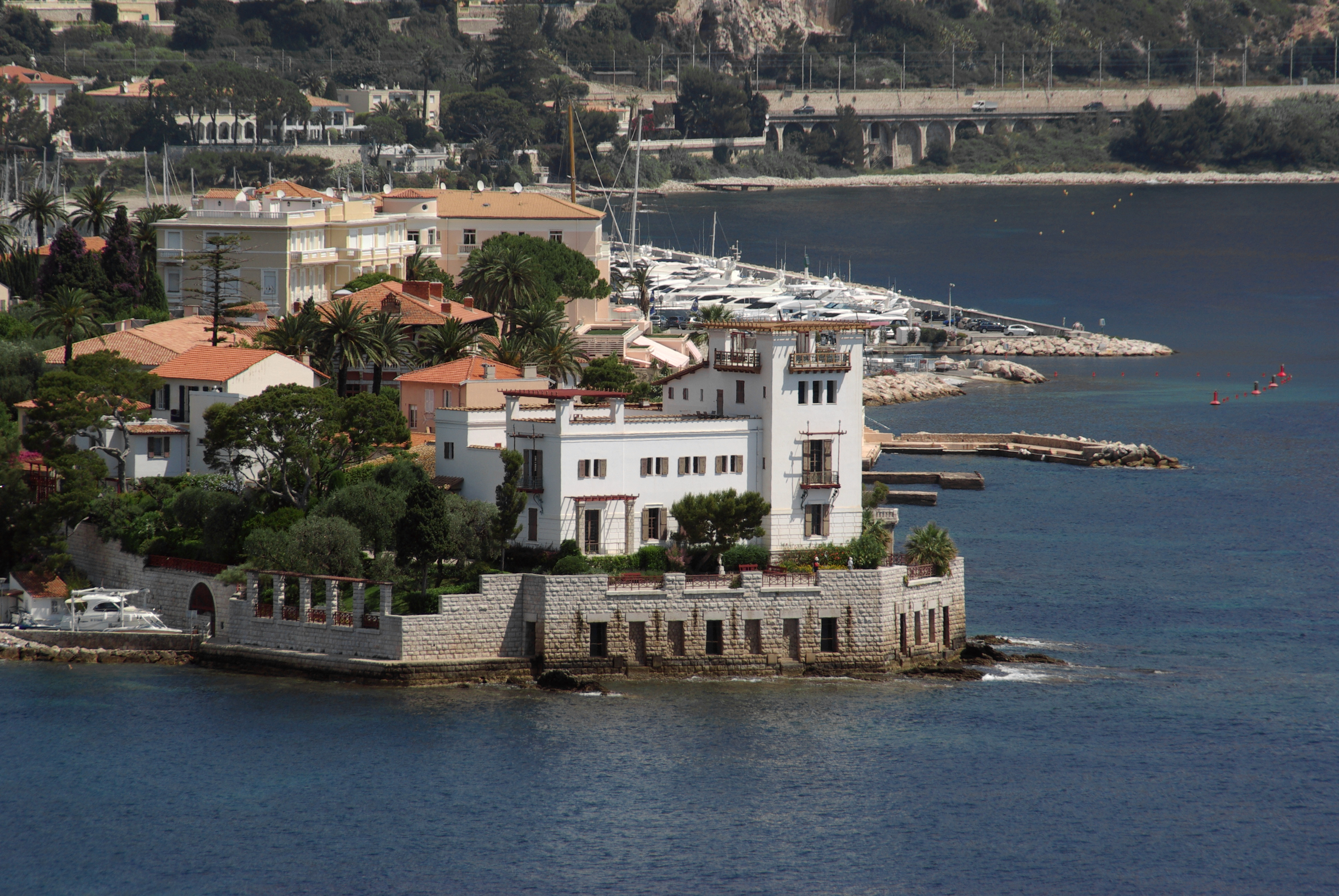
The Villa Kérylos, a modern version of an ancient Greek villa, near Beaulieu-sur-Mer (1903-1908).

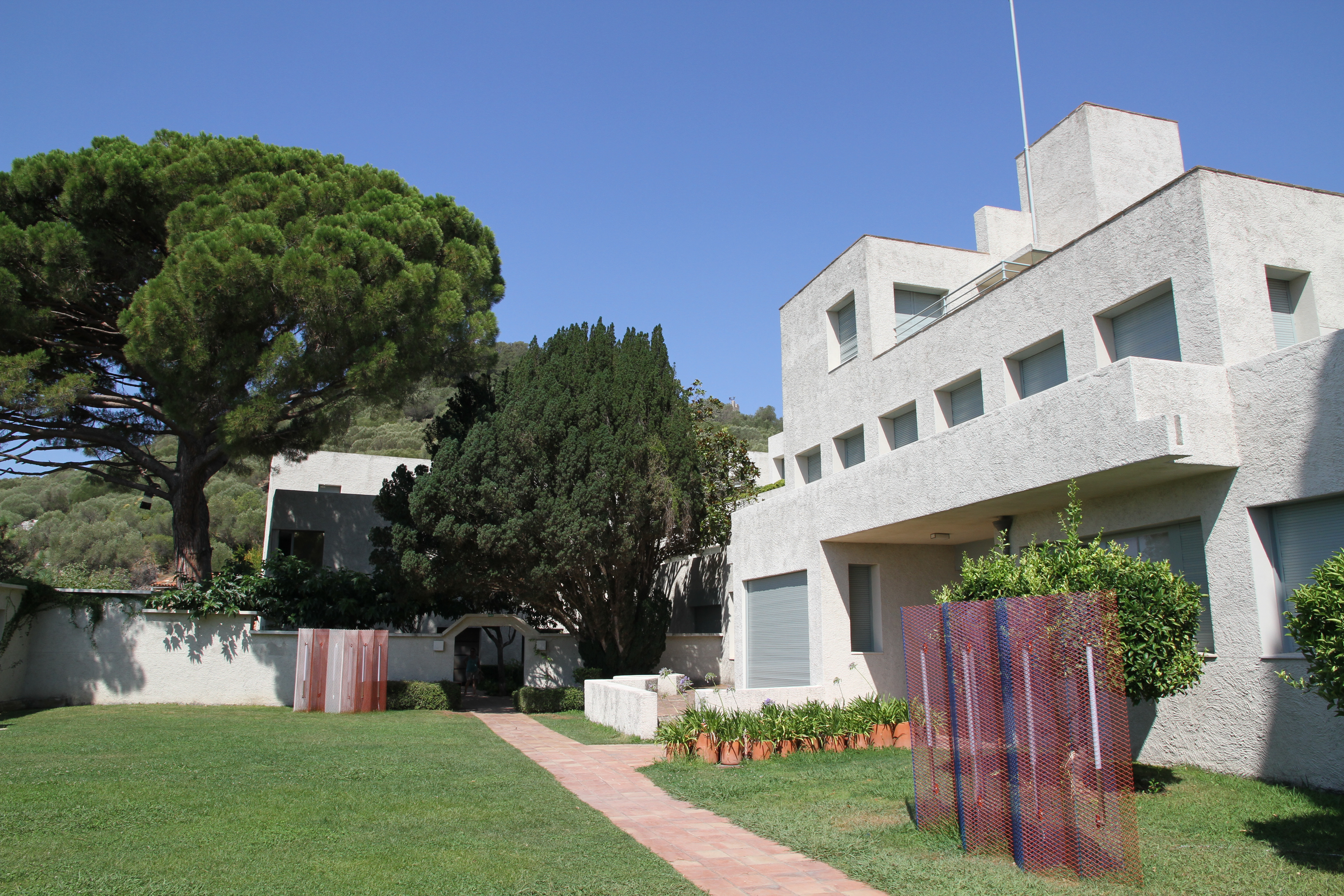
Villa de Noailles, Hyères (1923)

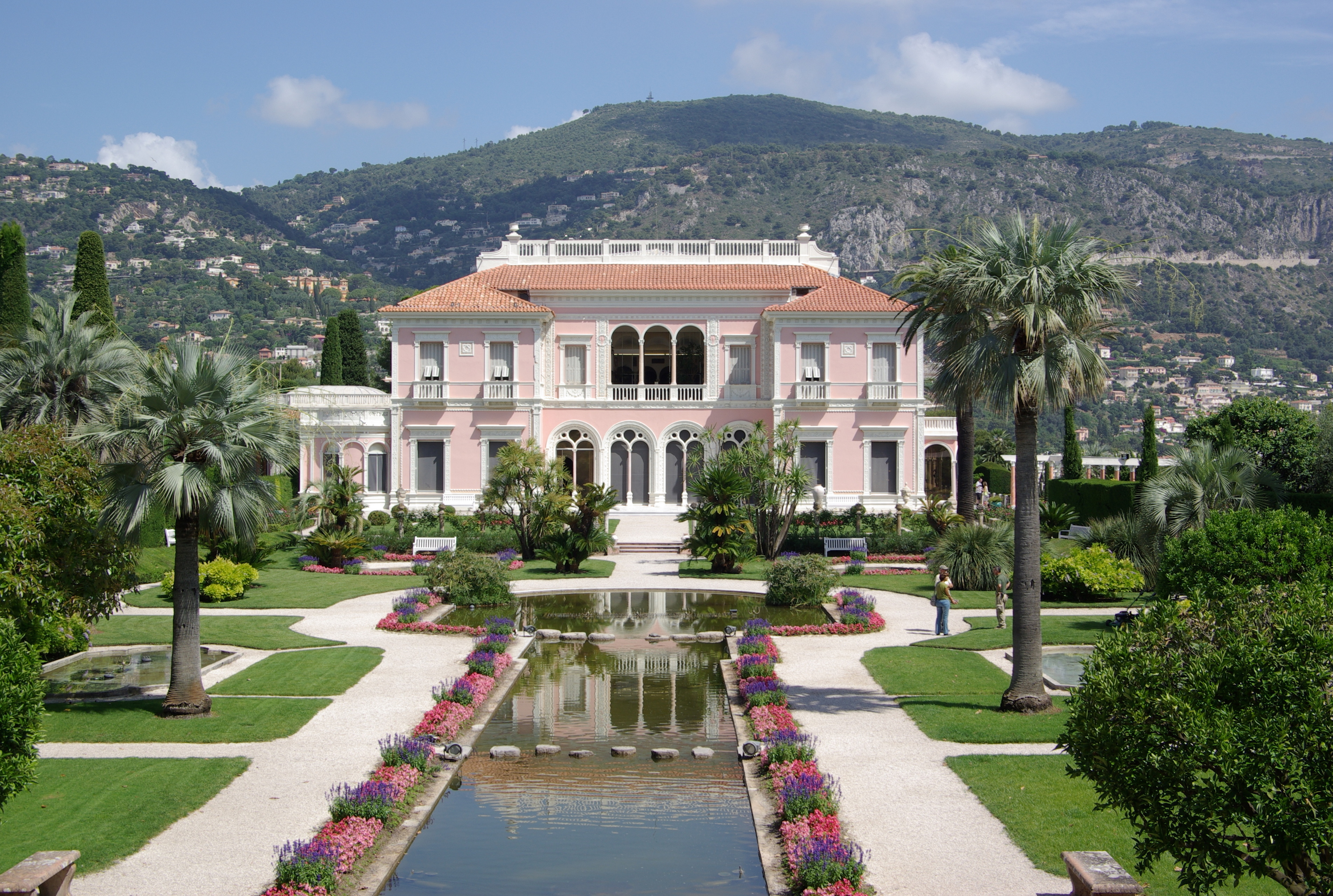
Villa Ephrussi de Rothschild and gardens. St. Jean Cap Ferrat (1911-1912).

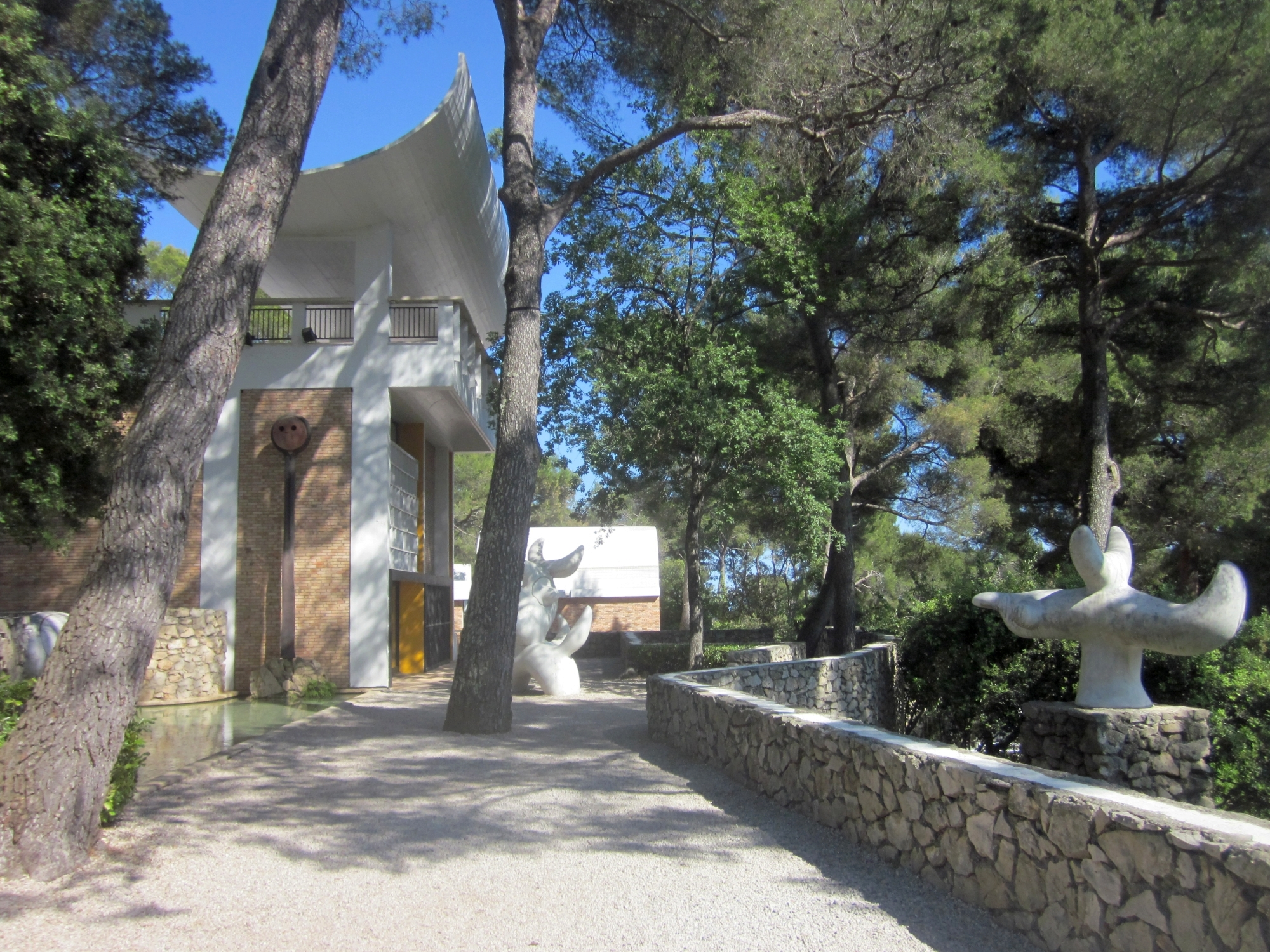
Fondation Maeght, Saint-Paul-de-Vence, (1960–1964)

Notable 20th-century buildings in Provence include:

- The Archives nationales d'outre-mer, Aix-en-Provence (1996), architects Thierry Lacoste, Antoinette Robain
- Villa André-Bloc, Antibes (1961), architect André Bloc, Claude Parent
- Musée de l'Arles antique, Arles (1995), architect Henri Ciriani
- Rotonde des locomotives, Avignon (1946), architects Paul Peirani, Bernard Lafaille
- Église Saint-Joseph-Travailleur d'Avignon, Avignon (1967–69), architects Guillaume Gillet, Charles André
- La Citadelle, Bagnols-sur-Ceze (1956–1961), architects Georges Candilis, Alexis Josic, Sadrach Woods, Guy Brunache, Paul Dony
- Villa Kerylos, Beaulieu-sur-Mer (1903–1908), architect Emmanuel Pontremoli
- InterContinental Carlton Cannes Hotel, Cannes (1909–1913), architect Charles Dalmas, Marcellin Mayère
- Villa Vent d'Aval, Grimaud, Var (1928–1950), architect Pierre Chareau
- Palais de la Méditerranée, Nice (1929), architects Charles Dalmas, Marcel Dalmas
- Centre de recherche IBM, La Gaude (1960–1962), architect Marcel Breuer
- Villa Seynave, Grimaud, Var (1961), architect Jean Prouvé
- Port Grimaud, Grimaud, Var (1963–1972, François Spoerry
- Villa Noailles, Hyères (1923), architect Robert Mallet-Stevens
- La Tourette, Marseille (1948–1953), architects Fernand Pouillon, Renė Egger
- Immeuble-facade du Vieux-Port, Marseille (1949–1954), architects Fernand Pouillon, Andre Devin, Andre LeConte, Auguste Perret
- Le Brasilia, Marseille (1957–1967), architect Fernand Boukobza
- École Nationale de Danse, Marseille (1992), architect Roland Simounet
- Hôtel du département des Bouches-du-Rhône, Marseille (1993), architects William Alsop, John Lyall
- Théâtre des Salins, Martigues (1995), architects Vincent Speller, Xavier Fabre, Marino Narpozzi
- Hotel Negresco, Nice (1911–1913), architect Édouard-Jean Niermans
- Sainte Jeanne d'Arc Church, Nice (1922–1933), architect Jacques Droz
- Musée des arts asiatiques, Nice ((1998), architect Kenzo Tange
- Espace Clodius, Orange (1997), architects Michel Seban, Elisabeth Douillet
- Villa Ephrussi de Rothschild, also known as the Villa Île-de-France, Saint-Jean-cap-Ferrat (1911–1912), architect Aaron Messiah
- Fondation Maeght, Saint-Paul-de-Vence (1960–1964), architect José Luis Sert
- Villa E 1027, Roquebrune-Cap-Martin (1926–1929), architects Eileen Gray, Jean Badovici
- Latitude 41, Saint-Tropez (1932–33), architect Georges-Henri Pingusson
- Villa Dollander, Saint-Clair, (1949–1951, architects Henri Prouvé, Jean Prouvé
- The Stadium of Vitrolles (1994), architect Rudy Ricciotti
- Eglise-mairie, Valbonne (1988–1989), architects Pierre Faroux, Bruno Keller
- Port-la-Galère, Théoule-sur-Mer (1968–1979), architects Jacques Couelle, Léopold Vitorge

== The 21st century ==
The Gare d'Avignon TGV is a new passenger train station, built on the LGV Méditerranée high-speed train line in South-eastern France, inaugurated in 2001. It was designed by the cabinet of architecture of the SNCF under the direction of Jean-Marie Duthilleul and Jean-François Blassel. Its Gothic arches echo the most famous landmark in Avignon, the Palais des Papes.

== Bibliography ==
- Denizeau, Gerard, Histoire Visuelle des Monuments de France, Larousse, 2003.
- LeMoine, Bertrand, Guide d'architecture, France, 20e siècle, Picard, Paris 2000.
