= Max Gottlieb =

American film director (born 1969)

Max Gottlieb (born 1969) is an American film and Broadway theatre producer, live comedy producer, production designer, screenwriter, and film director. He is best known for his work on the 1997 film The Full Monty. Gottlieb was a producer on the Tony nominated Rock of Ages which ran on Broadway from 2009 - 2015 and in Las Vegas from 2012 - 2017.. The show was turned into a film by Warner Brothers starring Tom Cruise. He has also written about Jewish issues.

== Selected filmography ==
- The Other Me (2022)
- Laid in America (2016)
- Blitz (2011)
- Beware the Gonzo (2010)
- Mr. Nice (2010)
- Inconceivable (2008)
- Intervention (2007)
- Magicians (2007)
- Rag Tale (2005)
- Octane (2003)
- Lucky Break (2001)
- Best (2000)
- Still Crazy (1998)
- The Very Thought of You (1998)
- Raising the Heights (1998)
- Shooting Fish (1997)
- The Full Monty ( 1997)
- I.D. ( 1995)
- Shopping ( 1994)
- The Turn of the Screw (1992)
- Hardware (1990)
- Unmasked Part 25 (1988)
