= Sara Stockbridge =

English model, actress and author

- Born: Sarah Jane Stockbridge; 14 November 1965 (age 60); Woking, Surrey, England
- Occupations: Actress; model; author
- Children: Max; Lelu

Sara Stockbridge (born Sarah Jane Stockbridge; 14 November 1965) is an English model, actress and author. In the second half of the 1980s, she was the muse of fashion designer Vivenne Westwood.

== Early life ==
Stockbridge was born in Woking, Surrey, England. Her father was a civil engineer. Sara and her brother spent their early childhood with their family living in Trinidad, Bahrain and Peru. They returned to Woking in the late 1970s.

== Career ==
=== Modelling ===
Stockbridge moved to London at age 18 and was taken on by Models 1. A couple of years later, she modelled for Vivienne Westwood. The first fashion show she worked at as model was Mini Crini, Spring/Summer 1985. After her first fashion show, Westwood asked her to front a music project called Choice. She appeared on the cover of i-D and Blitz magazines.

Sara modelled as Tank Girl for a series of promotional photos by photographer Paul Spencer. Her aim was to be cast as Tank Girl in the movie of the same name. Although she did not get the part, the photos became well known and were seen on the covers of magazines such as Elle, Vogue and The Face. She appeared as a shorn headed dominatrix in the British comedy film U.F.O.. In the film, Oh Marbella!, she played a part as the wife of a rich businessman at a nude resort in Spain. Stockbridge is still active in the modelling and acting world. She recently returned for appearances on Westwood's catwalk and in British Vogue.

=== Writing ===
Her first novel, Hammer, was published in 2009 and her second novel, Cross My Palm, in 2011.

== Personal life ==
She has a son and daughter, Lelu. At 45 she married Cobalt Stargazer, lead guitarist with Zodiac Mindwarp and the Love Reaction. Together they formed a new band, Rooster, with Godwin Nwafor of Alabama 3.

== Filmography ==
=== Film ===
- Split Second (1992) – Tiffany
- Carry On Columbus (1992) – Nina the Model
- U.F.O. (1993) – Zoe
- Interview with the Vampire (1994) – Estelle
- Go Now (1995) – Bridget
- The Imitators (1996) – The Dream Space Baby
- 24 Hours in London (2000) – Simone
- Best (2000) – Night Huntress
- The Wedding Tackle (2000) – Felicity
- Bridget Jones's Diary (2001) – Melinda
- Spider (2002) – Gladys
- Oh Marbella! (2003) – Maggie
- Rag Tale (2005) – Sally May
- Intervention (2007) – Sarah
- Inconceivable (2008) – Trixie 'Trix' Bell
- Enter the Void (2009) – Suzy
- The Making of Plus One (2010) – Rusty Robinson

=== Television ===
- Red Dwarf (1992, Episode: "Terrorform") – Handmaiden
- Comic Strip Presents (1992–1993) – Helen / Shaaron / Sonia / Janet
- Glam Metal Detectives (1995) – Sara / Maisie
- The Bill (1995–2002) – Gail Stuart / Liz Terry / Carol Tate / Fran
- EastEnders (1996) – Louise
- David (1997, biblical telefilm) – Witch of Endor
- Lucy Sullivan Is Getting Married (1999–2000) – Megan
- Grange Hill (2002) – Suzie Gilks
- Tipping the Velvet (2002, BBC Film) – Dickie

== Music ==
- Adam Ant's Music Video – "Room at the Top"
- Glam Metal Detectives' single "Everybody Up!"
- Blur's promotional video "Country House"
- Betty Boo's promotional video "Hangover"
- Duran Duran's promotional video "Electric Barbarella" – 1997
- Gun's promotional video "Taking on the World"
