= The Price of Desire =

- Film poster
- Directed by: Mary McGuckian
- Written by: Mary McGuckian
- Starring: Orla Brady; Vincent Perez; Francesco Scianna; Alanis Morissette
- Cinematography: Stefan von Bjorn
- Edited by: Mary McGuckian; John O'Connor; Robert O'Connor; Kant Pan
- Music by: Brian Byrne
- Release dates: 19 March 2015 (Dublin International Film Festival); 27 May 2016 (UK and Ireland)
- Running time: 108 minutes
- Countries: Belgium; Ireland
- Language: English

The Price of Desire is a 2015 Belgian-Irish biographical drama film directed by Mary McGuckian.

== Premise ==
The film revolves around Eileen Gray's E-1027 villa, one of the first homes Gray designed and also one of the first homes of the modern architecture movement, and Gray's relationship with fellow architect Le Corbusier, who erased Gray's recognition as the author of her work and as one of the most forceful and influential inspirations of modern architecture and design.

== Cast ==
- Orla Brady as Eileen Gray
- Vincent Perez as Le Corbusier
- Francesco Scianna as Jean Badovici
- Alanis Morissette as Marisa Damia
- Dominique Pinon as Fernand Léger
- Tamara Vučković as Louise Dany
- Elsa Zylberstein as Romaine Brooks
- Anne Lambton as Marie Louise Schelbert
- David Herlihy as Aristotle Onassis
- Caitriona Balfe as Gabrielle Bloch
- Adriana Randall as Charlotte Perriand
- Natasha Girardi as Natalie Barney
- Marcos Adamantiadis as Gustave Miklos
- Hayet Belhalloufi as Mireille Roupest
- Ronald Beurms as Jean Paul Rayon
- Arnaud Bronsart as Marcel Proust
- Pascaline Crêvecoeur as Berenice Abbott
- Sammy Leslie as Gertrude Stein
- Cherise Silvestri as Evelyn Wild
- Tan Win as Seizo Sugawara
- François Zachary as Archipenko
- Edwin Gillet as Guillaume Apollinaire

== Production ==
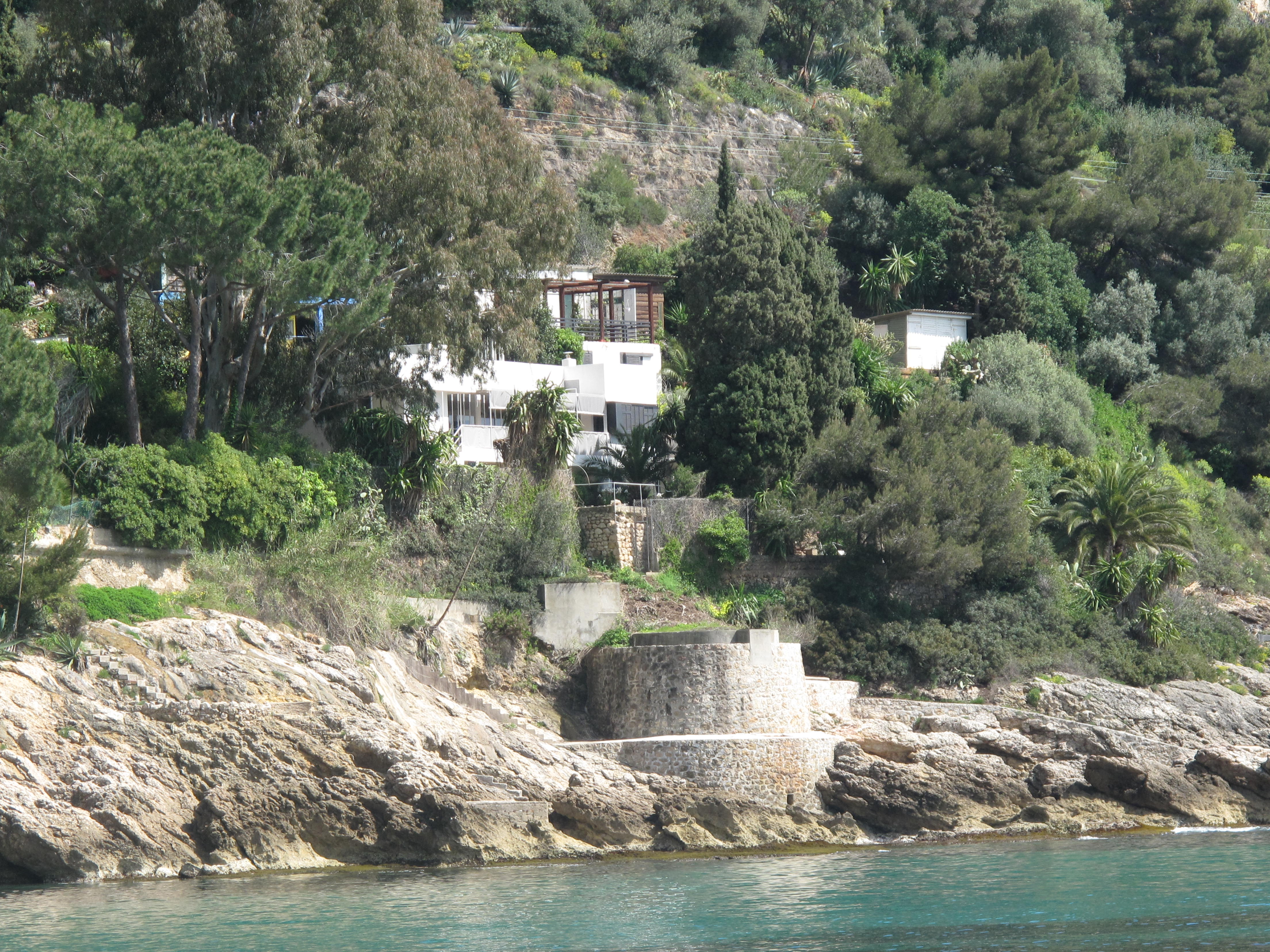
E-1027, Eileen Gray's villa, was restored for use in the film

In an interview in 2011 for her film Man on the Train, director Mary McGuckian explained that her future project would be the development of the feature film The Price of Desire after finishing working on The Novelist.

The film went into pre-production in 2013, and the film's budget required a loan of €300,000. American actress Shannyn Sossamon was initially cast as Gray, before Orla Brady took over the role.

Part of the film takes place in the authentic French villa of Eileen Gray which she herself designed, E-1027, located in Roquebrune-Cap-Martin. With the villa in disrepair, the producers launched a Kickstarter campaign to help restore the house with Parisian interiors. Art director Anne Seibel, who won the Academy Award for Best Production Design for her work on Midnight in Paris, worked with Emmanuelle Pucci to recreate the aesthetics of the house.

At the beginning of August 2013, filming was done in a studio in Brussels, Belgium.

Filming took place at the end of August on the French Riviera in Roquebrune-Cap-Martin in villa E-1027 as well as around the Roquebrune-Cap-Martin train station.

Postproduction services were provided by Windmill Lane Studios.

== Distribution ==
Entertainment One obtained the rights for distribution the film across Canada and France.

== Release ==
The film premiered at the Dublin International Film Festival in March 2015.

== Reception ==
The film holds a 25% approval rating on review aggregator website Rotten Tomatoes, based on 12 reviews.
