= Donna D'Errico =

American actress and model

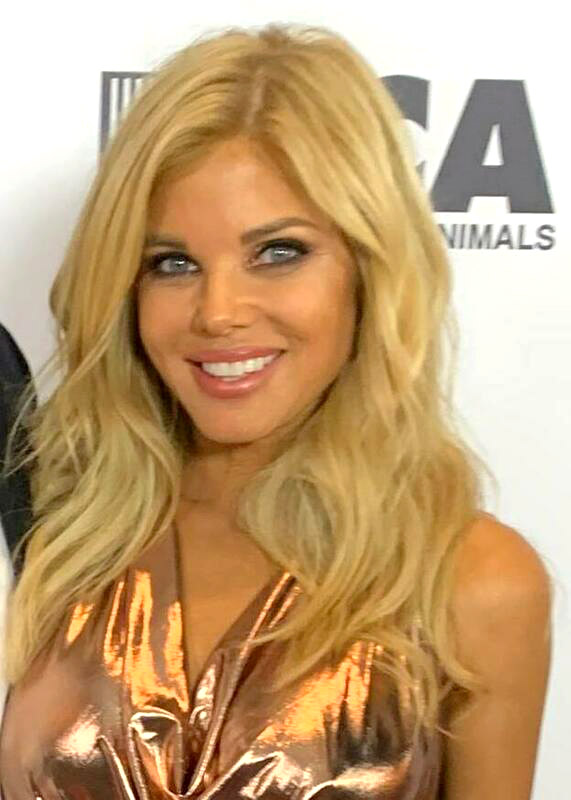
- D'Errico in Beverly Hills, 2019
- Born: Donna Jeanette D'Errico; March 30, 1968 (age 58); Dothan, Alabama, U.S.
- Occupations: Actress, model
- Years active: 1995–present
- Spouse: Nikki Sixx (m. 1996; div. 2007)
- Children: 2

Playboy centerfold appearance
- September 1995

Donna Jeanette D'Errico (born March 30, 1968) is an American actress. She posed for Playboy as its Playmate of the Month for September 1995 and had a regular role (1996–1998) on the television series Baywatch. She continues to act in films and on television.

== Career ==
Before appearing in Playboy, D'Errico had a Las Vegas–based limousine company. When Playboy chose her as its Playmate of the Month for September 1995, her centerfold was photographed by Richard Fegley.

She was chosen for the starring role of Donna Marco on the television series Baywatch, for two seasons, from 1996 to 1998. One episode dealt with her Playboy layout. She was also a host of the show Battlebots, and starred in the film Candyman: Day of the Dead. For a time, she owned Zen Spa, a day spa in Calabasas, California. After Baywatch, she appeared in independent films, including Intervention, Inconceivable, and The Making of Plus One alongside Andie MacDowell, Jennifer Tilly, Colm Feore and Elizabeth McGovern.

== Personal life ==
Donna D'Errico divorced rock musician Nikki Sixx in 2007, after 11 years of marriage. They had separated shortly after their daughter's birth, then reconciled months later when Sixx completed rehab. She later filed for divorce on April 27, 2006, citing irreconcilable differences. Together they had one daughter born in 2001. D'Errico also has a son, film composer Rhyan D'Errico (born 1993). She supports animal rights and is a vegan. She is a Roman Catholic who attends Mass weekly and prays the Rosary every night with her children.

In 2011, D'Errico said she was in training to fulfill a long-held dream of climbing Mount Ararat in Turkey to search for frozen remains of the Biblical Noah's ark. After climbing the mountain in mid-2012, she returned to the U.S. in August after suffering injuries from a fall near the end of the climb.

== Filmography ==
=== Film ===
Year	Title	Role	Notes
1998	Baywatch: White Thunder at Glacier Bay	Donna Marco	Video
1998	Men in White	Press Secretary	TV movie
1999	Candyman: Day of the Dead	Caroline McKeever	Video
2002	Austin Powers in Goldmember	Female Vendor	
2002	Kiss the Bride	Officer Daisy	
2004	Comic Book: The Movie	Liberty Lass/Papaya Smith	Video
2007	Intervention	Pamela	
2008	Inconceivable	Elsa Roxanne Gold	
2010	The Making of Plus One	Frances Money	
2015	Only God Can	Coley	
2018	Nanny Surveillance	Sarah	TV movie
2021	Escape From Area 51	Sheera	
2021	Survive the Game	Carly	
2022	Frank and Penelope	Mabel	

=== Television ===
Year	Title	Role	Notes
1995	Unhappily Ever After	Fantasy Girl #1	Episode: "A Line in the Sand"
1995	Married... with Children	Helga	Episode: "The Two That Got Away"
1996	High Tide	Blonde Waitress	Episode: "Code Name: Scorpion"
1996–97	Baywatch Nights	Donna Marco	Recurring Cast: Season 1, Main Cast: Season 2
1996–98	Baywatch	Donna Marco	Main Cast: Season 7-8
1997	Jeopardy!	Herself/Celebrity Contestant	Episode: "1997 Celebrity Jeopardy! Game 5"
1997	The Big Easy	Eve Davenport	Episode: "Heavenly Body"
1997	Sabrina, the Teenage Witch	Nurse Nancy/Carol	Guest Cast: Season 1-2
1998	Nick Freno: Licensed Teacher	Samantha	Recurring Cast: Season 2
1998	Holding the Baby	Heather	Episode: "Looking For Mr. Hoppity"
2000	BattleBots	Herself/Host	Main Host: Season 1
2001	MTV Spring Break	Herself/Co-Host	Main Co-Host
2001	The Test	Herself/Panelist	Episode: "The Good Samaritan Test"
2001	Rendez-View	Herself	Episode: "Beware of Roamin' Hands"
2003	Hollywood Squares	Herself/Panelist	Recurring Panelist
2003	Modern Marvels	Herself	Episode: "Harley-Davidson"
2004	Players	Herself	Episode: "Impin' with a Pippin!"
2004	Reno 911!	New Johnson - Deputy Barbara Cooper	Episode: "Department Investigation: Part 2"
2006	VH1: All Access	Herself	Episode: "Celeb Breakups & Scandals"
2006	Celebrity Paranormal Project	Herself	Episode: "In Sanatorium"
2007	Whatever Happened To?	Herself	Episode: "Beach Babes"
2010	Celebrity Ghost Stories	Herself	Episode: "Episode #2.1"
2016	Roadies	Roberta aka Red Velvet	Episode: "The City Whose Name Must Not Be Spoken"
2017	Million Dollar Matchmaker	Herself	Episode: "Mr. Hit It and Quit It and the Baywatch Babe"
2018	9-1-1	Stephanie	Episode: "Dosed"
2019	Brooklyn Nine-Nine	Marissa Costa	Episode: "Hitchcock & Scully"
2020	Paparazzi X-Posed	Herself	Episode: "Episode #1.1" & "#1.4"
2020	Hell's Kitchen	Herself/Restaurant Patron	Episode: "Wedding Bells in Hell"
2020	Digital Sky	Aunt Paula	Episode: "Moonstone"

Melissa Holliday	Lisa Marie Scott	Stacy Sanches	Danelle Folta	Cynthia Gwyn Brown	Rhonda Adams
Heidi Mark	Rachel Jeán Marteen	Donna D'Errico	Alicia Rickter	Holly Witt	Samantha Torres
