= John Lynch (actor) =

Northern Irish actor (born 1961)

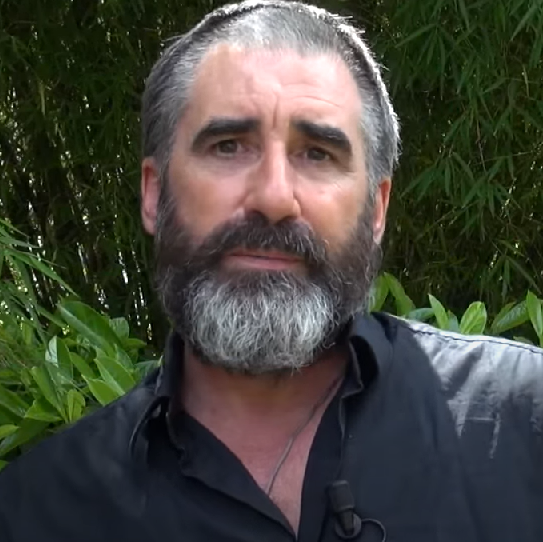
- Lynch in 2015
- Born: 26 December 1961 (age 64); England
- Education: Royal Central School of Speech and Drama
- Occupations: Actor, novelist
- Years active: 1984–present
- Spouse: Mary McGuckian (m. 1997)
- Relatives: Susan Lynch (sister); Leah O'Rourke (niece)

John Lynch (born 26 December 1961) is an actor and novelist from Northern Ireland. He won the AACTA Awards Award for Best Actor for his performance in Angel Baby (1995). His notable screen credits include Cal, The Secret Garden, In the Name of the Father, Sliding Doors, the television series The Fall, Medici, The Head, The Banishing, and Blue Lights. Lynch is also the author of the novels Torn Water and Falling Out of Heaven.

== Early life ==
Lynch was born in England to an Irish father, Fin Lynch, and an Italian mother, Rosina Pavone, better known as Rose. His mother was from Trivento, a town in the Province of Campobasso in Molise, Southern Italy. His parents met in London, where his mother was a teacher. He is the eldest of five siblings, all of whom were raised as Catholics.

In 1968, when he was seven years old, his family moved to the townland of Corrinshego, where his father was from, in County Armagh, Northern Ireland. Corrinshego, where he spent the rest of his childhood and teenage years, is on the western outskirts of Newry. Lynch later attended St. Colman's College in Newry. He began acting in Irish language plays at school during the early years of The Troubles in Northern Ireland. His sister Susan Lynch and his nephew Thomas Finnegan are also actors.

== Career ==
Lynch has appeared in numerous films related to Northern Ireland's history and the Troubles in particular. These include Cal (1984) with Helen Mirren, for which he was nominated for the BAFTA Award for Most Promising Newcomer to Leading Film Roles, The Railway Station Man (1992) with Julie Christie and Donald Sutherland, In the Name of the Father (1993) with Daniel Day-Lewis, Nothing Personal (1995) and Some Mother's Son (1996), also with Mirren, as well as the Irish-themed film Evelyn (2002). In Some Mother's Son, he played the role of Irish Republican hunger strike leader Bobby Sands.

He was a supporting actor in Derek Jarman's Edward II (1991), as Lord Craven in Agnieska Holland's film The Secret Garden (1993), as Tadhg in The Secret of Roan Inish (1994), and as Gerry in Sliding Doors (1998).

Lynch played the lead in the Australian feature Angel Baby, winning the Australian Film Institute award for best leading actor and the Australian Film Critics award for best actor of 1995. He was nominated for a Satellite Film Award for the film Moll Flanders in 1996. He worked with acclaimed Belgian director Marion Hänsel on her adaptation of Booker Prize-nominated author Damon Galgut's novel, The Quarry (also known as La Faille; 1998), which won Best Film at the Montreal World Film Festival. Lynch played the part of football legend George Best in the 2000 film Best. He won Best Actor for his role in Best at the Fort Lauderdale Film Festival in 2000. He wrote and co-produced the film.

In 2005, Lynch was nominated for an IFTA for his role in The Baby War. He starred in Five Day Shelter as Stephen, which won a European Film Award and was in competition at the Rome Film Festival. In 2011, he played the lead in Craig Vivieros' first feature film, the prison drama Ghosted. He played the role of Wollfstan in Black Death, and appeared in the 2012 film version of Michael Morpurgo's novel, Private Peaceful.

Lynch is also a novelist. His first novel, Torn Water, was published in November 2005 by 4th Estate, a literary imprint of HarperCollins. His second, Falling Out of Heaven, was released in May 2010 by the same publisher.

== Personal life ==
Lynch married film-maker Mary McGuckian in 1997, having met her on the set of Words Upon the Window Pane a few years earlier. They separated in 2008 and later divorced.

== Filmography ==
=== Film ===
Year	Title	Role	Notes
1984	Cal	Cal	
1990	Hardware	Shades	
1990	1871	O'Brien	
1991	Edward II	Spencer	
1992	The Railway Station Man	Damian Sweeney	
1993	The Secret Garden	Lord Craven	
1993	In the Name of the Father	Paul Hill	
1994	The Secret of Roan Inish	Tadhg Coneelly	
1994	Princess Caraboo	Amon McCarthy	
1994	Words Upon the Window Pane	John Corbet	
1995	Angel Baby	Harry	
1995	Nothing Personal	Liam	
1996	Some Mother's Son	Bobby Sands	
1996	Moll Flanders	Jonathan (the Artist)	Nominated Best Supporting Actor - Satellite Awards
1997	This Is the Sea	Padhar McAliskey	
1998	Sliding Doors	Gerry	
1998	The Quarry	The Man	
2000	Best	George Best	
2002	Puckoon	O'Brien	
2002	Re-Inventing Eddie	Eddie Harris	
2002	Evelyn	Senior Counsel Mr. Wolfe	
2003	Conspiracy of Silence	Father Matthew Francis	
2003	Alien Hunter	Dr. Michael Straub	
2004	The Bridge of San Luis Rey	Captain Alvarado	
2005	Isolation	Dan	
2005	Lassie	Sam Carraclough	
2008	In Transit	Yakov	
2009	Holy Water	Tom Gaffney	Later renamed Hard Times
2009	The Tournament	Gene Walker	
2010	Five Day Shelter	Stephen	
2010	Black Death	Wolfstan	
2010	Night Wolf	McRae	Also known as 13Hrs
2011	Ghosted	Jack	
2012	The Hot Potato	Bill	
2012	Private Peaceful	Sergeant Hanley	
2013	Möbius	Joshua	
2014	The Hybrid	Powell	
2016	Detour	Frank	
2016	Alleycats	Redman	
2016	Upstream	Sean	
2017	Pilgrimage	Brother Ciarán	
2017	Kissing Candice	Donal	
2017	Number One	Gary Adams	
2018	Paul, Apostle of Christ	Aquila	
2020	Boys from County Hell	George Bogue	
2021	The Banishing	Malachi	
2024	Sew Torn	Hudson Armitage	
2024	The Watchers	Professor Rory Kilmartin	

=== Television ===
Year	Title	Role	Notes
1988	The Modern World: Ten Great Writers	Stephen Dedalus	Documentary
1990	Who Bombed Birmingham?	IRA man in cottage	Television film
1990–1991	Making Out	Gavin	6 episodes
1991	Shrinks	Kevin Saunders	Episode #1.2
1991	All Good Things	Vincent Gibney	6 episodes
1991	Chimera	Peter Carson	4 episodes
1991	The Play on One	Rudy	Episode: "Out of the Blue"
1993	Peak Practice	Father Davey	Episode: "Impulsive Behavior"
1993	The Young Indiana Jones Chronicles	Sean O'Casey	Episode: "Ireland, April 1916"
2001	The Seventh Stream	Tomas Dunhill	Television film
2002	Boston Public	Jerry	Episode: "Chapter Thirty-One"
2005	The Baby War	Pierce O'Carroll	Television film
2005	Bleak House	Nemo	2 episodes
2007	The Yellow House	Paul Gauguin	Television film
2007	Spooks	Davie King	Episode: "Isolated"
2008	Trial & Retribution	Gary Webster	Episode: "Kill the King: Part 1"
2008	The Passion	Sagan	4 episodes
2009, 2012	Merlin	Balinor	2 episodes
2010	Silent Witness	Tom Flannery	2 episodes
2010	Mo	Gerry Adams	Television film
2010	The Nativity	Gabriel	3 episodes
2011	Vera	Edmund Fulwell	Episode: "The Crow Trap"
2011	The Jury	Alan Lane	5 episodes
2012	Labyrinth	Simon de Montfort	Miniseries; 2 episodes
2013	Crossing Lines	Frankie	Episode: "The Terminator"
2013–2016	The Fall	Assistant Chief Constable Jim Burns	17 episodes
2014	The Musketeers	Luca Sestini	Episode: "A Rebellious Woman"
2014	Shetland	Frank Blake	2 episodes S2 E5; E6
2014	The Assets	Vitaly Yurchenko	4 episodes
2015	The Trials of Jimmy Rose	DI Steve McIntyre	3 episodes
2016	One of Us	Bill Douglas	4 episodes
2018	The Terror	John Bridgens	5 episodes
2019	Tin Star	Pastor Johan Nickel	7 episodes
2019	Harlots	Jonas Young	Episode #3.1
2019	Medici	Pope Sixtus IV	3 episodes
2020–2022	The Head	Arthur Wilde	Main role
2023	Blue Lights	James McIntyre	6 episodes

== Awards and nominations ==
Year	Award	Category	Nominated work	Result	Ref.
1985	British Academy Film Awards	BAFTA for Most Promising Newcomer To Film	Cal	Nominated	
1995	Australian Film Institute Awards	AFI Best Actor in a Lead Role	Angel Baby	Won	
1996	Film Critics Circle of Australia	Best Actor - Male	Angel Baby	Won	
1997	Satellite Awards	Satellite Award for Best Supporting Actor – Motion Picture	Moll Flanders	Nominated	
2000	Fort Lauderdale International Film Festival	Jury Award for Best Actor	Best	Won	
2005	IFTA Film & Drama Awards	Best Supporting Actor in Television	The Baby War	Nominated	
