= John Sessions =

British actor and comedian (1953–2020)

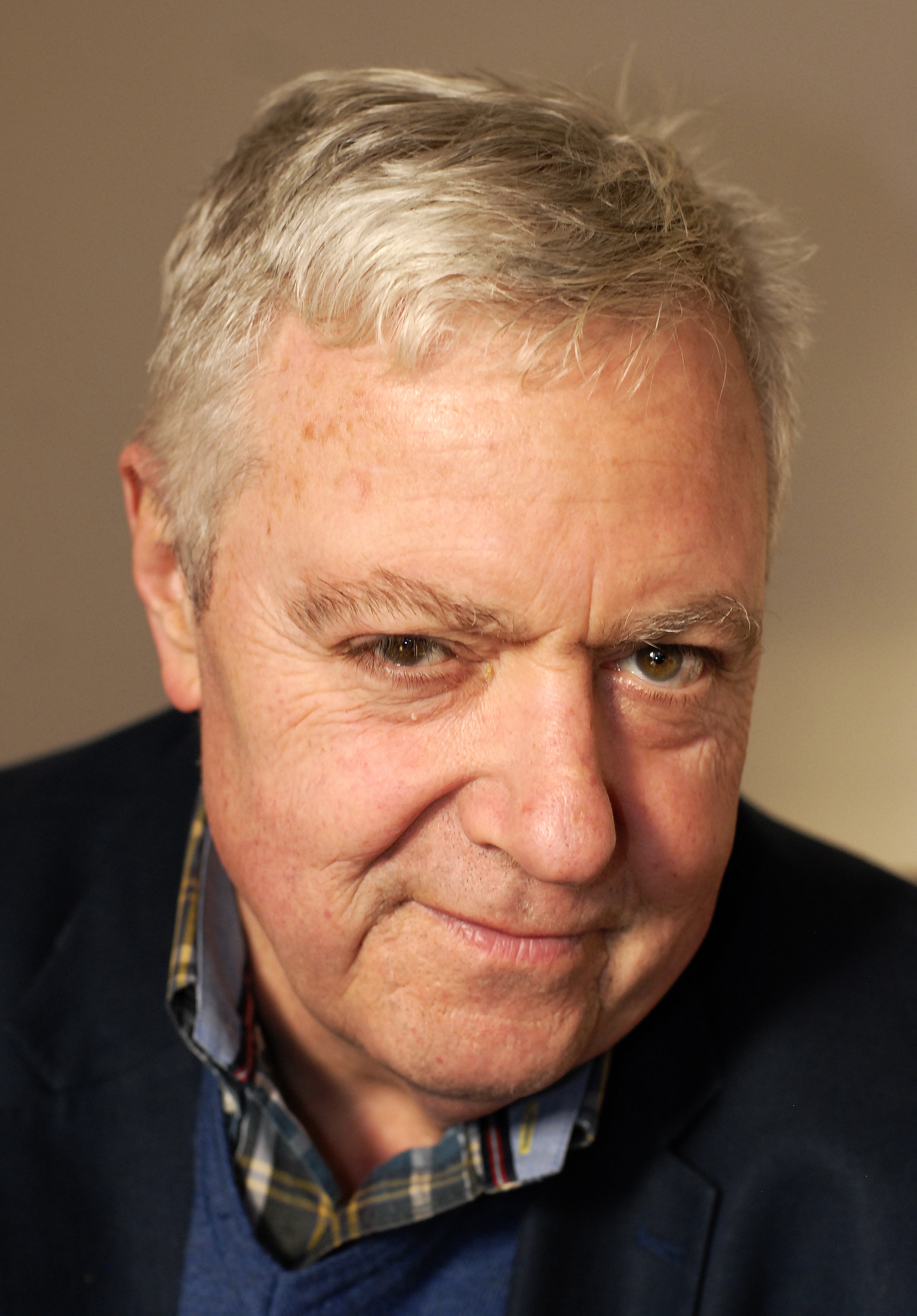
- Sessions in 2018
- Born: John Marshall; 11 January 1953; Largs, Scotland, or Bedford, England (Note: While Sessions is often reported to have been born in Largs, Ayrshire, the Dictionary of National Biography, citing his birth certificate, give his place of birth as Bedford, which is also where his birth was registered.)
- Died: 2 November 2020 (aged 67); London, England
- Education: University College of North Wales (BA, MA); McMaster University; Royal Academy of Dramatic Art (BA)
- Occupations: Actor, comedian
- Years active: 1980–2020
- Television: Whose Line Is It Anyway? (UK); Stella Street

John Sessions (born John Marshall; 11 January 1953 – 2 November 2020) was a British actor and comedian. He was known as a regular performer on comedy improvisation show Whose Line Is It Anyway?, as co-creator, co-writer and co-star of the sitcom Stella Street, as a panellist on QI, and as a character actor in numerous films, both in the UK and Hollywood.

== Early life ==
John Sessions was born as John Marshall on 11 January 1953 in Largs to John and Esme (née Richardson) Marshall. His family was Scottish; his father was a gas engineer from Largs, Ayrshire, and his mother was from Glasgow. He had an older brother, Bill, and a twin sister, Maggie. He was raised in Bedford and St Albans.

=== Education ===
Sessions was educated at Bedford Modern School, an independent school for boys (now co-educational), and Verulam School, St Albans, followed by the University College of North Wales in Bangor, from which he graduated with an MA in English literature. At university, he had begun to appear to audiences with his comedy in shows such as "Look back in Bangor" and "Marshall Arts". He later studied for a PhD on John Cowper Powys at McMaster University in Hamilton, Ontario, Canada, although he did not complete the doctorate.

This period in his life was unhappy. In a "Worst of Times" column for The Independent from around 1990, he talked of how the freezing Canadian weather had depressed him, he was smoking "far too many cigarettes" and "had a couple of disastrous flings", and described his PhD dissertation as "200 pages of rubbish".

== Career ==
Sessions attended RADA in the late 1970s, studying alongside Kenneth Branagh; the two would work together on many occasions later in their careers. His name change occurred when he became a performer, owing to the presence of a John Marshall already on the Equity register. In the early 1980s, he worked on the small venue comedy circuit with largely improvised freewheeling fantasy monologues. He topped a double bill with French and Saunders during this period. He had a number of small parts in films including The Sender (1982), The Bounty (1984) and Castaway (1986).

Sessions played to his strengths in improvisation and comedy with his one-man stage show Napoleon, which ran in London's West End for some time in the mid-1980s. He and Stephen Fry were the only two regular panellists on the original radio broadcast of Whose Line Is It Anyway? in the late 1980s. When the show, still hosted by Clive Anderson, made the transition to television, Fry departed from regular appearances, but Sessions remained the featured panellist for the first season. A frequent player in the second, he did not appear again after his two appearances in the third series.

A gifted impressionist who also voiced characters for Spitting Image, he drew heavily on his extensive literary education and developed a reputation for being "a bit of a swot", being able to quote extensive passages of text and make endless cultural and historical references. His ready ability to switch between accents and personae meanwhile allowed his career in improvisation to flourish. On Whose Line Is It Anyway?, his ability to affect the contrived witticisms of Restoration Comedy became an audience favourite. In 1987 he played Lionel Zipser in Channel 4's mini-series Porterhouse Blue.

In 1989, he starred in his own one-man TV show, John Sessions. Filmed at the Donmar Warehouse in London, the show involved Sessions performing before a live audience who were invited to nominate a person, a location and two objects from a selection, around which Sessions would improvise a surreal performance for the next half-hour. This series prompted two further one-man TV shows: John Sessions' Tall Tales (1991) and John Sessions' Likely Stories (1994). Although billed as improvisation, these were increasingly pre-planned. In an interview headlined 'Who The Hell Does John Sessions Think He Is?' in Q magazine in the early 1990s, he admitted that some of his improv was not entirely spontaneous, but that if it were advertised as scripted 'it had to be funnier'. 1991 also saw Sessions in the BBC drama Jute City, a three-part thriller concerning a sinister Masonic bunch of villains, co-starring with vocalist Fish (Derek W. Dick, singer in the first incarnation of rock band Marillion).

In 1994, Sessions auditioned for the role of the Eighth Doctor in Doctor Who. In 1996, he was commissioned by the Royal Academy of Arts to write "Paint, said Fred", the life of Frederic, Lord Leighton, the pre-eminent Victorian artist, in a one-man show that used his comic writing abilities and his gift for impersonation.

Sessions also starred in Stella Street, a surreal "soap opera" comedy about a fantasy suburban British street inhabited by celebrities such as Michael Caine and Al Pacino, which he conceived with fellow impressionist Phil Cornwell, the two of them playing several parts in each episode.

Sessions later returned to formal acting, with parts ranging from James Boswell (to Robbie Coltrane's Samuel Johnson) in the UK TV comedy drama Boswell and Johnson's Tour of the Western Isles (1993) to Doctor Prunesquallor in the BBC adaptation of Gormenghast (2000) and in 1998 as Hercules Fortesque, a BBC HR manager in the BBC mini-series In The Red adapted from the book and the BBC radio series by Mark Taverner. He provided the voice of the Professor in The Adventures of Pinocchio in 1996. He also appeared in several Shakespeare films, playing Macmorris in Kenneth Branagh's Henry V (1989), Philostrate in A Midsummer Night's Dream (1999), and Salerio in the movie The Merchant of Venice (2004), with Al Pacino and Jeremy Irons. He also contributed "Sonnet 62" to the 2002 compilation album When Love Speaks (EMI Classics), which consists of famous actors and musicians interpreting Shakespearean sonnets and play excerpts.

In between appearing in regular film and TV roles, Sessions made appearances on Have I Got News for You and, more recently, as a semi-regular panellist on QI. He was one of four panellists, including the permanent Alan Davies, on the inaugural episode of QI, in which he demonstrated his effortless memory of the birth and death dates of various historical figures (while simultaneously and apologetically deeming the knowledge of such facts "a sickness").

On radio, Sessions was a guest in December 1997 on the regular BBC Radio 3 show Private Passions, presented by Michael Berkeley, not as himself but as a 112-year-old Viennese percussionist called Manfred Sturmer, who told anecdotes (about Brahms, Clara Schumann, Richard Strauss, Arnold Schoenberg and others) so realistically that some listeners did not realise that the whole thing was a hoax. Other Sessions' creations appeared on Berkeley's show in subsequent years. Sessions had taken the role of narrating the popular Asterix stories for audiobook, since the death of Willie Rushton.

Sessions made a guest appearance in a special webcast version of Doctor Who, in a story called Death Comes to Time, in which he played General Tannis. He occasionally appeared in the BBC series Judge John Deed as barrister Brian Cantwell QC. In 2007, he guest-starred in the Doctor Who audio adventure 100.

In 2006, Sessions presented some of the BBC's coverage of The Proms and featured in one of the two Jackanory specials, voicing the characters and playing the storyteller in the audiobook version of Paul Stewart and Chris Riddell's children's book Muddle Earth. In 2007 he appeared in the final episode of the second series of Hotel Babylon, playing hotel owner Donovan Credo, and as Geoffrey Howe in 2009's Margaret. In 2010, he played Kenny Prince in Sherlock.

Sessions appeared in the teen drama TV show Skins in 2011 as one of two adopted fathers of Franky Fitzgerald. He also appeared as a Brummie vicar in an episode of Outnumbered on BBC One.

He had the distinction of playing two British prime ministers in films, Harold Wilson in Made in Dagenham and Edward Heath in The Iron Lady. In 2013 he appeared in the premiere production of the new play Longing.

In 2014, he made a short appearance in Outlander as Arthur Duncan. In October 2014, Sessions was heard as Gus, the mysterious, psychopathic computer that controlled the eponymous train/spaceship in the Doctor Who episode "Mummy on the Orient Express" as well as appearing as Mycroft Holmes in the 2015 film Mr. Holmes.

In addition to appearing in the role of Arthur Lowe in the 2015 drama We're Doomed! The Dad's Army Story. he also played Dr Hermann in the 2016 film Florence Foster Jenkins.

Sessions narrated a 10-part radio adaptation of The Adventures of Captain Bobo on Fun Kids in 2020, which was still running at the time of his death.

== Personal life ==
Sessions was gay. He was outed in a 1994 Evening Standard article, while starring in the comedy My Night with Reg, a play set in London's gay community.

A Eurosceptic, Sessions voiced his support for the UK Independence Party (UKIP) in 2014. He stated, "I get so bored with people going, 'UKIP are a bunch of racists.' They're nothing of the kind. Nigel Farage talks more sense than the rest of the politicians put together. The United States of Europe is madness."

He argued for the abolition of the Scottish, Welsh and European parliaments. In August 2014, he was one of 200 public figures who were signatories to a letter to The Guardian expressing their hope that Scotland would vote to remain part of the United Kingdom in September's referendum on that issue.

== Death ==
Sessions died at his home in Raynes Park, South London on 2 November 2020, aged 67. His agent noted that he had a heart condition; his entry in the Dictionary of National Biography, citing his death certificate, gives the exact cause of death as suicide, caused by "an excess of aspirin, paracetamol, and caffeine".

The team behind the BBC television programme QI praised his "incredible wit and encyclopaedic knowledge [which] played a huge part in the show's history."

A memoir of Sessions by a longtime friend was published in 2023.

== Filmography ==
=== Film ===
Year	Title	Role	Notes
1980	Animalympics		Uncredited
1981	The Great Muppet Caper	Muppet Performer	Uncredited
1982	The Sender	Patient	
1984	The Bounty	Steward John Smith	
1984	The Muppets Take Manhattan	Muppet Performer	Uncredited
1986	Sky Bandits	Flight	
1986	Castaway	Man in Pub	
1986	Whoops Apocalypse	Mr Sweetzer	
1989	Henry V	Macmorris	
1990	Sweet Revenge	John Michaels	
1991	The Pope Must Die	Dino	
1992	Freddie as F.R.O.7	Scotty	Voice
1994	Princess Caraboo	Prince Regent	
1995	In the Bleak Midwinter	Terry Du Bois (Queen Gertrude)	
1996	The Adventures of Pinocchio	The Professor	
1997	My Night with Reg	Daniel	
1998	The Scarlet Tunic	Humphrey Gould	
1998	Cousin Bette	Musical Director	
1999	A Midsummer Night's Dream	Philostrate	
1999	Faeries	Chudley	Voice
1999	The Comedy Trail: A Shaggy Dog Story	Eileen Huggett	TV special
2000	One of the Hollywood Ten	Paul Jarrico	
2001	The Kingdom of Bones	William Rutherford	
2001	High Heels and Low Lifes	Director	
2002	Gangs of New York	Harry Watkins / Lincoln	
2004	Hawking	Dennis Sciama	
2004	Stella Street: The Movie	Mrs. Huggett / Keith Richards / Jeremy Hickman; Joe Pesci / Dean Baraclough / News Reader; Jack Flatley / Johnny Van Damm / Muthatrucker; Lord Tony Stanford / Dustin Hoffman / The Vicar; Policeman / Al Pacino	
2004	Lighthouse Hill	Mr. Reynard	
2004	The Merchant of Venice	Salerio	
2004	Five Children and It	Peasemarsh	
2005	Rag Tale	Felix Miles Sty	
2006	The Good Shepherd	Valentin Mironov No. 1 / Yuri Modin	
2007	Intervention	Joe	
2008	Inconceivable	Finbar "Finn" Darrow	
2009	The Last Station	Dr. Dušan Makovický	
2009	Nativity	Mr Lore	
2010	The Making of Plus One	Derek	
2010	Made in Dagenham	Prime Minister Harold Wilson	
2011	The Iron Lady	Edward Heath	
2012	The Domino Effect	Talk Show Host	
2013	Filth	Bob Toal	
2014	Pudsey the Dog: The Movie	Thorne	
2014	The Silent Storm	Mr. Smith	
2015	Mr. Holmes	Mycroft Holmes	
2015	Legend	Lord Boothby	
2016	The Rack Pack	Ted Lowe	
2016	Florence Foster Jenkins	Dr Hermann	
2016	Whisky Galore!	Doctor McLaren	
2016	Denial	Richard J. Evans	
2017	Loving Vincent	Julien Tanguy	Voice
2017	Finding Your Feet	Mike Abbott	
2019	Intrigo: Dear Agnes	Pumpermann	
2021	Belfast	Joseph Tomelty as Marley	Posthumous release

=== Television ===
Year	Title	Role	Notes
1984	Danger: Marmalade at Work	Announcer / Scorpion	2 episodes
1984	Laugh??? I Nearly Paid My Licence Fee		Also writer
1985	Happy Families	Dean	Episode: "Cassie"
1985	Tender Is the Night	Young Scot	Episode: "Episode Six"
1986	Boon	Barney Spitz	Episode: "Box 13"
1986	Spitting Image	Prince Edward / Caspar Weinberger / Laurence Olivier	Voice, 13 episodes
1986	Girls on Top	Rodney	Episode: "Who's Ya Uncle Shelley?"
1986	The Madness Museum	Dr. Arthur Foulis Uwins	TV movie
1987	Gramsci: Everything that Concerns People	Antonio Gramsci	TV movie
1987	Porterhouse Blue	Zipser	3 episodes
1988	Menace Unseen	Larry Knight	3 episodes
1988–1991	Whose Line Is It Anyway?	Himself	24 episodes
1989	Agatha Christie's Poirot	Radio Voice Overs	Voice, Episode: "Four and Twenty Blackbirds"
1989	A Day in Summer	Croser	TV movie
1990	One Foot in the Grave		Voice, Episode: "Dramatic Fever"
1990	Die Fledermaus	Frosch	TV movie
1991	The New Statesman	Lord Penistone	Episode: "Let Them Sniff Cake"
1991	John Sessions' Tall Tales		6 episodes: also writer
1991	Jute City	McMurdo	3 episodes
1992	Life with Eliza	Eliza's husband	12 episodes
1993	Screenplay	James Boswell	Episode: "Boswell & Johnson's Tour of the Western Isles"
1994	Citizen Locke	John Locke	TV movie
1994	John Sessions' Likely Stories		6 episodes; also writer
1994	Nice Day at the Office	Tippit	6 episodes
1997	The History of Tom Jones: A Foundling	Henry Fielding	5 episodes
1997–2000	Stella Street	Various characters	Also writer and creator
1998	In the Red	Hercules Fortescue	3 episodes
1998	Queen's Park Story	The Owl	TV movie
2000	Gormenghast	Dr Alfred Prunesquallor	4 episodes
2001	Murder Rooms: The Dark Beginnings of Sherlock Holmes	Prof. Rutherford	Episode: "The Kingdom of Bones"
2001	Randall and Hopkirk (Deceased)	Combe Fishacre	Episode: "O Happy Isle"
2001–2002	Death Comes to Time	General Tannis	Voice, 5 episodes
2002	The Inspector Lynley Mysteries	John Corntel	Episode: "Well Schooled in Murder"
2002	George Eliot: A Scandalous Life	George Henry Lewes	TV movie
2002	Dalziel and Pascoe	Charlie Penn	2 episodes
2002–2005	Judge John Deed	Brian Cantwell, Q.C.	3 episodes
2003	Midsomer Murders	Barrett Filby	Episode: "Painted in Blood"
2003	That'll Teach 'Em	Narrator	Voice: 5 episodes
2003	The Lost Prince	Mr. Hansell	TV movie
2003–2012	QI	Himself	10 episodes
2004	The Legend of the Tamworth Two	Rival Editor	TV movie
2005	Absolute Power	John Kennedy	Episode: "Spinning America"
2005	The English Harem	Ridley	TV movie
2006	Low Winter Sun	Professor Barry Lennox	Miniseries
2006	Agatha Christie's Marple	Cardew Pye	Episode: "The Moving Finger"
2006	Jackanory	Storyteller	Episode: "Muddle Earth"
2007	Reichenbach Falls	Professor Bell	TV movie
2007	New Tricks	Dr Finlay McKenzie	Episode: "Casualty"
2007	Hotel Babylon	Donovan Credo	Episode: "Episode 8"
2007	Ronni Ancona & Co	Special Guest	2 episodes
2007	Oliver Twist	Mr Sowerberry	2 episodes
2009	Margaret	Geoffrey Howe	TV movie
2009	Breaking the Mould	Edward Mellanby	TV movie
2010	Lewis	Professor Rufus Strickfaden	Episode: "Falling Darkness"
2010	Sherlock	Kenny Prince	Episode: "The Great Game"
2010	Just William	Mr. Wellbecker	Episode: "William Holds the Stage"
2011	Outnumbered	Vicar	Episode: "The Funeral"
2011	Rab C. Nesbitt	Chief Inspector Haggerty	Episode: "Broke"
2011	The Comic Strip Presents...	Tebbit	Episode: "The Hunt for Tony Blair"
2011	Little Crackers	Dr. Edward Cole	Episode: "Alan Davies' Little Cracker: The Curious Incident Of The Dog In The Daytime"
2011–2012	Skins	Geoff Fitzgerald	2 episodes
2012	Dead Boss	Sir Humphreys	Episode: "Episode six"
2012	Shameless	Father McGinn	Episode: "All Fall Down"
2013	Mr Selfridge	Sir Arthur Conan Doyle	Episode: "Episode 7"
2014	Blandings	Lord Didcot	Episode: "Necessary Rhino"
2014	Doctor Who	Gus	Voice, Episode: "Mummy on the Orient Express"
2014–2015	Outlander	Arthur Duncan	2 episodes
2015	Moone Boy	Dr. Stephen Gnot	Episode: "Unidentified Feckin' Objects"
2015	Jonathan Strange & Mr Norrell	John Murray	2 episodes
2015	We're Doomed! The Dad's Army Story	Arthur Lowe	TV movie
2016	Mid Morning Matters with Alan Partridge	The Partridge Playhouse Players	Voice, Episode: "Episode 1"
2016	Upstart Crow	Lord Inquisitor	Episode: "Love Is Not Love"
2016	The Rack Pack	Ted Lowe	TV movie
2016	Friday Night Dinner	Mr. Murray	Episode: "The Carpet Cleaner"
2017	Father Brown	Reverend Adam Gillespie	Episode: "The Eve of St John"
2017	The Loch	DCI Frank Smilie	ITV drama series
2018	Death in Paradise	Hugh Davenport	Episode: "Murder on the Day of the Dead"
2019	Victoria	Lord John Russell	Series 3
2020	The Great	Bishop Tarcinkus	Episode: "Moscow Mule"
