= Orla Brady =

Irish actress (born 1961)

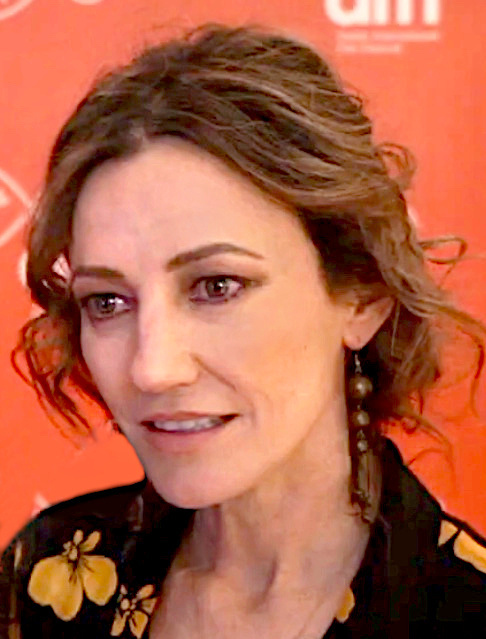
- Brady at the 2020 Dublin International Film Festival
- Born: 28 March 1961 (age 65); Dublin, Ireland
- Education: École Philippe Gaulier
- Occupation: Actress
- Years active: 1991–present
- Spouse: Nick Brandt (m. 2002)

Orla Brady (born 28 March 1961) is an Irish theatre, television, and film actress born in Dublin. Named in 2020 by The Irish Times as one of Ireland's greatest actors, she has received seven IFTA Award (Irish Film & Television Academy) nominations, a Saturn Award nomination, the Abbey Theatre Award, and Best Actress from the Monte Carlo International Film Festival.

Brady's diverse television credits include Into the Badlands (2016–2019), Mistresses (2008–2010), Star Trek: Picard (2020–2023), Bosch: Legacy (2025), Fringe (2008–2013), Banished (2015), Doctor Who (2013), American Odyssey (2015), American Horror Story (2018), and VisionQuest (2026). On film, Brady's credits include her Award-winning performance in A Love Divided (1999), The Luzhin Defence (2000), Silent Grace (2001), The Foreigner (2017), Rose Plays Julie (2019), and opposite Anthony Hopkins in Freud's Last Session (2023).

Brady trained at École Philippe Gaulier in Paris before an extensive stage career in Dublin and London, starring at the Royal National Theatre, the Abbey Theatre, the Gate Theatre, and on the West End. In 2019, She won the Abbey Theatre Award for her performance in On Broken Wings.

== Early life and education ==
Orla Brady was born on 28 March 1961 in Dublin, (Note: Doctor Who: The Complete History states that Brady was born in Bray, County Wicklow.) one of four children born to Catherine and Patrick Brady. At one time, her parents were the owners of an establishment called Oak Bar, in Temple Bar, Dublin. She lived in Bray, County Wicklow, Ireland, from birth until the age of seven. She was educated at a convent of the Ursulines in Cabinteely, Dublin.

Brady began training in performance in 1986, with a year in Paris; she studied at École Philippe Gaulier, and secured a place at Marcel Marceau's École Internationale de Mimodrame de Paris. As she spoke of the time in interview, "there was a lot of clowning around, buffoonery and fencing. It was then that my own style kind of blossomed."

== Career ==
Brady began appearing regularly in television roles in the 1990s. Substantial television roles have included Star Trek: Picard (2022), Into the Badlands (2016 – 2019), Mistresses (2008 – 2010), Jo (2013), American Odyssey (2015) and Bosch: Legacy (2025).

Notable feature film work has included The Foreigner (2017) with Pierce Brosnan and Jackie Chan, Rose Plays Julie (2019) with Aiden Gillen, The Price of Desire (2015), A Love Divided (1999) and Silent Grace (2001).

She began her career touring with Balloonatics Theatre Company, in productions of Hamlet and Finnegans Wake. Returning to Dublin after studying in Paris, she performed the role of Adela in House of Bernarda Alba in 1989 and Natasha in a 1990 production of Three Sisters, both at the Gate Theatre. After moving to London, she played Kate in Brian Friel's Philadelphia, Here I Come!, which later transferred from the King's Head Theatre to the West End. Brady performed as Ghislane in Stephen Poliakoff's Blinded by the Sun, staged at the Royal National Theatre in England in 1996.

Since moving to California in 2001, Brady has also appeared in Family Law, where she played Naoise O'Niell, a series that ran for 3 years on CBS. She also starred in Nip/Tuck, a US drama about plastic surgeons (in which she played Dr. Jordan), and starred as Claire Stark in Shark (2008). In 2008, she appeared in "Firewall", the second episode of the BBC series Wallander. She also appeared as Meredith Gates, a fleecing art collector who herself is conned in the first series of the British series Hustle. Commencing in 2009, Brady portrayed Elizabeth Bishop, the wife of Walter Bishop and the mother of Peter Bishop in the Fox television series Fringe. In 2010, she played Catherine in the TV series The Deep, alongside James Nesbitt, and starred as Katie Dartmouth in the TV series Strike Back.

In 2012, she appeared in the ITV series Eternal Law as Mrs Sheringham, an angel who fell in love with a human and became mortal, and played Taryn in the Sky One series Sinbad. In late 2013, she appeared as the Countess Vera Rossakoff in the television adaptation of The Labours of Hercules, part of the final series of Agatha Christie's Poirot alongside David Suchet. Brady appeared in a special production in the BBC science-fiction series Doctor Who, the 25 December 2013 Christmas special, The Time of the Doctor (as the character Tasha Lem). In 2014, she filmed Banished, playing Anne Meredith.

In 2015, Brady appeared as architect Eileen Gray in Irish director Mary McGuckian's The Price of Desire, which was in festivals in 2016 (and found a digital distributor in 2020). From 2016 to 2019, she had a main role in the AMC martial arts drama series Into the Badlands as Lydia. Brady had a recurring role in a season of the American Horror Story franchise, portraying Dr. Hopple in American Horror Story: 1984, the ninth season of the FX horror anthology television series.

As of 2022, Brady has had a recurring role in the science fiction television series, Star Trek: Picard, as Laris, wife of the now-deceased Zhaban (Jamie McShane), the two being former members of the Romulan Tal Shiar and now, workers in the wine production and home of Picard at his Chateau.

== Awards and recognition ==
Brady won the 1999 award for Best Actress at the Monte Carlo International Film and Television Festival for her starring role as Sheila Cloney in the RTÉ-BBC co-production, A Love Divided . In 2020, Brady was listed as number 43 on The Irish Times list of Ireland's 50 best film actors. Brady was also nominated several times for best actress by the Irish Film and Television Academy.

=== Modelling images used in artwork ===
In the 1980s, while she was in her mid-20s, Brady modelled for an artists' guide publication. She recalled in 2008 that the studio shoot had paid about £50 for her day's work, at a time when she welcomed the income, with her acting career yet to take off. Photographed in a number of dancing poses, the resulting series of figure studies featuring Brady appeared in the Illustrator's Figure Reference Manual. (Note: This publication is: Illustrator's Figure Reference Manual. London: Bloomsbury. 1987 ISBN 978-0-74750-008-7.) More than 25 years later, it was noted that one of these images of Brady, posing as part of a dancing couple, was the basis of the main figures in a widely-known painting, The Singing Butler, by artist Jack Vettriano. As stated by Vettriano in 2013, Brady's image had "later inspired [his] most famous painting, The Singing Butler". The identification of the pose study in the Illustrator's Manual with Vettriano's painting led to media reporting that he "owed his composition in part" to that publication. Vettriano, his agent, and Brady herself, have all stated that his work makes use of the image in a way that adheres to norms of artistic practice and was in line with the publisher's intent. (Note: The Guardian article attributes the source of certain figures in Vettriano's paintings to the Illustrator's Manual, but it does not mention Brady as the model for the manual's illustration. The news item on the Jack Vettriano Website does explicitly name Brady as the model photographed in the dancing couple reference illustration, used by Vettriano as the source for the figures in his The Singing Butler, and other paintings, as does The Courier of Dundee's summary of Brady's 2008 Daily Mirror interview.)

== Personal life ==
In 2001, Brady moved to Los Angeles, where she met English photographer Nick Brandt, whom she married in December 2002 in the Chyulu Hills of Kenya. She has discussed in interviews that she originally left Ireland as she found it "a repressive place to be a woman" at the time, with little opportunity. The 2015 marriage equality and 2018 abortion referendums, as well as the expanding Irish industry, changed her mind, making her realise "Oh, this is a different Ireland and it accepts me now." Brady had a "Catholic upbringing", but as of 2002 considered herself an atheist.

== Theatre ==
Year	Title	Role	Company	Director	Notes
1992	Rebecca	Rebecca de Winter	Lyric Players, Belfast	Charles Nowosielski	play by Daphne Du Maurier

== Filmography ==
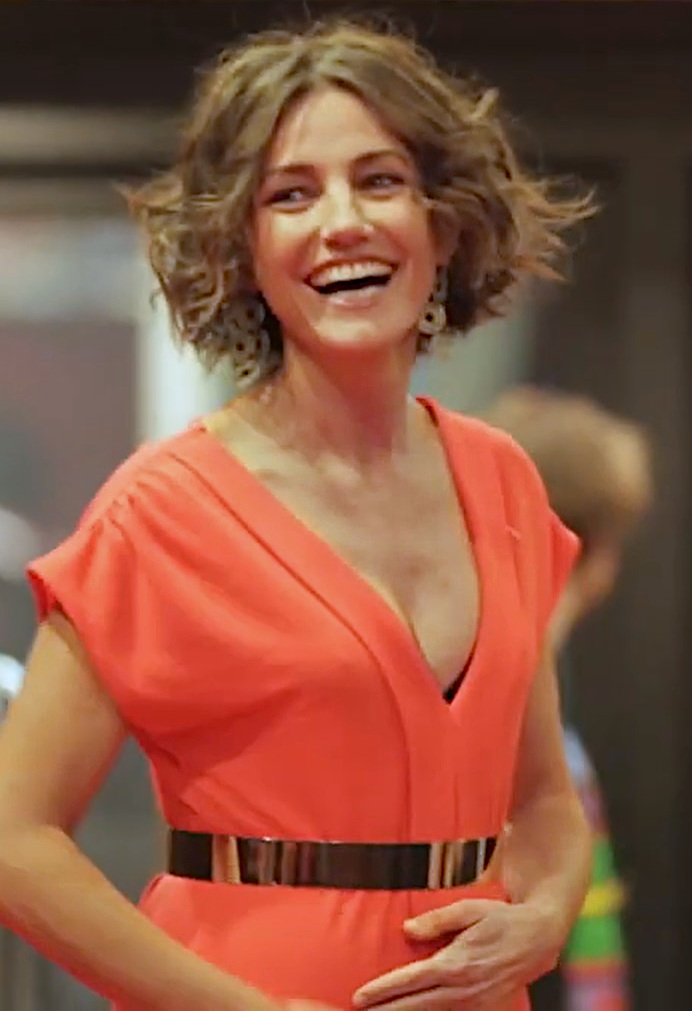
Brady in 2015

Key
†	Denotes films that have not yet been released

=== Film ===
Year	Title	Role	Notes
1994	Words Upon the Window Pane	Vanessa	
1999	A Love Divided	Sheila Kelly Cloney	
2000	The Luzhin Defence	Aunt Anna	
2001	Silent Grace	Eileen	
2002	Fogbound	Ann	
2006	Last Night	Lucy	Short film
2007	32A	Jean Brennan	
2007	How About You	Kate Harris	
2013	Wayland's Song	Grace	
2015	The Price of Desire	Eileen Gray	
2017	The Foreigner	Mary Hennessy	
2019	A Girl from Mogadishu	Emer Costello	
2019	Rose Plays Julie	Ellen	
2022	The Other Me	Marina	
2023	Freud's Last Session	Janie Moore	

=== Television ===
Year	Title	Role	Notes
1993	Minder	Bank Teller	Episode: "Opportunity Knocks and Bruises"
1994	The Bill	Amy	Episode: "No Job for an Amateur"
1994	Absolutely Fabulous	Nurse Mary	Episode: "Hospital"
1994	The Rector's Wife	Sister Josephine	Episode: "1.2"
1995	Dangerfield	Diane Foster	2 episodes
1995	New Voices	Ruby	Episode: "The Treasure of Zavimbi"
1995	Casualty	Wendy	Episode: "Outside Bulawayo"
1995–1996	Out of the Blue	D.S. Rebecca "Becky" Bennett	12 episodes
1996	Pie in the Sky	Kit Kelly de Goris	Episode: "Irish Stew"
1996	The Vicar of Dibley	Aoife	Episode: "The Christmas Lunch Incident"
1997	The Heart Surgeon	Marcella Duggan	Television film
1997	Noah's Ark	Clare Somers	9 episodes
1998	Wuthering Heights	Cathy	Television film
1999	Pure Wickedness	Jenny Meadows	4 episodes
1999	The Magical Legend of the Leprechauns	Kathleen Fitzpatrick	Television movie
2000–2002	Family Law	Naoise O'Neill	43 episodes
2003	Servants	Flora Ryan	6 episodes
2003	The Debt	Angela Jahnsen	Television movie
2003	Chris Ryan's Strike Back	Katie Dartmouth	2 episodes
2004	Hustle	Meredith Gates	Episode: "Picture Perfect"
2004	Nip/Tuck	Dr. Monica Jordan	Episode: "Christian Troy"
2004	Lawless	Liz Bird	Television movie
2004–2005	Proof	Maureen Boland	8 episodes
2005	Revelations	Nora Webber	6 episodes
2005	Empire	Atia	2 episodes
2005	World of Trouble	Joan Denny	Television movie
2006	Sixty Minute Man	Kate Henderson	Television movie
2006	Jesse Stone: Death in Paradise	Lilly Summers	Television movie
2007	Protect and Serve	Dr. Lorna Herrera	Television movie
2007–2008	Shark	Claire Stark	4 episodes
2008	Wallander	Ella Lindfeldt	Episode: "Firewall"
2008–2010	Mistresses	Siobhan Dillon	16 episodes
2010	The Deep	Catherine Donnelly	5 episodes
2010–2012	Fringe	Elizabeth Bishop	5 episodes
2012	Sinbad	Taryn	9 episodes
2012	Eternal Law	Mrs. Sheringham	6 episodes
2013	Jo	Beatrice Dormont	8 episodes
2013	Agatha Christie's Poirot	Countess Rossakoff	Episode: "The Labours of Hercules"
2013	Doctor Who	Tasha Lem	Episode: "The Time of the Doctor"
2015	Banished	Anne Meredith	7 episodes
2015	American Odyssey	Sofia Tsaldari	9 episodes
2015–2019	Into the Badlands	Lydia	25 episodes
2018	Collateral	Phoebe Dyson	3 episodes
2019	American Horror Story: 1984	Dr. Karen Hopple	4 episodes
2020	The South Westerlies	Kate Ryan	6 episodes
2020–2023	Star Trek: Picard	Laris / Tallinn	11 episodes
2022	Death in Paradise	Maggie Harper	Episode: "11.8"
2025	Bosch: Legacy	Siobhan Murphy	5 episodes
2026	VisionQuest	Allison Hogan / F.R.I.D.A.Y.	Miniseries
