= Pascaline Crêvecoeur =

Belgian actress

- Born: 30 April 1982 (age 44); Brussels, Belgium
- Citizenship: French, Belgian
- Occupation: Actress

Pascaline Crêvecoeur (born 30 April 1982) is a French-speaking actress in both cinema and theatre.

She graduated from Insas, National Institute of Performing Arts - Brussels/Belgium, in 2007.

== Filmography ==
=== Cinema ===
Year	Title	Role	Director
2014	Un Homme à la Mer	Dancer	Géraldine Doignon
2014	Grace of Monaco	Grace Kelly's dresser	Olivier Dahan
2014	The Price of Desire	Berenice Abbott	Mary McGuckian
2014	Knock Knock	Léa	Othman Chtouki & Grégory Théatre
2014	Sauce barbare	Elizabeth	Baptiste Grandin
2013	The Fifth Estate (film)	Bar's woman	Bill Condon
2013	Akîtu	The prostitute	Riad Asmar
2013	Laura	Laura	Pascaline Crêvecoeur
2013	Sophie	The young mother	Cédric Bourgeois
2013	Capote percée		Florian Berruti, Adriana Da Fonseca
2012	La bête entre les murs	The young victim	Cédric Bourgeois
2012	Yadel	Delia	Kenan Görgün
2010	Dominique	The production assistant	Jim Taihuttu
2007	Alice	Alice	Pascaline Crêvecoeur
2006	Je m'entête à adorer la liberté libre		Pascaline Crêvecoeur, Déborah Amsens
1992	Les Sept Péchés capitaux	The child	Geneviève Mersch

=== Television ===
Year	Title	Role	Director
2012	À tort ou à raison	Young Joëlle Lens	Alain Brunard
2007	Septième Ciel Belgique		André Chandelle

=== Musical videos ===
Year	Title	Director
2009	Little Ones	Cédric Bourgeois
2008	At Last	Wim Vandekeybus, The Dø

== Theatre ==
Year	Title	Writer	Role	Director	Theatre
2014	The Odyssey	Homer	Nausicaa	Thierry Debroux	Théâtre Royal du Parc
2014	Mehdi met du rouge à lèvres	David Dumortier		Sophie Jaskulski	Théâtre des Doms (Avignon)
2010-2012	L'Araignée	Carla Python		Carla Python	Centre Culturel Jacques Franck
2009-2011	Mélopolis	Patrick Chaboud		Patrick Chaboud	Magic Land Théâtre
2009	Mort si j'veux	François Clarinval		Jean-François Noville	Théâtre de Poche
2008	Les Mutinés du Fish and Ship	Patrick Chaboud		Patrick Chaboud	Magic Land Théâtre
2007	Getting Attention	Martin Crimp		Carla Python	Insas
2007	Evènements			Isabelle Pousseur	Théâtre National de Belgique
2007	Laura Palmer	Pascaline Crêvecoeur	Laura Palmer	Pascaline Crêvecoeur	Insas
1997	Woyzeck	Georg Büchner		Isabelle Pousseur	Théâtre Marni

== French dubbing ==
=== Cinema ===
Year	Title	Role	Original actress	Director
2014	The Raid 2	Isa	Fikha Effendi	Gareth Evans
2013	Girl Most Likely	Tony Award's Announcer	Cynthia Nixon	Shari Springer Berman, Robert Pulcini
2006	Quinceañera	Eileen May Garcia	Alicia Sixtos	Richard Glatzer, Wash Westmoreland

=== Television ===
Year	Title	Role	Original actress	Director
2014	Velvet	Luisa	Manuela Vellés	Carlos Sedes, David Pinillos, Sílvia Quer, Jorge Sánchez-Cabezudo
2014	Japanizi	Anastasia		Rene Dowhaniuk
2014	Summer Break Diaries	Yael		
2014	The Smoke	Keeley, Vicki	Jaycee Borett, Sarah Hoare	Mike Barker, Samuel Donovan, Julian Holmes
2014	Salamander	Sofie Gerardi	Violet Braeckman	Frank van Mechelen
2013	Ultimate Spider-Man	Salem's witch	Misty Lee	Roy Burdine, Alex Soto
2013	Dancing on the Edge	Jessie	Angel Coulby	Stephen Poliakoff
2013	Wizards vs Aliens	Chancellor Kooth, Gemma Raven	Victoria Wicks, Georgina Leonidas	Joss Agnew, Mark Everest
2013	Power Rangers			
2012	Copper	Kayleigh O'Connor	Samantha Weinstein	Clark Johnson
2012	Scan2Go	Titi		Mitsuo Hashimoto

== Commercials ==
Year	Brand
2014	Ixina
2013	Hotel Ibis
2012	Belgacom, Panzani, Sarenza
2011	Quick
