= Words Upon the Window Pane =

- Directed by: Mary McGuckian
- Written by: Mary McGuckian; William Butler Yeats
- Produced by: Mary McGuckian; Tom Reeve; Werner Possardt
- Starring: Geraldine Chaplin; Ian Richardson; Jim Sheridan
- Cinematography: Des Whelan
- Edited by: Kant Pan
- Music by: Niall Byrne
- Release date: 10 June 1994 (US premiere)
- Running time: 98 minutes
- Country: Ireland
- Language: English

Words Upon the Window Pane is a 1994 Irish drama film directed by Mary McGuckian and starring Geraldine Chaplin, Ian Richardson, and Jim Sheridan. McGuckian's directorial debut, it is based on William Butler Yeats' one-act play of the same name. Pat O'Connor was billed to direct the project but he personally offered McGuckian, who was writing the screenplay at the time, the opportunity to also direct. The film received its US premiere on 10 June 1994 at the Lincoln Center for the Performing Arts as part of the largest retrospective of Irish film ever shown outside Ireland. In September that year, the film was screened at the 51st Venice International Film Festival.

== Premise ==
In 1928 Dublin, during séances concerning Jonathan Swift, the spirits of his former lovers, Stella and Vanessa, emerge to resume their ancient quarrel.

== Cast ==
- Geraldine Chaplin as Miss McKenna
- Ian Richardson as Dr. Trench
- Jim Sheridan as Jonathan Swift/Dean Swift
- Geraldine James as Mrs. Henderson
- Orla Brady as Vanessa.
- John Lynch as John Corbet
- Gerard McSorley as Abraham Johnson
- Donal Donnelly as Cornelius Patterson
- Gemma Craven as Mrs. Mallet
- Brid Brennan as Stella
- Hugh O'Conor as Cabin boy
