= Martin Katz (producer) =

Canadian film and television producer and media executive

Martin Katz CM
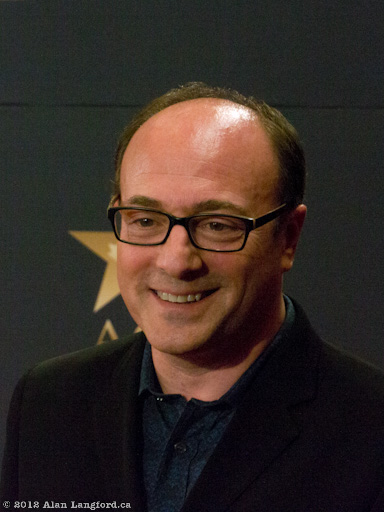
- Katz at the Genie Awards in 2012
- Occupation: Film producer
- Known for: Genie Award winner

Martin F. Katz CM is a Canadian film and television producer and media executive. He is president of the production firm Prospero Pictures, and a former president of the Academy of Canadian Cinema and Television. Prior to establishing Prospero Pictures, Katz was a producer with Atlantis Entertainment and an executive producer of MSNBC Canada.

As a producer, his credits include the television series My Life as a Dog, Married Life, Spectacle: Elvis Costello with..., and Ice Road Truckers, and the films Keeping the Promise, The Claim, The Gospel of John, Hotel Rwanda, Spider, It's a Boy Girl Thing, Shake Hands with the Devil, Inconceivable, The Making of Plus One, A Dangerous Method, Man on the Train, Cosmopolis, and Maps to the Stars.

Katz became chair of the Academy of Canadian Cinema and Television in 2011, and held the role until being succeeded by John Young in 2019. He was appointed to the Order of Canada in 2022.
