= Miki Manojlović =

Serbian actor

- Мики Манојловић
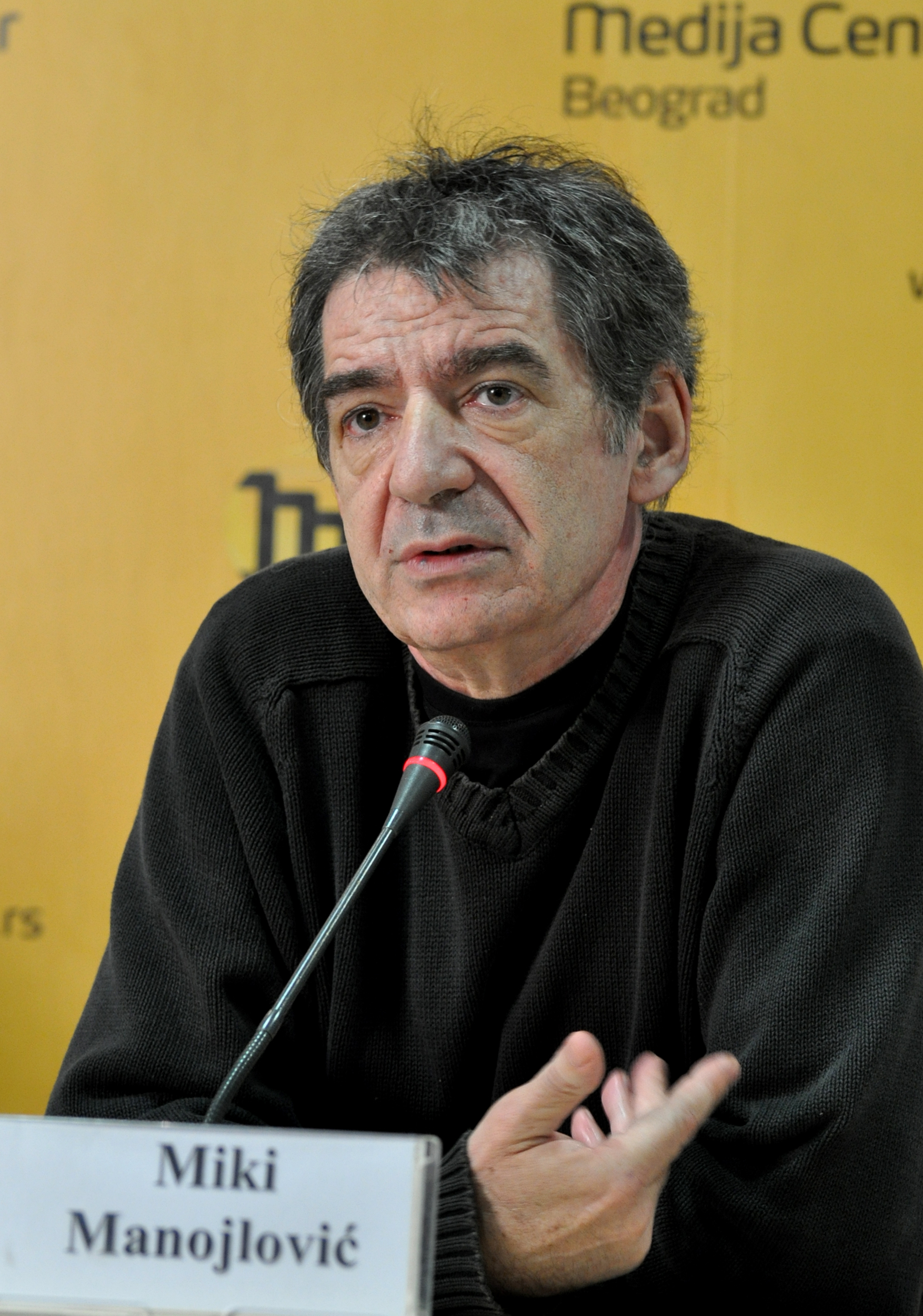
- Manojlović in Belgrade in April 2014 promoting the R&J project, a staging of Romeo and Juliet through the prism of the Serbian-Albanian conflict in Kosovo with actors from Belgrade and Priština.
- Born: Predrag Manojlović; 5 April 1950 (age 76); Belgrade, PR Serbia, Yugoslavia
- Occupation: Actor
- Spouse: Tamara Vučković

Predrag "Miki" Manojlović (Serbian Cyrillic: Предраг "Мики" Манојловић; born 5 April 1950) is a Serbian actor, famous for his starring roles in some of the most important films of Yugoslav cinema. Since the early 1990s, he successfully branched out into movies made outside the Balkans and became active in productions all over Europe.

== Early life ==
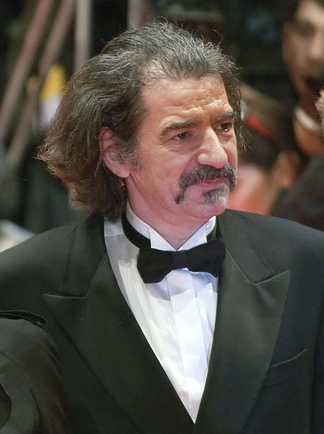
Manojlović at 2007 Berlin International Film Festival

Manojlović was born in Belgrade, the son of stage actors Ivan Manojlović and Zora Doknić. His parents met at KUD Abrašević in Kraljevo, and moved to Niš where Predrag "Miki" was partly brought up. His paternal great-grandfather Petar "Pera" Manojlović was born in Belgrade, and was the first director of the Serbian National Bank. His paternal grandfather Milan Manojlović served in the Serbian Army during World War I, survived the Albanian golgotha, recuperated at Corfu, then participated in the breakthrough of the Thessaloniki Front. Milan went and studied engineering of forestry and mining, at Sorbonne in the 1920s and met Frenchwoman Mari Kolen in Nancy, and the two settled in Serbia in 1930. His grandfather received many Yugoslav awards and orders, and the French Officier Legion of Honour. His maternal grandfather Petar Doknić was a typographer in Belgrade. Manojlović speaks French, which he learnt from his grandmother. He lived in Paris for a while before returning to Belgrade in 1969 on his grandmother's deathbed.

== Career ==
After his screen debut in 1970, young Predrag continued to appear in numerous films and TV dramas made in SFR Yugoslavia, some of which, like the 1975 TV series Grlom u jagode where he memorably played Miki Rubiroza, achieved cult status.

He is arguably best known for the role of the father in Emir Kusturica's 1985 film When Father Was Away on Business and as a tragic opportunist in 1995's Underground (also by Kusturica). He is known for his versatility which helped him make a strong impression both in starring and character roles, as well as dramas and comedies, with his small role in the 1992 hit comedy Mi nismo anđeli being an example of the latter. He played the role of Agostino Tassi in the 1997 film Artemisia and that of Miki in Irina Palm.

During the NATO bombardments in 1999, Miki said: "Westerners must understand that no one can constrain anybody, that the Balkans need to live their own life with their own multiplicity of cultures, religions, languages. They must understand that they should not worsen the situation with their own frustrations and their ideas which do not function, that the more bombs fall in Yugoslavia, the less safety will there be in Europe."

In February 2009, the Government of Serbia named him the president of the Serbian Film Center.

== Personal life ==
Manojlović is married to actress Tamara Vučković with whom he has a son Ivan. He has a daughter Čarna Manojlović from a previous marriage with concert maestro Iskra Uzelac.

== Filmography ==
- Otpisani (TV series) (1974)
- Košava (1974)
- Priča o vojniku (1976)
- Hajka (1977)
- Posljednji podvig diverzanta Oblaka (1978)
- Sok od šljiva (1981)
- Piknik u Topoli (1981)
- Samo jednom se ljubi (1981)
- Sezona mira u Parizu (1981)
- 13. jul (1982)
- Nešto između (1983)
- U raljama života (1984)
- Tajvanska kanasta (1985)
- Jagode u grlu (1985)
- Otac na službenom putu (1985)
- Za sreću je potrebno troje (1985)
- Race for the Bomb (TV miniseries) (1987)
- Vuk Karadžić (TV series) (1987)
- Vreme čuda (1989)
- Seobe (1989)
- Un week-end sur deux (1990)
- Mi nismo anđeli (1992)
- Tito i ja (1992)
- Tango Argentino (1992)
- La Piste du télégraphe (1994)
- Underground (1995)
- Someone Else's America (1995)
- Portraits chinois (1996)
- Gypsy Magic (1997)
- Artemisia (1997)
- Il Macellaio (1998)
- Rane (1998)
- Bure baruta (1998)
- Crna mačka, beli mačor (1998)
- Set Me Free (Emporte-moi) (1999)
- Rien à dire (1999)
- Les Amants criminels (1999)
- Voci (2000)
- Épouse-moi (2000)
- Sans plomb (2000)
- Mortel transfert (2001)
- Jeu de cons (2001)
- Kako loš son (2002)
- Les Marins perdus (2003)
- Mali svet (2003)
- Tor zum Himmel (2003)
- Mathilde (2004)
- Hurensohn (2004)
- Ne fais pas ça (2004)
- 100 minuta slave (2004)
- Mi nismo anđeli 2 (2005)
- Ze film (2005)
- L'Enfer (2005)
- La Fine del mare (2007)
- Klopka (2007)
- Irina Palm (2007)
- Hadersfild (2007)
- Zavet (2007)
- Svetat e golyam i spasenie debne otvsyakade (2008)
- Largo Winch (2008)
- Solemn Promise (2009)
- Just Between Us (2010)
- Cirkus Columbia (2010)
- The Burma Conspiracy (2011)
- The Judgement (2014)
- On the Milky Road (2016)
- Cherchez la femme (2017)
- The Bra (2018)
- The Uncle (2022)
- Guardians of the Formula (2023)

== Awards ==
- Golden Arena for Best Actor (1983), for achievements in Yugoslav cinema
- Golden Arena for Best Actor (1985), for achievements in Yugoslav cinema
- Ring of Dobrica Award (2012), for achievements in Serbian theatre
- Order of Karađorđe's Star, 1st Degree (2021)
- Ordre des Arts et des Lettres-Chevalier (Knight), 2022

== Sources ==
- Hello (2017-04-05). "Miki Manojlović danas slavi rođendan, a njegov život je prava filmska priča". Hello! magazin (in Serbian).
- Manojlović, Miki (10 December 2023). "Autorski tekst Mikija Manojlovića: Radujem se kao klinac EKSPO-u". Blic; B92.
