= Tamara Vučković =

Serbian actress (born 1970)

- Тамара Вучковић
- Born: 1970 (age 55–56); Belgrade, SR Serbia, SFR Yugoslavia (present day Serbia)
- Occupations: Actress; theatre director
- Spouse: Miki Manojlović
- Children: 1

Tamara Vučković (Serbian Cyrillic: Тамара Вучковић; born 1970), also known by her married name Tamara Vučković Manojlović (Serbian Cyrillic: Тамара Вучковић Манојловић), is a Serbian actress who is the current director of the Yugoslav Drama Theatre. She is the wife of fellow Serbian actor Miki Manojlović, with whom she has a son, Ivan.

== Filmography ==
Year	Title	Role	Notes
1992	Tito and Me	Singer in bar	
1992	Bulevar revolucije	Biljana's friend #2	
1993	Broz i ja	Singer in bar	TV series
1995	Simpatija i antipatija	Maid Toda	Television film
1997	Tango je tužna misao koja se pleše		
1997	Ljubav, ženidba i udadba	Juca	Television film
1998	Nikoljdan 1901. godine	Maid Mara	Television film
2000	Victoire ou la Douleur des femmes	Simone Hiff	TV mini-series
2005	Položajnik	Desa	Television film
2009	Na terapiji	Natalija	TV series
2015	The Price of Desire	Louise Dany	
