= Solemn Promise =

2009 film

- Directed by: Srđan Karanović
- Written by: Srđan Karanović
- Starring: Miki Manojlovic
- Cinematography: Slobodan Trninic
- Music by: Zoran Simjanović
- Release date: 2 October 2009
- Running time: 106 minutes
- Country: Serbia
- Language: Serbian

Solemn Promise (Serbian: Беса, romanized: Besa) is a 2009 Serbian drama film directed by Srđan Karanović. The film was selected as the Serbian entry for the Best Foreign Language Film at the 83rd Academy Awards but it did not make the final shortlist.

== Plot ==
The film portrays the drama between Azem, an Albanian man, and Lea, a Slovenian woman married to Filip, a Serb. The events happen when the young couple moves to a place in southern Serbia at the outbreak of World War I, when Filip receives the invitation to join the military ranks. He leaves his young attractive wife in the custody of the middle-aged Albanian. The film speaks about love, the sacred Albanian promise ‘Besa’, as well as the cultural, ethnic, and language barriers in the Balkans. The film shows how the sacred given word can be stronger than love and temptation.

== Cast ==
- Miki Manojlović as Azem
- Iva Krajnc as Lea
- Nebojša Dugalić as Filip
- Radivoje Bukvić as Lieutenant Jevrem
- Ana Kostovska as School teacher
- Radivoj Knežević
- Jovo Makšić as Mane
- Nikola Krneta as Soldier
- Slobodan Filipović as Gendarme

== See also ==
- List of submissions to the 83rd Academy Awards for Best Foreign Language Film
- List of Serbian submissions for the Academy Award for Best Foreign Language Film
