= The Glam Metal Detectives =

- Also known as: "GMD"
- Genre: Comedy
- Created by: Peter Richardson
- Written by: Peter Richardson; Lloyd Stanton; The cast
- Directed by: Peter Richardson
- Starring: Gary Beadle; Mark Caven; Phil Cornwell; Doon Mackichan; Sara Stockbridge; George Yiasoumi
- Opening theme: "Everybody Up"
- Composers: Lol Creme; Trevor Horn
- Country of origin: United Kingdom
- Original language: English
- No. of series: 1
- No. of episodes: 7

Production
- Executive producer: Michael White
- Producer: Nira Park
- Running time: approx 30 mins.

Original release
- Network: BBC 2
- Release: 23 February – 6 April 1995

The Glam Metal Detectives is a comedy show produced by the BBC in 1995. Shown on BBC2 on Thursday nights at 9, it combined sketch and sitcom elements. As with other shows launched in this timeslot, The Glam Metal Detectives attempted to innovate and combine genres. The show consists of a single series of seven episodes.

The series starred Gary Beadle, Phil Cornwell, Doon Mackichan (playing most of the female roles), Sara Stockbridge, George Yiasoumi, and Mark Caven. The scripts were written by the cast, director Peter Richardson, and Lloyd Stanton. The show was designed to appear as if the viewer was channel surfing through a multi-channel wasteland, happening upon spoof adverts, short sketches, and recurring show elements. Like other BBC content of the mid-1990s (such as KYTV), it often lampooned the low-budget quality of satellite television available in the UK at the time.

== Content ==
Show segments included:

- The Glam Metal Detectives themselves. A rock group charged with the mission of "saving the planet's ecology with [their] top-hit records", they fight the evil media mogul Rolston Brocade (Mac McDonald) in between gigs. This segment combined elements of the cultish, kitsch and televisual trash in an unpredictable manner.
- Betty's Mad Dash - a 1930s-style adventure serial about two flappers, Betty and Maisie (Mackichan and Stockbridge), who are on the run from the police. Each episode involved hiding from the police in some period location and robbing people at gunpoint.
- Bloodsports - a short segment portraying, with live sports commentary, crime such as ram raiding, car theft, or a bailiff attempting to take possession of property as if they were recognised sports. The footage often ended with the offenders messing up in some way and getting arrested.
- Running From Death - a self-parody which saw the group running from the Grim Reaper. Each episode would include this sequence, which always resembled the chase sequence in the Betty's Mad Dash section, ending with the group robbing the Grim Reaper at gunpoint.
- The Big Me - a chat show parody featuring Morag (Mackichan), who was extremely self-obsessed and egomaniacal, ignoring her guests and instead talking about herself, only to end up being replaced by her sycophantic chef Steve (Caven).
- Colin Corleone - a nondescript Londoner (Yiasoumi) who believes himself to be the mafia godfather of his neighbourhood after watching The Godfather movies too many times, complete with inept henchmen (Beadle and Cornwell) who are just as deluded or playing along; for example, when his dole is cut off because he refuses to work in Do It All, he arranges a 'hit' on the DSS office worker, shooting him with a water pistol while he has his lunch.
- Happy Hour - the revolting and chainsmoking bouncer and ticket seller of a strip club or clip joint stiff the customers. The bouncer is attracted to one of the acts, 'Vera', and has no idea that she is a man in drag.
- Once an episode, a large man played by Stephen Marcus would, following an explosion, say his cliché line in a variety of different voices: "you 'ad to get involved!" before firing his machine gun.
- Various manipulative American talkshow hosts who would introduce items saying "We'll be: removing this woman's dignity / withholding oxygen from this man / breaking up this marriage ... right after this!"
- Spoof adverts to fill in the gaps, often for everyday items such as keys or bath plugs, small-scale businesses, petty criminals, or share offers for public "services" like The Sea and The Sun, parodying the Thatcher and Major programme of privatisation.

== In other media ==
The series' theme "Everybody Up!", by Trevor Horn and Lol Creme, was released as a CD single, with the main cast appearing in character on Top of the Pops. A soundtrack album was also released.

A one-shot magazine special was published by Marvel UK to coincide with the launch of the show. It mirrored the channel hopping style of the show by featuring various magazine formats and comic book styles. The special was co-written by Peter Richardson, Robert Popper, the cast of the show and the magazine's editor, cartoonist and writer David Leach, who had previously created Psycho Gran for the cult British kids comic, Oink!. The special featured the artwork of - among others - Lew Stringer, David Leach and Art Wetherell. The magazine also used the same artwork for its cover that was used for the show's opening titles and subsequent video release. The special was intended to test the waters for a regular title should the show have been a success, but no more issues were made.

The first three episodes of the series were later released on VHS video.
