= The Bridge of San Luis Rey (2004 film) =

- Promotional poster
- Directed by: Mary McGuckian
- Screenplay by: Mary McGuckian
- Based on: The Bridge of San Luis Rey by Thornton Wilder
- Produced by: Michael Cowan; Samuel Hadida; Howard G. Kazanjian; Garrett McGuckian; Mary McGuckian; Denise O'Dell
- Starring: Robert De Niro; Kathy Bates; Gabriel Byrne; Harvey Keitel; F. Murray Abraham; Geraldine Chaplin
- Cinematography: Javier Aguirresarobe
- Edited by: Kant Pan
- Music by: Lalo Schifrin
- Distributed by: Metropolitan Filmexport (France); Columbia TriStar Films de España (Spain)
- Release dates: 22 December 2004 (Spain); 25 May 2005 (France)
- Running time: 120 minutes
- Countries: France; Spain; United Kingdom
- Language: English
- Budget: $24 million
- Box office: $1.8 million

The Bridge of San Luis Rey is a 2004 drama film directed by Mary McGuckian and featuring an ensemble cast including Robert De Niro, Pilar López de Ayala, F. Murray Abraham, Kathy Bates, Gabriel Byrne, Émilie Dequenne and Harvey Keitel. It is based on Thornton Wilder's 1927 novel. The film was released in 2004 in Spain and 2005 in the U.S. and abroad. Despite praise for its costume design, the film was poorly received by critics.

== Plot ==
Near Lima, Peru, at noon on Friday, 20 July 1714, a bridge woven by the Incas a century earlier collapses while five people are crossing it: Doña María, the Marquess of Montemayor; Pepita, her lady in attendance; Esteban, a scribe; Uncle Pío; and a young child.

The collapse is witnessed by Brother Juniper, a Franciscan friar, who was on his way to cross it. Curious about why God would allow such a tragedy, he decides to take a scientific approach to the question. He sets out to interview those who knew the five victims.

During the subsequent six years, Brother Juniper has managed to compile a huge book questioning if we live our lives according to a plan or if there is no such thing as a bigger scheme.

== Cast ==
- F. Murray Abraham as the Viceroy of Peru
- Kathy Bates as the Marquesa
- Gabriel Byrne as Brother Juniper
- Geraldine Chaplin as the Abbess
- Robert De Niro as the Diego de Parada, the Archbishop of Lima
- Émilie Dequenne as Doña Clara
- Adriana Domínguez as Pepita
- Harvey Keitel as Uncle Pio
- Pilar López de Ayala as Micaela Villegas (La Perichole)
- John Lynch as Captain de Alvarado
- Mark Polish as Manuel
- Michael Polish as Esteban
- Jim Sheridan as The King of Spain
- Dominique Pinon as His Excellency's Fop

== Background and production ==
The film and novel are loosely based on the life of Micaela Villegas (1748–1819), a famous Peruvian entertainer known as La Perricholi, and whose life was the inspiration for the novella Le Carrosse du Saint-Sacrement by Prosper Mérimée, an opéra bouffe, La Périchole by Jacques Offenbach, Jean Renoir's 1953 film Le Carrosse d'or (The Golden Coach), and two earlier film versions: a 1929 silent version, The Bridge of San Luis Rey starring Lili Damita, and a 1944 version, The Bridge of San Luis Rey starring Lynn Bari, Francis Lederer, Akim Tamiroff and Alla Nazimova.

== Reception ==
On Rotten Tomatoes, the film has an approval rating of 4%, based on reviews from 24 critics. The site's consensus states: "Despite an all-star cast and some impressive visuals, The Bridge of San Luis Rey is a lifeless, slow-going adaptation of Thornton Wilder's classic novel."

Stephen Garrett of Time Out wrote, "Why do good actors pop up in bad movies? More perplexingly, why do so many good actors end up in the same bad movie?"

Desson Thomson of The Washington Post wrote, "Even though director-adaptor Mary McGuckian expended much creative energy trying to pump original spirit into the characters, she never brings any of them to life."

In 2022, it was announced that the film had been recut, remastered and rescored to restore it to the version based on the original script, including 40 minutes of previously unseen footage. The Bridge of San Luis Rey: Remastered was released digitally by Giant Pictures in North America.
