= The Making of Plus One =

- Promotional poster
- Directed by: Mary McGuckian
- Written by: Mary McGuckian
- Produced by: Mary McGuckian; Jeff Abberley; Martin Katz
- Starring: Lothaire Bluteau; Geraldine Chaplin; Donna D'Errico; Michael Eklund; Jordi Mollà; Suzan-Lori Parks; Amanda Plummer; John Sessions; Sara Stockbridge; Jennifer Tilly
- Cinematography: Mark Wolf
- Edited by: Matthew Booth; David Freemantle; Alain Jakubowicz
- Release date: January 2010 (Palm Springs Film Festival)
- Running time: 93 min
- Countries: Canada; United Kingdom
- Language: English
- Budget: £3 million

The Making of Plus One is a 2010 British-Canadian comedy film about the independent filmmaking industry. The film was set and shot at the Cannes Film Festival and takes a satirical look at the film industry's obsession with celebrity. It was written and directed by Mary McGuckian and stars Michael Eklund, Suzan-Lori Parks, Lothaire Bluteau, Geraldine Chaplin, Donna D'Errico, Jordi Mollà and Jennifer Tilly.

== Plot ==
The production team of a new film, headed by hopeful director (Parks) and a conniving producer Dave Dallas (Eklund) hold several meetings at the Cannes Film Festival with the hope of achieving financial backing for their film.

== Cast ==
- Michael Eklund as Dave Dallas
- Suzan-Lori Parks as Skye Brown - the director
- Lothaire Bluteau as Gil - the production designer
- Geraldine Chaplin as Geri - the casting director
- Donna D'Errico as Frances Money - the lawyer
- Jordi Mollà as Victor - the D.O.P.
- Amanda Plummer as Kim Owens - the accountant
- John Sessions as Derek - the line producer
- Sara Stockbridge as Rusty Robinson - the writer
- Jennifer Tilly as Amber
- Katie Boland as Starlet
