= Rag Tale =

2005 film by Mary McGuckian

- Film poster
- Directed by: Mary McGuckian
- Starring: Rupert Graves; Jennifer Jason Leigh
- Release date: 12 August 2005 (Locarno)
- Running time: 123 minutes
- Country: United Kingdom
- Language: English

Rag Tale is a 2005 British comedy film directed by Mary McGuckian. It received mainly negative reviews.

== Cast ==
- Rupert Graves - Editor - The Rag, Eddy Somerset Taylor
- Jennifer Jason Leigh - Deputy Editor - The Rag, Mary Josephine (MJ) Morton
- Lucy Davis - Editor's PA - The Rag, Debbs
- John Sessions - Political Editor - The Rag, Felix Miles Sty
- Bill Paterson - News Editor - The Rag, Tulloch (Lucky) Lloyd
- Sara Stockbridge - Fashion Editor - The Rag, Sally May Ponsonby
- Cal MacAninch - Sports Editor - The Rag, Paul (Mac) MacAvoy
- David Hayman - Picture Editor - The Rag, Geoff (P3) Randal
- Simon Callow - Features Editor - The Rag, Cormac (Fat Boy) Rourke
- Malcolm McDowell - Chairman - Global Media Inc, Richard (The Chief) Morton
- Kerry Fox - Editor - The Press, Peach James Taylor
- Ian Hart - Photographer, Morph
