= Man on the Train (2011 film) =

2011 Canadian-Irish film

- Directed by: Mary McGuckian
- Produced by: Martin Katz; Mary McGuckian
- Starring: Donald Sutherland; Larry Mullen Jr.
- Cinematography: Stefan von Bjorn
- Edited by: Matthew Booth
- Music by: Larry Mullen Jr. and Simon Climie
- Release date: May 2011 (Cannes Marché du Film)
- Countries: Canada; Ireland
- Language: English

Man on the Train is a 2011 Canadian-Irish crime-drama film directed by Mary McGuckian, starring Donald Sutherland and Larry Mullen Jr. It is an English-language remake of the 2002 French film of the same name.

== Premise ==
An elderly professor and a mysterious stranger whom the professor has invited to his house are each very envious of the life of the other.

== Cast ==
- Donald Sutherland as The Professor
- Larry Mullen Jr. as The Man
- Graham Greene as Sado
- Tony Nardi as "Loco"
- Kate O'Toole as Vivienne
- Carlo Rota as Max

== Production ==
Filmed in April 2010, it was shot "under the radar" over a 17-day period in the towns of Orangeville and Dundas, Ontario. Because of Mullen's fame as a member of the rock band U2, there was no pre-publicity surrounding his participation in the project, with only Sutherland mentioned in local news coverage.

Upon the film's release, Mullen told the media that he proceeded with making his acting debut after his bandmate, Bono, was hospitalized with a back injury. "Had Bono not hurt his back, it is unlikely I would have made this film," he told the Daily Mirror newspaper in May 2011. "I hope I would have done something else, but you never know. We had a period off - it was only a couple of weeks, but it was enough to take the film on. When you see what's on the screen, it looks like a EUR7million movie, but it's a lot less than that. It's a shoestring budget - we could only shoot for 17 days."

Mullen also told the film website Collider that "Overall, it was incredibly difficult. It didn’t come easy, necessarily, but when I looked back at it, I didn’t look as terrified as I actually was. From my day job, everything you do, you have an opportunity to look at and re-assess and change. With this, I could do everything except change it. It was there. It was on film. I couldn’t go back and say, “Sorry, can I redo that bit?” That was, “Oh, shit!,” but also, “Well, it is what it is. I decided to do this and take it on the chin, if it goes wrong.” The fear, in some ways, was what propelled me. I was afraid, and I didn’t want to get it wrong. I wanted to be better, and I was constantly trying to be better, but I wasn’t quite sure what I was trying to be better at. I had no framework. There was nothing for me to bounce back on. It wasn’t like I could call Donald over and say, “Hey, Donald, how was that? Was that okay for you? Should we have had the light this way?” I had no idea. I was wandering around, getting in the way and standing in the wrong places."

== Release ==
The film was shown at the Cannes Film Festival, but never received a theatrical release anywhere. It was, however, made available on U.S. video on demand services in late 2011. It also was released in the U.S. on DVD.

The Hollywood Reporter gave the film a positive review, calling it a "ripe illumination, buoyed by the sterling lead performances of Sutherland and Mullen." Meanwhile, Variety called the film a "leisurely paced but consistently engrossing tale of two men who come to see in each other the end of a road not taken." Variety added that "with Donald Sutherland offering one of his finest performances and U2 drummer Larry Mullen Jr. demonstrating his proficiency in a character-actor gig, this Canadian-produced version of Patrice Leconte‘s arthouse hit could attract sophisticated viewers when it pulls into VOD and homevid stations Oct. 28."

Other reviews were not as favourable. The Irish Independent called the film "shoddily made and badly put together," and that it "leaps abruptly from scene to juddering scene and is packed with bad dialogue and nasty pauses."
