= This Is the Sea (film) =

- Directed by: Mary McGuckian
- Written by: Mary McGuckian
- Produced by: Michael Garland
- Starring: Samantha Morton; Ross McDade; Gabriel Byrne; Richard Harris
- Cinematography: Des Whelan
- Music by: Mike Scott; Brian Kennedy
- Distributed by: Alliance Releasing
- Release date: 1997
- Running time: 104 minutes
- Countries: United Kingdom; Ireland
- Language: English

This Is the Sea is a 1997 British-Irish film directed and written by Mary McGuckian and produced by Michael Garland. It is a romance film, focusing on the relationship between the character Hazel Stokes, played by Samantha Morton, and Malachy McAliskey, played by Ross McDade.

== Plot ==
The two lovers live in Northern Ireland. Stokes is a Protestant, and McAliskey is Catholic. Their relationship is complicated by the spying of Stokes' brother Jef, played by Marc O'Shea, and by the attempts of Rohan, played by Gabriel Byrne, to recruit McAliskey into the Republican movement. The film also stars Richard Harris as Old Man Jacobs, an ally to the couple.

== Title ==
The film's title comes from the song "This Is the Sea" from the 1985 music album This Is the Sea by the folk-rock band The Waterboys.

The film's soundtrack uses seven different Waterboys songs. Mike Scott, The Waterboys' lead singer, shares music credits for the film with singer Brian Kennedy.

== Release ==
The film was released by Alliance Releasing in the United Kingdom on 13 February 1998 where it grossed £14,746. In the United States and Canada it grossed $5,000.
