= Mary McGuckian =

British film director (born 1963)

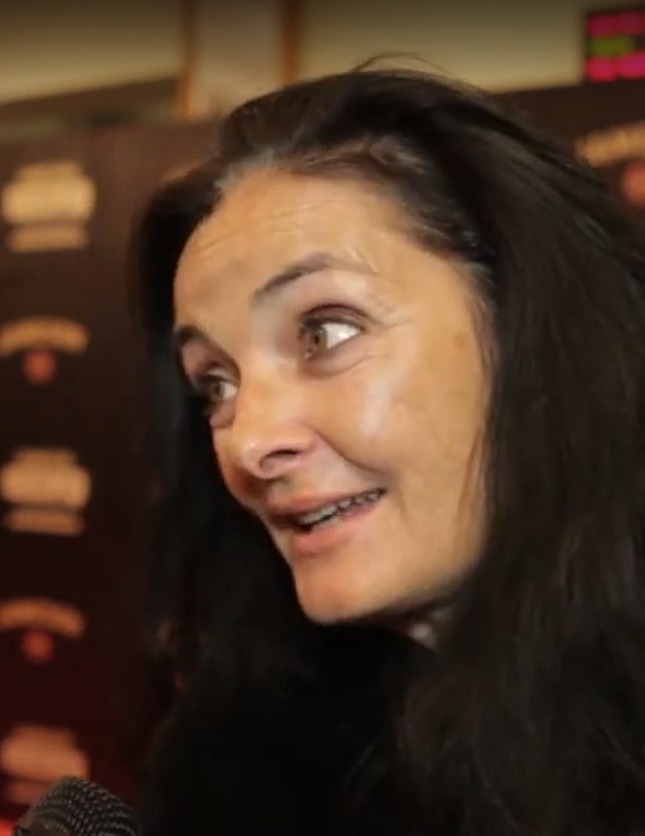
- McGuckian at diff in 2015
- Born: 27 May 1963 (age 63); Northern Ireland
- Occupations: Actress, director, writer, producer
- Spouse: John Lynch (m. 1997; sep. 2008)

Mary McGuckian (born 27 May 1963) is a film director, producer, actress, and screenwriter from Northern Ireland. Her work includes The Midnight Court, Words Upon the Window Pane (1994), This Is the Sea (1996), Best (1999), The Bridge of San Luis Rey (2001), Rag Tale (2004), Intervention (2007), Inconceivable (2008), Man on the Train (2010), The Price of Desire (2015), and A Girl from Mogadishu (2018).

== Early life ==
Mary McGuckian is the sister of Rosheen, and born to Alastair McGuckian, co-founder of the agribusiness giant Masstock Ventures in 1970, with his brother Paddy McGuckian, and Almarai in 1977, and raised on the 700-acre family farm, in Massereene, County Antrim, Northern Ireland.

McGuckian completed her drama education at Trinity College, Dublin (TCD). It was here where she became involved with writing, producing, acting, and directing.

== Career ==
She wrote a number of avant-garde plays such as the long-running stage adaptation of Brian Merriman's poem "The Midnight Court". She wrote and directed: Words Upon the Window Pane (1994), adapted from the play by W. B. Yeats), This Is the Sea (1996), an adaptation of her own play Hazel, and Best (1999), the life story of Northern Irish footballer George Best.

In 2001, she established Pembridge Pictures in the UK to develop and finance her adaptation of Thornton Wilder's The Bridge of San Luis Rey, a film which starred F. Murray Abraham, Robert de Niro, Gabriel Byrne and Harvey Keitel. This work based on the Pulitzer Prize winning novel was criticised by critics for being flat and poor adaption of the book, The New York Times critic described it as "dead literary meat" and said it was "Dragged down by a stuffy screenplay clotted with generic period oratory... and hopelessly muddled in its storytelling..." The work is considered a catastrophic box-office failure grossing less than $50,000 based on a budget of $54,000,000.

This lead her to work on more modern filmmaking styles and she developed a process combining modern script narrative forms and extended character development work with collaborating actors who then improvise their own dialogue directly on set, like in Rag Tale (2004), which starred Malcolm McDowell, Jennifer Jason Leigh, and Simon Callow. This was the first film of her "amorality trilogy", followed by Intervention, (2007) and Inconceivable (2008).

In 2010, she wrote and directed an English language version of Man on the Train, starring Larry Mullen Jr and Donald Sutherland, based on Patrice LeConte's L'Homme du Train originally starring Johnny Hallyday and Jean Rochefort.

later films have focussed on female equality stories and include: The Price of Desire (2015), which is the story of the inception of 20th-century architecture told in the context of how Le Corbusier completely erased the legacy of Irish Architect and Designer Eileen Gray. The cast included Irish actress Orla Brady as Eileen Gray, Swiss actor Vincent Perez as her nemesis Le Corbusier and Francesco Scianna as well as Alanis Morissette. The film premiered at the 2015 Jameson Dublin International Film Festival.

A Girl from Mogadishu (2019), which starred Aja Naomi King, Barkhad Abdi and Maryam Mursals in the story of Irish Somali activist, Ifrah Ahmed's journey from war-torn Somalia to global activist. It premiered at the 2019 Dublin International Film Festival and Edinburgh International Film Festival, and it won the Audience Award at the 42nd edition of the Mill Valley Film Festival. Other awards included the Audience and Jury awards at the Semaine de Cinema Britannique in France and the Cinema For Peace Foundation award for its contribution to Women's Empowerment during the 2020 Berlin Film Festival.

== Personal life ==
Before they separated in 2008, she was married to actor John Lynch.

== Filmography ==
=== Director ===
- 2022 - The Bridge of San Luis Rey Remastered
- 2018 - A Girl from Mogadishu
- 2014 - The Price of Desire
- 2011 - The Novelist
- 2011 - Man on the Train
- 2010 - The Making of Plus One
- 2008 - Inconceivable
- 2007 - Intervention
- 2005 - Rag Tale
- 2004 - The Bridge of San Luis Rey
- 2000 - Best
- 1997 - This Is the Sea
- 1994 - Words Upon the Window Pane

=== Screenwriter ===
- 2018 - A Girl from Mogadishu
- 2014 - The Price of Desire
- 2011 - The Novelist
- 2011 - Man on the Train
- 2010 - The Making of Plus One
- 2008 - Inconceivable
- 2007 - Intervention
- 2005 - Rag Tale
- 2004 - The Bridge of San Luis Rey
- 2000 - Best
- 1997 - This Is the Sea
- 1994 - Words Upon the Windowpane

=== Producer ===
- 2022 - The Bridge of San Luis Rey Remastered
- 2018 - A Girl from Mogadishu
- 2014 - The Price of Desire
- 2011 - The Novelist
- 2011 - Man on the Train
- 2010 - The Making of Plus One
- 2008 - Inconceivable
- 2007 - Intervention
- 2005 - Ragtale
- 2004 - The Bridge of San Luis Rey
- 2000 - Best
- 1997 - This Is the Sea
- 1994 - Words Upon the Windowpane
