= Jennifer Tilly =

American actress (born 1958)

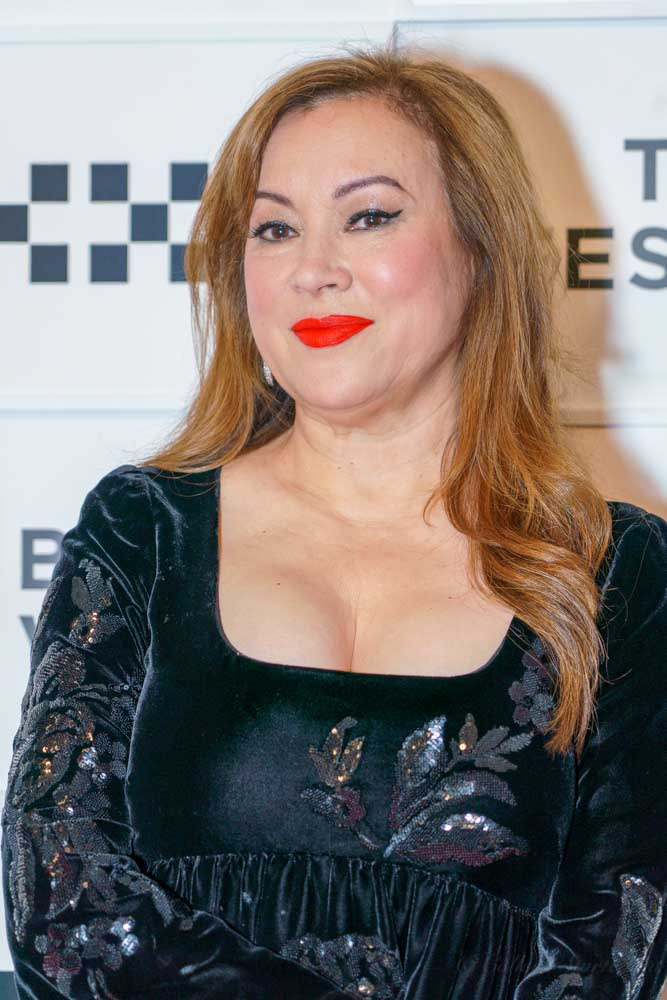
- Tilly in 2026
- Born: Jennifer Ellen Chan; September 16, 1958 (age 68); Los Angeles, California, U.S.
- Education: Stephens College
- Occupations: Actress; poker player
- Years active: 1983–present
- Spouse: Sam Simon (m. 1984; div. 1991)
- Partner: Phil Laak (2004–present)
- Relatives: Meg Tilly (sister); Rebecca Tilly (sister)

Jennifer Tilly (born Jennifer Ellen Chan; September 16, 1958) is an American actress and professional poker player. Known for her distinctive breathy voice and comedic timing, she began her career with small parts in film and television throughout the mid-late 1980s. Tilly achieved a career breakthrough with her portrayal of Olive Neal in Bullets Over Broadway (1994), for which she was nominated for the Academy Award for Best Supporting Actress.

She subsequently earned critical acclaim for her portrayal of Violet, a lesbian femme fatale, in Bound (1996). Tilly rose to widespread recognition when she played Tiffany Valentine in Bride of Chucky (1998), reprising the character in several more installments of the Child's Play film series, as well as the Syfy/USA show Chucky (2021–2024). Her association with the franchise has established her as a pop culture icon and scream queen. Since 1999, Tilly has voiced Bonnie Swanson on the Fox animated sitcom Family Guy.

Her other film credits include The Fabulous Baker Boys (1989), Made in America (1993), Liar Liar (1997), Music from Another Room (1998), Stuart Little (1999), The Cat's Meow (2001), Monsters, Inc. (2001), The Haunted Mansion (2003), Home on the Range (2004), and Tideland (2005). On stage, she appeared in the Broadway revivals of The Women (2001) and Don't Dress for Dinner (2012), and was the recipient of a Theatre World Award in 1993 for her performance in the off-Broadway play One Shoe Off.

Tilly is a World Series of Poker bracelet champion, becoming the first-ever celebrity to win such a tournament in 2005. She won the third World Poker Tour Ladies Invitational Tournament that same year, and was nominated for PokerListings' Spirit of Poker Living Legend Award in 2014. As of 2019, her live tournament winnings exceeded $1 million.

== Early life, family and education ==
Tilly was born Jennifer Ellen Chan on September 16, 1958, in Harbor City, Los Angeles, California, the second of four children born to Harry Chan, a used car salesman, and Patricia (née Tilly), a schoolteacher and former stage actress. Tilly's father was Chinese American, while her Canadian mother was of Irish, Finnish, and Native American ancestry. She has an older brother, Steve, and two younger sisters: actress and writer Meg, and Rebecca, an artist.

Following her parents' divorce when she was five years old, Tilly was raised by her mother and stepfather, John Ward, on rural Texada Island in her mother's native British Columbia. According to her sister Meg, Ward was a sadistic pedophile; although sister Rebecca agreed with this characterization, Jennifer did not comment on the issue. Her mother divorced again when Tilly was 16. The family then moved to Langford (a suburb of Victoria), where Tilly attended Belmont Secondary School and graduated from Esquimalt High School.

During her high school years, she developed an interest in theater, which prompted her to actively participate in plays as an extra with the assistance of her mother. She earned a bachelor's degree in theater from Stephens College in Missouri.

== Acting career ==
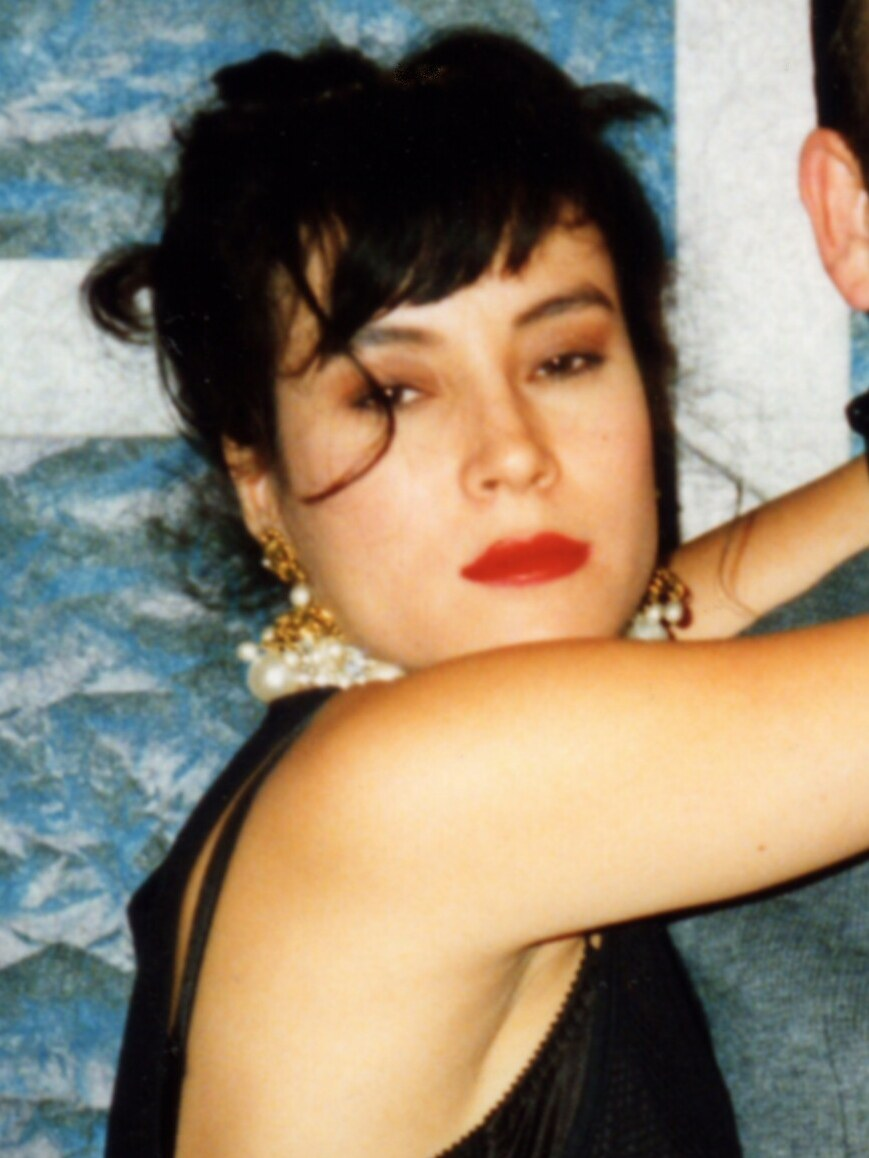
Tilly in 1991

In 1983, Tilly had small roles and had a recurring guest role on Hill Street Blues as Gina Srignoli, a mobster's widow who becomes romantically involved with detective Henry Goldblume. She played Frasier Crane's seductive-but-ditzy date Candi Pearson on an episode of the fourth season of Cheers and appeared as a similar character on the eleventh season of Frasier.

She appeared as Garry's girlfriend on It's Garry Shandling's Show, which was broadcast on Showtime. She was also cast as a high-end prostitute on the short-lived comedy Key West, alongside Fisher Stevens. In 1989, she had a prominent role in the comedy Let It Ride, starring Richard Dreyfuss. Tilly's breakthrough film role was as a waitress in The Fabulous Baker Boys, a role that was written specially for her by Steve Kloves. She was nominated for an Academy Award for Best Supporting Actress for her role as Olive Neal, a hopelessly bad actress in Woody Allen's 1994 comedy Bullets Over Broadway but she lost to her co-star Dianne Wiest. In 1994, she also had a small role in The Getaway with Alec Baldwin and Kim Basinger.

Tilly starred in Bound (1996), directed by the Wachowskis, which portrays a lesbian relationship her character has with alluring ex-con Corky, played by Gina Gershon. She played Samantha Cole in the Jim Carrey comedy Liar Liar (1997). In Dancing at the Blue Iguana (2000), she played a stripper and part-time dominatrix. She portrayed gossip columnist Louella Parsons in the Peter Bogdanovich historical drama The Cat's Meow (2001).

She gained additional popularity around that time for her portrayal of serial killer Tiffany Valentine in several of the Child's Play horror movie series. The character was first introduced in the fourth installment of the franchise, Bride of Chucky (1998), and subsequently appeared in Seed of Chucky (2004), Curse of Chucky (2013), Cult of Chucky (2017), and the television series Chucky (2021-2024). In Seed of Chucky and the second season of Chucky, she plays a dual role, providing the voice for Tiffany and also playing an exaggerated version of herself. The performance earned her nominations for the Fangoria Chainsaw Award for Best Actress and the MTV Movie Award for Best Scared-As-Shit Performance. She reprises the role in every subsequent appearance.

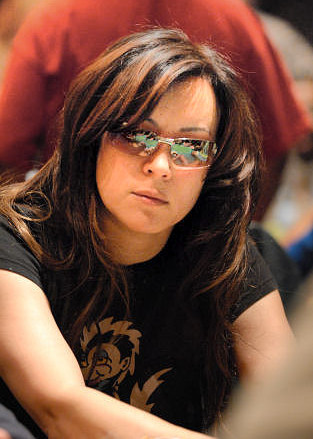
Tilly at the 2007 World Poker Tour

In 2001, she starred as Crystal Allen in the Broadway revival of The Women. In 2002 she played Fanny Minafer in the made-for-TV remake of Orson Welles' The Magnificent Ambersons.

She is a semi-regular cast member on Family Guy, voicing the Griffin family's neighbor, Bonnie Swanson. She has also done voice-over work for the films Monsters, Inc., Stuart Little and Home on the Range, as well as the children's series Hey Arnold! In Disney's The Haunted Mansion, she portrays Madame Leota (a head in a crystal ball). She has been active in the theatre, winning a Theater World Award for her performance in the off-Broadway play One Shoe Off.

She had a starring role on the sitcom Out of Practice, which starred Henry Winkler and Stockard Channing. The series was cancelled in May 2006. About this time, Tilly started dividing her time between her film career and professional poker. By the end of 2008, she returned to her film and television career. In 2009, Tilly made her Chinese film debut in the Christina Yao film Empire of Silver playing Mrs. Landdeck.

In 2012, she returned to Broadway in Don't Dress for Dinner, garnering an Audience Choice Award nomination for her portrayal of mistress Suzanne. In 2013, she starred in the Wallace Shawn/Andre Gregory collaboration Grasses of a Thousand Colors which premiered at the Royal Court Theatre in London in 2009 and then moved to the Joseph Papp Theater in 2013. She regularly appeared in the comedy revue Celebrity Autobiography.

In 2024, it was announced that Tilly would be appearing on The Real Housewives of Beverly Hills, as a friend of the housewives, for the fourteenth season.

== Poker career ==
Jennifer Tilly
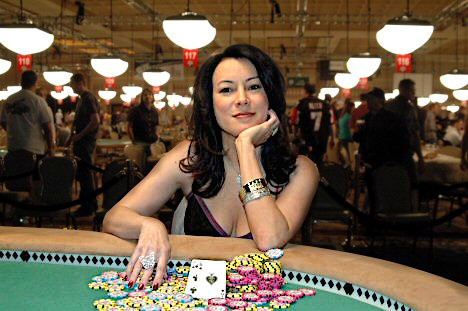
- Tilly after her win at the 2005 World Series of Poker $1,000 Ladies Only Event – No Limit Hold'em
- Nicknames: The Unabombshell, J Tilla the Killa

World Series of Poker
- Bracelet: 1
- Money finishes: 20
- Highest WSOP Main Event finish: None

World Poker Tour
- Title: None
- Final table: None
- Money finishes: 6

Tilly's father was a gambler and a poker player, and gave her the video game World Series of Poker. She was subsequently taught the real game by her boyfriend when she moved to Hollywood.

On June 27, 2005, Tilly won a World Series of Poker bracelet (and $158,625) in the Ladies' No-Limit Texas hold 'em event, beating 600 other players. She followed up this accomplishment on September 1, 2005, by winning the third World Poker Tour Ladies Invitational Tournament held at the Bicycle Casino in Bell Gardens, a suburb of Los Angeles. Tilly has appeared in the GSN Poker Royale series. Tilly played in the Celebrity Poker Showdown which aired June 14, 2006, on Bravo. She came in third place after being beaten by Bravo's online poker champion Ida Siconolfi. She also participated in the Poker After Dark show.

When playing poker on television, Tilly often wears low-cut tops with push-up bras that expose considerable cleavage in order to "look cute", but noted that "if people are really playing poker, they don't care. Nothing looks better to them than a pair of aces. They're not looking at your pair. They're looking at their pair." Tilly appears in the Activision’s World Series of Poker Tournament of Champions 2007 Edition video game, along with her boyfriend Phil Laak.

In a television interview in 2005, Tilly stated that at that point in her career she was more interested in pursuing poker than acting. By December 2008, Tilly announced her retirement from poker as a career. In her monthly column in Bluff Magazine, she said: "I love poker but greatness in poker is an elusive dream. There are too many variants. Trying to find validation in poker is like trying to find a virgin in a whorehouse. I'm not giving up poker entirely – gambling is an addiction after all. I'm just going to treat it more like a hobby and less like a career."

In January 2010, she resumed her poker career. She was nominated for PokerListings' Spirit of Poker Living Legend Award in 2014, and as of July 2019, her live tournament winnings exceeded $1 million.

== Personal life ==
Tilly was married to Sam Simon, developer and producer of The Simpsons, from 1984 until 1991. As of 2018, Tilly receives 30 percent of net proceeds that Simon's estate receives from the show, an arrangement she credits with allowing her to be choosier about her roles. She has been in a relationship with professional poker player Phil Laak since 2004.

== Filmography ==
=== Film ===
Year	Title	Role	Notes
1984	No Small Affair	Mona	
1985	Moving Violations	Amy Hopkins	
1986	Inside Out	Amy	
1987	He's My Girl	Lisa	
1988	Remote Control	Allegra James	
1988	Johnny Be Good	Connie Hisler	
1988	Rented Lips	Mona Lisa	
1988	High Spirits	Miranda	
1989	Far from Home	Amy	
1989	Let It Ride	Vicki	
1989	The Fabulous Baker Boys	Blanche "Monica" Moran	
1991	The Doors	Okie Girl	Uncredited. Deleted Scenes.
1991	Scorchers	Talbot	
1992	Shadow of the Wolf	Igiyook	
1993	Made in America	Stacy	
1994	The Getaway	Fran Carvey	
1994	Double Cross	Melissa	
1994	Bullets Over Broadway	Olive Neal	
1995	Embrace of the Vampire	Marika	
1995	Bird of Prey	Kily Griffith	
1995	Man with a Gun	Rena Rushton / Kathy Payne	
1996	Edie & Pen	Edie Piper	
1996	The Pompatus of Love	Tarzaan	
1996	Bound	Violet	
1996	American Strays	Patty Mae	
1996	House Arrest	Cindy Figler	
1997	Liar Liar	Samantha Cole	
1997	The Wrong Guy	Lynn Holden	
1998	Music from Another Room	Nina	
1998	Relax...It's Just Sex	Tara Ricotto	
1998	Hoods	Mary Crippa	
1998	Bride of Chucky	Tiffany Valentine	
1999	The Muse	Herself	
1999	Bartok the Magnificent	Piloff (voice)	Direct-to-video
1999	Goosed	Charlene	
1999	Do Not Disturb	Cathryn	
1999	Stuart Little	Mrs. Camille Stout (voice)	
1999	Play It to the Bone	Ringside Fan	
2000	Cord (also released as Hide and Seek)	Helen	
2000	Bruno	Dolores	
2000	The Crew	Ferris "Maureen" Lowenstein	
2000	Dancing at the Blue Iguana	Jo	
2001	Dirt	Hooker	
2001	Fast Sofa	Ginger Quail	
2001	The Cat's Meow	Louella Parsons	
2001	Ball in the House	Dot	
2001	Monsters, Inc.	Celia Mae (voice)	
2003	Hollywood North	Gillian Stevens	
2003	Jericho Mansions	Donna Cherry	
2003	The Haunted Mansion	Madame Leota	
2003	Happy End	Edna	
2004	Second Best	Carole	
2004	Perfect Opposites	Elyse Steinberg	
2004	Home on the Range	Grace (voice)	
2004	El Padrino	Sebeva	
2004	Saint Ralph	Nurse Alice	
2004	Love on the Side	Alma Kerns	
2004	Seed of Chucky	Tiffany Valentine (voice) / Herself	
2005	Lil' Pimp	Miss De La Croix (voice)	Direct-to-video
2005	The Civilization of Maxwell Bright	Dr. O'Shannon	
2005	Bailey's Billion$	Dolores Pennington	
2005	Tideland	Queen Gunhilda	
2006	The Poker Movie	Herself	
2007	Intervention	Jane	
2008	Deal	Karen "Razor" Jones	
2008	The Caretaker	Miss Perry	
2008	Bart Got a Room	Melinda	
2008	Inconceivable	Salome "Sally" Marsh	
2009	An American Girl: Chrissa Stands Strong	Mrs. Rundell	
2009	Empire of Silver	Mrs. Landdeck	
2009	Made in Romania	Herself	
2010	The Making of Plus One	Amber	
2012	30 Beats	Erika	
2013	Amelia's 25th	Miss Celie	
2013	Curse of Chucky	Tiffany Valentine	Cameo, direct-to-video
2013	Return to Babylon	Clara Bow	
2013	The Secret Lives of Dorks	Ms. Stewart	
2015	Unity	Herself	Documentary
2015	Rebel With a Cause, the Sam Simon Story	Herself	Documentary
2016	A Cinderella Story: If the Shoe Fits	Divine	Direct-to-video
2017	Cult of Chucky	Tiffany Valentine	Direct-to-video
2017	Ray Meets Helen	Ginger	
2019	7 Days to Vegas	Jennifer	
2020	Poker Queens	Herself	Documentary
2021	High Holiday	Stephanie Cooksey	
2022	Living With Chucky	Herself	Documentary
2024	Sallywood	Joann	
2026	A Dog's Perfect Christmas	Lucille	

=== Television ===
Year	Title	Role	Notes
1983	Oh Madeline	Laurie	Episode: "Madeline Acts Forward at the Retreat"
1983	Boone	Sonia	Episode: "Words and Music"
1984	Shaping Up	Shannon Winters	4 episodes
1984–1985	Hill Street Blues	Gina Srignoli	6 episodes
1985	Remington Steele	Eva Wilson / Blitzen	Episode: "Dancer, Prancer, Donner and Steele"
1986	Stir Crazy	Karen	Episode: "Basic Straining"
1986	Cheers	Candi Pearson	Episode: "Second Time Around"
1987	It's Garry Shandling's Show	Angelica	Episodes: "It's Garry and Angelica's Show: Part 1 & 2"
1989	Moonlighting	Nurse Saundra	Episode: "Plastic Fantastic Lovers"
1992	Dream On	Ryan	Episode: "What Women Want"
1993	At Home with the Webbers	Miranda Webber	Television film
1993	Key West	Savannah Sumner	13 episodes
1994	Heads	Tina Abbot	Television film
1997	Gun	Phyllis	Episode: "All the President's Women"
1997	Bella Mafia	Moyra Luciano	Television film
1999–present	Family Guy	Bonnie Swanson (voice)	Recurring role
2000	Hey Arnold!	Lola (voice)	Episode: "Suspended/Ernie in Love"
2000–2003	Scruff	Tricks (voice)	Main role
2001	Sister Mary Explains It All	Philomena Rostovich	Television film
2001	The Kid	Waitress (voice)	Television film
2002	The Magnificent Ambersons	Fanny Minafer	Television film
2002	Stage on Screen: The Women	Crystal Allen	Television film
2004	Frasier	Kim	Episode: "Miss Right Now"
2005–2006	Out of Practice	Crystal	14 episodes
2006	The Initiation of Sarah	Dr. Eugenia Hunter	Television film
2009	The Cleveland Show	Bonnie Swanson (voice)	Pilot episode
2010	CSI: Crime Scene Investigation	Terpsie Pratt	Episode: "Take My Life, Please!"
2011	Drop Dead Diva	Ginny	Episode: "Dream Big"
2011, 2014	Modern Family	Darlene	2 episodes
2012	RuPaul's Drag Race	Herself – Guest Judge	Episode: "Frenemies"
2012	The Simpsons	Herself (voice)	Episode: "Gone Abie Gone"
2013, 2014	Randy Cunningham: 9th Grade Ninja	Amanda Levay / The Sorceress (voice)	2 episodes
2015	Spun Out	Maggie Felgate	Episode: "The Secret of My Ex-Wife's Success"
2018	SuperMansion	Marjorie (voice)	Episode: "A Prayer for Mister T: A SuperMansion Thanksgiving Special"
2020	JJ Villard's Fairy Tales	Little Red Riding Hood (voice)	Episode: "Little Red Riding Hood"
2020, 2022–present	The Real Housewives of Beverly Hills	Herself	Episode: "To Live and Text in Beverly Hills", "Secrets Revealed", "The Crystal Conundrum", "The Eaglewoman Has Landed", & "Sutton-ly Suspicious"; Guest: Seasons 10, 12 & 13, Recurring: Season 14–
2021	Calls	Mother (voice)	Episode: "The Beginning"
2021	Monsters at Work	Celia Mae (voice)	Main role: Season 1 only
2021–2024	Chucky	Tiffany Valentine / Herself (voice)	Recurring role
2022	Bee and PuppyCat: Lazy In Space	Violet (voice)	Guest
2022	Queer for Fear: The History of Queer Horror	Herself	Docuseries
2023	SpongeBob SquarePants	Petunia (voice)	Episode: "The Flower Plot"
2024	The Boulet Brothers' Dragula	Herself – Guest Judge	Episode: "Killer Dolls"
2025	Denise Richards & Her Wild Things	Herself	Episode: "The Family that Photoshoots Together…"
2026	School Spirits	Dr. Deborah Hunter-Price	Recurring role
2026	The Real Housewives of New York City	Herself	Episode: "Gloves Off at the Gala"

=== Stage ===
Year	Title	Role	Notes
1993	One Shoe Off	Clio	The Public Theater
2001	The Women	Crystal Allen	Roundabout
2012	Don't Dress for Dinner	Suzanne	Roundabout
2013	Grasses of a Thousand Colors	Robin	Public Theater
2026	The Adding Machine	Mrs. Zero	New Group

=== Web ===
Year	Title	Role	Notes
2017	Kevin Pollak's Chat Show	Herself/Guest	Episode: "335"

=== Video games ===
Year	Title	Voice role	Note
2014	Family Guy: The Quest for Stuff	Bonnie Swanson	
2023	Dead by Daylight	The Good Gal (Tiffany Valentine)	DLC

== Awards and nominations ==
Year	Awards	Category	Nominated work	Result	Ref.
—N/a	Drama-Logue Award	Best Actress	Vanities	Won	
—N/a	Drama-Logue Award	—N/a	One Shoe Off	Won	
1989	CableACE Award	Best Actress in a Comedy Series	It's Garry Shandling's Show	Nominated	
1993	Theatre World Award	Outstanding Newcomer	One Shoe Off	Won	
1994	Awards Circuit Community Award	Best Cast Ensemble (shared with the cast)	Bullets Over Broadway	Nominated	
1995	Academy Award	Best Supporting Actress	Bullets Over Broadway	Nominated	
1995	American Comedy Award	Funniest Supporting Actress in a Motion Picture	Bullets Over Broadway	Nominated	
1995	Gemini Award	Best Performance by an Actress in a Leading Role in a Dramatic Program or Mini-series	Heads	Nominated	
1997	Saturn Award	Best Supporting Actress	Bound	Nominated	
1997	Fantasporto Film Festival	Best Actress	Bound	Won	
1997	MTV Movie Award	Best Kiss (shared with Gina Gershon)	Bound	Nominated	
1998	Blockbuster Entertainment Award	Favorite Supporting Actress – Comedy	Liar Liar	Nominated	
1998	Eyegore Awards	Best Actress	Herself	Won	
1999	Saturn Award	Best Actress	Bride of Chucky	Nominated	
2000	Fantafestival	Best Actress	Bride of Chucky	Won	
2001	DVD Exclusive Award	Best Actress in a DVD Premiere Movie	Ball in the House	Won	
2004	Fangoria Chainsaw Award	Best Actress	Seed of Chucky	3rd place	
2004	MTV Movie Award	Best Frightened Performance	Seed of Chucky	Nominated	
2006	GLAAD Media Award	Golden Gate Award	Herself	Honored	
2006	Asheville Film Festival	Career Achievement Award	Herself	Honored	
2007	San Diego Film Festival	Best Actress	Intervention	Won	
2008	Florida Film Festival	Artistic Achievement	Herself	Honored	
2010	TheWIFTS Foundation International Visionary Award	Barbara Tipple Award for Best Actress	Intervention and Inconceivable	Won	
2015	Behind the Voice Actors Award	Best Female Vocal Performance in a Television Series in a Guest Role – Action/Drama	Randy Cunningham: 9th Grade Ninja	Nominated	
2021	Garden State Film Festival	Best Ensemble (Feature) (shared with the cast)	7 Days to Vegas	Won	
2022	Saturn Award	Best Guest-Starring Performance: Network / Cable Series	Chucky	Won	
2025	Project Angel Food	Angel Award	Herself	Honored	

=== Poker awards ===
- World Series of Poker Bracelet: In 2005, Tilly won the $1,000 Ladies' No Limit Hold'em; the prize was $158,335.
- CardPlayer Best Celebrity Player of the Year, 2005
- WPT Ladies Invitational Tournament, 2005 ($25,000)
- WPT Bellagio Cup 5K, 2010 ($124,455)
- Women in Poker Hall of Fame Inductee, 2022
