= Best (film) =

2000 film by Mary McGuckian

- Directed by: Mary McGuckian
- Written by: John Lynch; Mary McGuckian
- Produced by: Elvira Bolz; Mary McGuckian; Chris Roff
- Starring: John Lynch
- Distributed by: Optimum Releasing
- Release dates: 1 May 2000 (premiere); 12 May 2000 (general release)
- Running time: 102 minutes
- Country: United Kingdom
- Language: English

Best is a 2000 British film portraying the football career of the Northern Irish football star George Best, particularly his years spent at Manchester United. It was directed by Mary McGuckian.

== Cast ==
- John Lynch as George Best
- Ian Bannen as Sir Matt Busby
- Jerome Flynn as Bobby Charlton
- Ian Hart as Nobby Stiles
- Patsy Kensit as Angie Best
- Cal Macaninch as Paddy
- Linus Roache as Denis Law
- Adrian Lester as Rocky
- David Hayman as Tommy Docherty, The Barman
- Philip Madoc as Jimmy Murphy
- Jim Sheridan as Bob Bishop
- James Ellis as Dickie Beal
- Roger Daltrey as Rodney Marsh
- Clive Anderson as Interviewer
- Sophie Dahl as Eva Haraldsted
- Stephen Fry as Frazer Crane
- Dave Duffy as Limousine Driver
- Neil Caple as The Barber
- Nick Wall as Photographer
- John McCarthy as Hairdresser
- Nick Woolham as #1 Boy Autograph Hunter

== Filming locations ==
- Isle of Man
- Liverpool, Merseyside, England
- Saints RLFC, Knowsley Road, St Helens, Merseyside, England

== Release dates ==
- UK - 1 May 2000 (Belfast Premiere)
- UK - 12 May 2000 (General Release)
- Israel - 1 June 2000
- USA - 15 September 2000 (Temecula Valley International Film Festival)
- Iceland - 28 March 2001 (Video Premiere)
- Singapore - 26 July 2001
- Italy - 10 May 2002
- Netherlands - 6 April 2004 (DVD Premiere)

== Reception ==
Ian Nathan of Empire gave it two out of five.

Angie Best said of the film: "I haven't been consulted at all, even though it shows my life." In response, in 2002, Angie Best wrote her autobiography George and Me: My Autobiography

== Awards ==
=== Ft. Lauderdale International Film Festival ===
Best Actor - John Lynch (tied with Dirk Roofthooft and Pleure pas Germaine)

=== Temecula Valley International Film Festival ===
Best Foreign Film - Mary McGuckain
