= Inconceivable (2008 film) =

- Promotional poster
- Directed by: Mary McGuckian
- Written by: Mary McGuckian
- Produced by: Mary McGuckian; Jeff Abberley; Martin Katz
- Starring: Jennifer Tilly; Andie MacDowell; Geraldine Chaplin; Elizabeth McGovern; Colm Feore; Kerry Fox; Amanda Plummer
- Cinematography: Mark Wolf
- Edited by: David Freemantle; Ted Seaborn
- Music by: Kevin Banks
- Release date: 18 June 2008 (Taormina Film Festival)
- Running time: 105 minutes
- Countries: Canada; United Kingdom
- Language: English

Inconceivable is a 2008 Canadian-British satirical drama film about the test-tube baby industry. The film was written and directed by Mary McGuckian.

== Plot ==
Dr. Freeman (Feore) runs a Las Vegas Assisted Reproductive Technology clinic. Eight of the nine women are inseminated and become pregnant, except Salome (Tilly) who manages to conceive naturally.

After the births, investigative journalist Tallulah (McGovern) notices a striking resemblance between the toddlers. She comes to believe that Dr. Freeman swapped donor sperm for his own. A preliminary hearing is held and the process of the nine women is recalled.

== Cast ==
- Jennifer Tilly as Salome "Sally" Marsh
- Andie MacDowell as Charlotte Louise "Lottie" Du Bose
- Geraldine Chaplin as Frances Church-Chappel
- Elizabeth McGovern as Lesley Banks
- Colm Feore as Dr. Jackson Charles "Jack" Freeman
- Kerry Fox as Kay Stephenson
- Amanda Plummer as Tallulah "Tutu" Williams
- Michael Eklund as Marlon Bell
- John Sessions as Finbar Darrow
- Jordi Mollà as Victor, The Clinical Coordinator
- David Sutcliffe as John Du Bose
- Lothaire Bluteau as Malcolm Blay
- David Alpay as Mark Henderson
- Donna D'Errico as Elsa Roxanne Gold
- Oona Chaplin as Laura Chappel
- Owen Teale as Richard Newman
- Nicholas Campbell as Jonathan Banks
- Greta Scacchi (uncredited)
