= Intervention (2007 film) =

- Directed by: Mary McGuckian
- Starring: Donna D'Errico; Charles Dance; Colm Feore
- Release date: 8 August 2007 (RIIFF)
- Running time: 1h 33min
- Country: United Kingdom
- Language: English

Intervention is a 2007 British drama film directed by Mary McGuckian. It won the Best Feature Film award at the 2007 San Diego Film Festival.

The film only played in one theater and made a total of $279 at the box office during its entire theatrical run.

== Cast ==
- Donna D'Errico as Pamela
- Charles Dance as Private Investigator
- Gary Farmer as Bob
- Colm Feore as Bill
- Kerry Fox as Kate
- Jenny Gabrielle as Olivia
- Rupert Graves as Mark
- Ian Hart as Harry III Jr
- Andie MacDowell as Kelly
- Jennifer Tilly as Jane
