= E.1027: Eileen Gray and the House by the Sea =

Documentary on Eileen Gray

- Directed by: Beatrice Minger; Christoph Schaub
- Written by: Beatrice Minger
- Produced by: Philip Delaquis; Frank Matter
- Cinematography: Ramon Giger
- Edited by: Gion-Reto Killias
- Music by: Peter Scherer
- Release date: March 2024
- Running time: 90 minutes
- Country: Switzerland
- Language: English

E.1027: Eileen Gray and the House by the Sea (German: E.1027 – Eileen Gray und das Haus am Meer) is a 2024 Swiss docufiction film directed by Beatrice Minger and Christoph Schaub. It explores the legacy of architect Eileen Gray and her house E.1027 on the French Riviera. The film was nominated for four awards at the 2025 Swiss Film Awards and was screened at festivals including Zurich, Solothurn, Dublin, Montreal, and Munich.

== Synopsis ==
Irish designer Eileen Gray builds a modernist house on the Côte d’Azur in 1929 with Jean Badovici and names it E.1027. After Le Corbusier becomes fascinated by the house, he paints murals on its walls and later builds his Cabanon behind it, despite Gray’s objections, helping define the site’s later history.

== Cast ==
The cast includes:

- Natalie Radmall-Quirke as Eileen Gray
- Axel Moustache as Jean Badovici
- Charles Morillon as Le Corbusier
- Vera Flück as Louise

== Production ==
The film combines archival footage with recreated scenes. It was shot partly at E.1027 itself and partly in a studio, and CGI was used in scenes set in the 1920s to remove Le Corbusier’s murals. The recreated scenes used stage-like set design, while filming at E.1027 itself was constrained by the site’s protected status.

== Reception ==
=== Awards and nominations ===
At the 2024 Zurich Film Festival, the film won a Special Mention for the ZFF Critics’ Award. It also won the 2024 Zürcher Filmpreis for Best Direction in the documentary category. At the 2025 Swiss Film Awards, it was nominated for Best Documentary Film, Best Film Score, Best Cinematography, and Best Film Editing.

=== Critical response ===
Katie McCabe of Sight and Sound wrote, "[T]his stylish film zips all too quickly through the life of Eileen Gray and her famous conflict with Le Corbusier, but shows great respect for the Irish architect's creative vision."

Fiona Rae of Film Threat gave the film a score of 8 out of 10 and wrote that it "is slow-paced but aesthetically beautiful and a great summer watch."

SRF described the film as a docufiction, praised Ramon Giger’s camerawork for capturing the house and its surroundings, and called it a beautiful but sad film.

In Tages-Anzeiger, the film was described as dark and illuminating, at times close to the artificial, but mostly strikingly beautiful.

== Festival screenings ==
The film premiered in March 2024. Later festival screenings in 2024 included DOK.fest München, the Zurich Film Festival, and the Seville European Film Festival. In 2025, it was also screened at the Solothurn Film Festival, the Dublin International Film Festival, and the Montreal International Festival of Films on Art.
