= Tim Benton =

British art historian

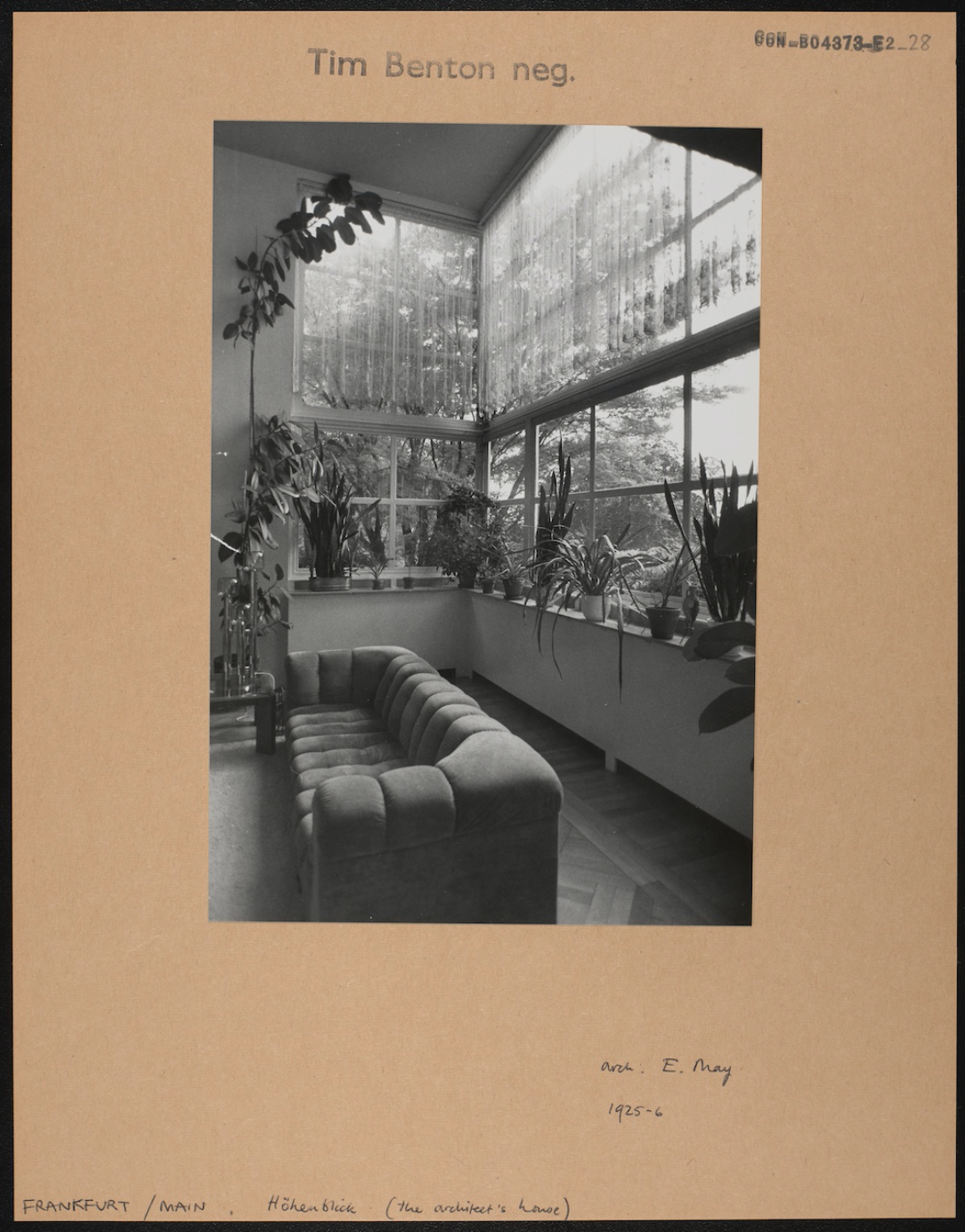
Architect’s House (designed by Ernst May). Photograph by Tim Benton. CON_B04373_F002_028. The Courtauld Institute of Art. CC-BY-4.0.

Tim Benton (born 21 June 1945, Rome) is Professor Emeritus in the History of Art at the Open University in the UK as well as a writer and broadcaster. He has also taught at Columbia University, Williams College, and École Polytechnique Fédérale de Lausanne. He has written extensively on the modernist architect Le Corbusier. A large collection of photographs by Tim Benton is held in the Courtauld Institute of Art's Conway Library archive, which is currently undergoing a digitisation project.

== Education ==
Tim Benton was educated at the University of Cambridge and the Courtauld Institute of Art, London.

== Professional memberships ==
Benton is a member of the Association for the preservation of "E-1027" designed by Eileen Gray with murals added by Le Corbusier. The site includes Le Corbusier's holiday home ("Cabanon de vacances") and the Etoile de Mer restaurant, in Roquebrune-Cap-Martin, France.

== Bibliography ==
His writings include:

- Benton, Tim. Le Corbusier conférencier, Editions Le Moniteur, 2007. This book won the 2008 Prix National du Livre awarded by the Académie d'Architecture in France.
- Benton, Tim. The Villas of Le Corbusier and Pierre Jeanneret 1920-1930, Birkhäuser and Editions de La Villette, 2007
- Benton, Tim. The Modernist Home, V&A Publications, 2006
- Benton, Tim. Le Corbusier: La Villa La Roche
- Benton, Tim. Villa Savoye and the Architect's Practice
- Benton, Tim. From the Arengario to the Lictor's Axe: Memories of Italian Fascism
- Benton, Tim. Humanism and Fascism
- Benton, Tim. The little "maison de weekend" and the Parisian suburbs
- Benton, Tim. From Jeanneret to Le Corbusier: Rusting Iron, bricks and coal and the modern Utopia
- Benton, Tim. Pessac and Lège revisited: standards, dimensions and failures
- Benton, Tim. Charlotte Perriand: Les années Le Corbusier
- Benton, Tim. Representing Modernism

== Exhibitions and exhibition catalogues ==
- Benton, Tim. Thirties: British Art and Design Before the War. (co-curator)
- Benton, Tim. Le Corbusier: Architect of the Century. (co-curator)
- Benton, Tim. Le Corbusier.: La Ricerca Paziente. (co-curator)
- Benton, Tim. Le Corbusier et la Mediterrannée. (co-curator)
- Benton, Tim. Art and Power: Europe Under the Dictators 1930–1945. (co-curator)
- Benton, Tim. Art Deco (co-curator and co-editor of the catalogue) and Modernism: Designing a New World.
