= 1924 in architecture =

The year 1924 in architecture involved some significant architectural events and new buildings.

== Events ==
- May – Royal Fine Art Commission appointed to advise the government of the United Kingdom on matters concerning the built environment.
- Eileen Gray and Jean Badovici begin work on their vacation home E-1027 at Roquebrune-Cap-Martin in the south of France

== Buildings and structures ==
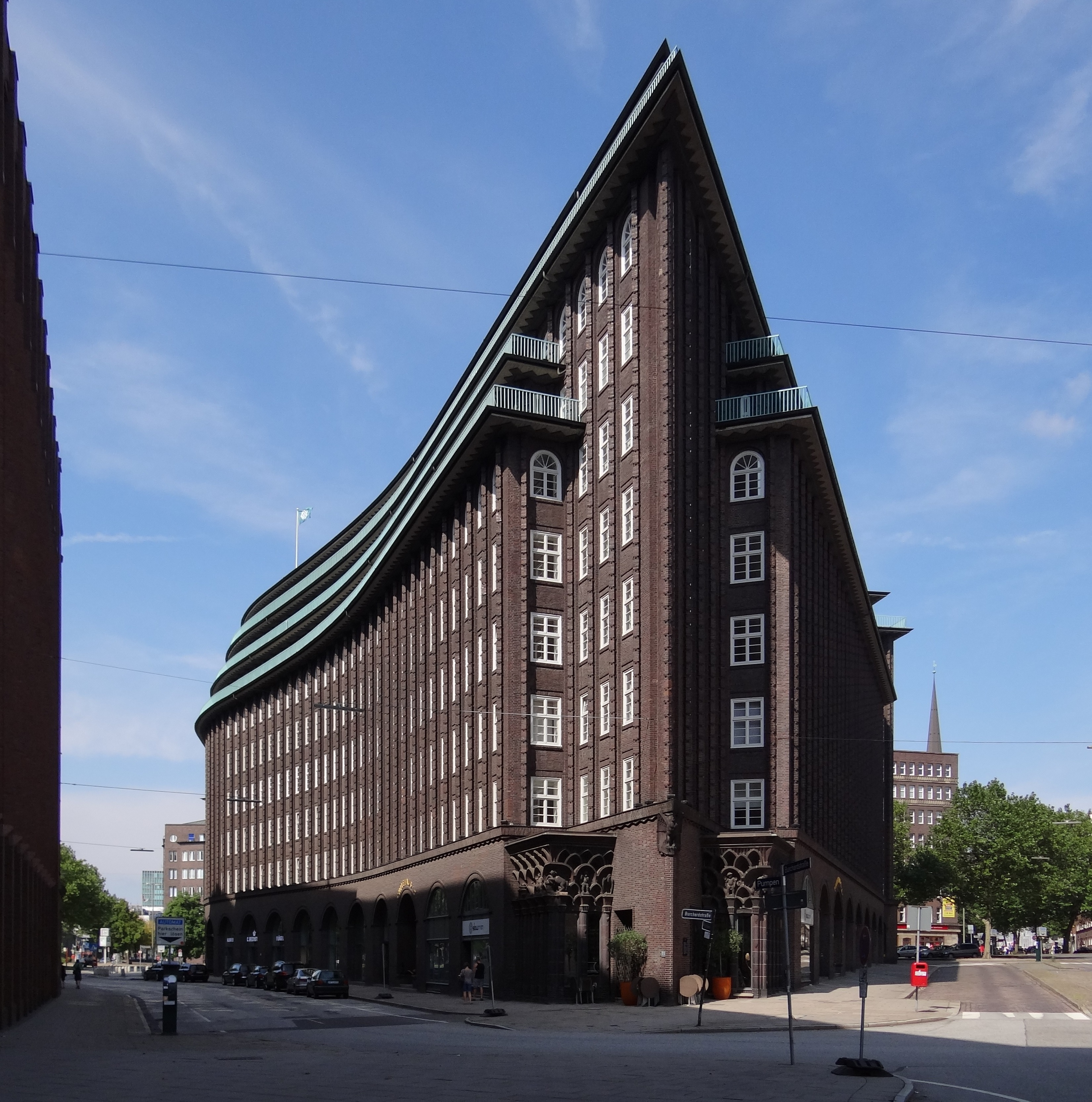
Chilehaus in Hamburg, Germany

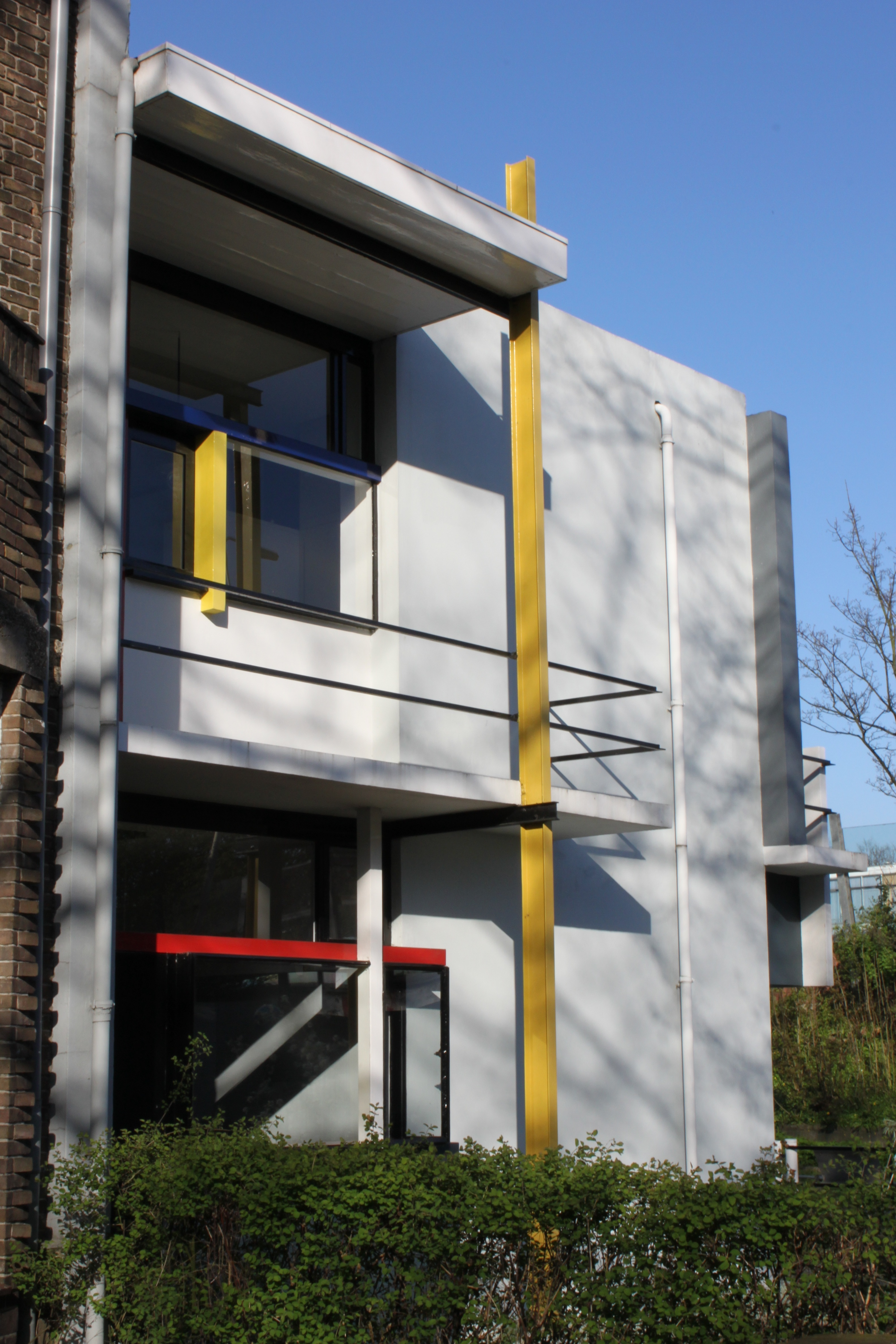
Rietveld Schröder House in Utrecht, Netherlands

=== Buildings completed ===
- The Chilehaus in Hamburg, Germany, designed by Johann Friedrich Höger.
- Rietveld Schröder House in Utrecht, Netherlands, designed by Gerrit Rietveld.
- Copenhagen Police Headquarters in Denmark, designed by Hack Kampmann (died 1920).
- Midland Bank headquarters in the City of London, designed by Sir Edwin Lutyens.
- Federal Reserve Bank of New York Building on Manhattan, designed by York and Sawyer.
- American Radiator Building on Manhattan, designed by John Mead Howells, Raymond Hood and J. André Fouilhoux.
- Queen Mary's Dolls' House in England, designed by Sir Edwin Lutyens.
- Church Rate Corner (private house) in Cambridge, England designed by Baillie Scott.

== Awards ==
- Olympic silver medal – Alfréd Hajós & Dezso Lauber of Hungary for Plan for Budapest Swimming Stadium.
- Olympic bronze medal – Julien Médecin of Monaco for Stadium for Monte Carlo (no gold medal was awarded).
- Grand Prix de Rome, architecture: Marcel Péchin.

== Births ==
- February 29 – Agustín Hernández Navarro, Mexican architect and sculptor (died 2022)
- March 23 – John Madin, English architect (died 2012)
- June 14 – Arthur Erickson, Canadian architect (died 2009)
- August 14 – Sverre Fehn, award-winning Norwegian architect (died 2009)
- August 16 – Philip Dowson, South African-born British architect (died 2014)
- December 4 – John C. Portman Jr., American architect and developer (died 2017)

== Deaths ==
- April 14 – Louis Sullivan, American architect sometimes called the "father of skyscrapers" and "father of modernism" (born 1856)
- April 23 – Bertram Goodhue, American neo-gothic architect (born 1869)
- April 24 – Ferdinand Arnodin, French bridge engineer (born 1845)
- August 11 – Franz Heinrich Schwechten, German architect (born 1841)
- November 7 – Sir Thomas Graham Jackson, English architect active in Oxford (born 1835)
