= L'Architecture Vivante =

- Editor-in-chief: Jean Badovici
- Categories: Architecture magazine
- Frequency: Quarterly
- First issue: 1923
- Final issue: 1934
- Company: Albert Morancé
- Country: France
- Based in: Paris
- Language: French

L'Architecture Vivante was a French language quarterly magazine for avant-garde architecture published in France from 1923 to 1932.

== History and profile ==
L’Architecture Vivante was published quarterly between 1923 and 1932. Jean Badovici, a Romanian architecture and critic, edited the magazine for two years from 1923 to 1925. He was an influential critic and mentor in France of international modern architecture, and he convinced the publisher, Albert Morancé, of the need for such a magazine.

L’Architecture Vivante devoted to modern architecture and design. The quarterly immediately became an influential advocate of the International style (Bauhaus, Constructivism, De Stijl).

Badovici's friend Le Corbusier, for instance, became one of the architects whose ideals were frequently discussed in the magazine. Badovici cultivated relations with other European avant-garde magazines such as Wendingen (Netherlands) and Cahiers d'Art (France), founded in 1926 by his friend Christian Zervos.

Each issue of L’Architecture Vivante routinely presented a number of architects and their works, but a few issues were devoted to a single designer (Le Corbusier, Pierre Jeanneret and, in 1929, Eileen Gray and her home E-1027).

== Reeditions L’Architecture Vivante ==
The issue concerning Eileen Gray / E.1027:

- Eileen Gray, Jean Badovici: E. 1027: Maison en bord de mer. In L’Architecture Vivante. Reedition Éd. Imbernon, Marseille 2006, ISBN 2-9516396-5-1.

The complete edition:

- L'Architecture vivante, Da Capo Press, New York, c 1975

== L’Architecture Vivante in libraries ==
In the United States (excerpts):

- New York Public Library (each of the issues from 1923 - 1933 seems to be available)
- Library of Congress (some issues available and complete reprint edition (New York, 1975) available)
- Chicago Public Library (complete reprint edition (New York, 1975) available)
- San Francisco Public Library (complete reprint edition (New York, 1975) available)

In Europe (excerpts):

- British Architectural Library, London (complete original and facsimile reprint editions available)
- Courtauld Institute, London (complete reprint edition (New York, 1975) available)
- Bayerische Staatsbibliothek, München (roundabout 9 issues)
- Bibliothèque nationale de France, Paris (some issues)
- Zentralinstitut für Kunstgeschichte, München (complete edition available)
