= Adjustable Table E 1027 =

Adjustable steel and glass table by Eileen Gray

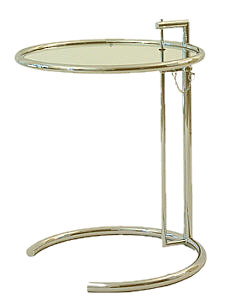
- Designer: Eileen Gray
- Date: 1927
- Materials: Stainless steel, tempered glass
- Style / tradition: Modernist
- Height: 54 cm (21 in) – 93 cm (37 in)

Table E 1027 is an adjustable steel and glass table designed by Irish designer Eileen Gray in 1927. Created for her E-1027 house, the table has since become one of Gray's most famous designs.

The table's adjustable arm and lightweight make it flexible in function. It has been suggested that Gray originally designed the table for her sister, who ate breakfast in bed; by holding a dining tray above the bed, rather than directly on the bed, the spill of crumbs could be avoided.

Before her death, Eileen Gray sold the design to British furniture manufacturer Zeev Aram.
