= Happy New Year (2008 film) =

2008 film

- Directed by: Christoph Schaub
- Written by: Grischa Duncker; Thomas Hess
- Produced by: Marcel Hoehn
- Starring: Nils Althaus
- Cinematography: Stéphane Kuthy
- Edited by: Marina Wernli
- Music by: Balz Bachmann; Peter Bräker
- Production companies: T&C Film
- Release date: October 2008
- Running time: 94 minutes
- Country: Switzerland
- Language: German

Happy New Year is a 2008 Swiss drama film directed by Christoph Schaub and written by Grischa Duncker and Thomas Hess. Set on New Year’s Eve, it follows several intersecting stories centred on a group of characters over the course of one night. The film was nominated for four prizes at the 2009 Swiss Film Prize and was screened at festivals including Moscow, Solothurn, Locarno, and Molodist.

== Synopsis ==
On New Year’s Eve in Zurich, a series of incidents, including a night-time taxi ride, a lost dog, a police late shift, and an urgent babysitting problem, give nine people a chance to change their lives. Among them are Gloria, who meets the taxi driver Kaspar after fearing she will spend the evening alone; the retired couple Herbert and Anne-Marie, whose marriage is thrown into question after their dog runs away; and the police officers Nina and Oliver, whose night on patrol exposes what has remained unfulfilled in their lives.

== Cast ==
The cast includes:

- Denise Virieux as Gloria
- Nils Althaus as Kaspar
- Bruno Cathomas as Pascal
- Lou Haltinner as Karin
- Annina Euling as Zoe
- Katharina von Bock as Christina
- Elisa Plüss as Sabrina
- Joel Basman as Oskar
- Jörg Schneider as Herbert
- Irene Fritschi as Anne-Marie
- Johanna Bantzer as Nina
- Pascal Holzer as Oliver

== Reception ==
=== Awards and nominations ===
The film was nominated for the 2009 Swiss Film Prize for Best Film, Best Screenplay, Best Actor, and Best Film Score.

=== Critical response ===
Filmdienst described the film as an episodic study of unstable relationships and the often strained efforts to make New Year’s Eve feel special. The review also noted its near-documentary style and praised its structure and performances.

== Festival screenings ==
The film premiered in October 2008. It was later screened at festivals including the Hof International Film Festival in 2008, the Solothurn Film Festival, the Festival Rose d'Or, the Moscow International Film Festival, the Locarno Film Festival, and the Kyiv International Film Festival Molodist in 2009, and the Zurich Film Festival in 2016.
