= Gray Matters (2014 film) =

- Theatrical release poster
- Directed by: Marco Orsini
- Written by: Marco Orsini, Frederick L. Greene
- Release dates: October 15, 2014 (Architecture and Design Film Festival); May 28, 2016
- Country: United States
- Language: English

Gray Matters is a 2014 documentary film that was written and directed by Marco Orsini. It premiered at the Architecture and Design Film Festival on 15 October 2014 in New York City and received a theatrical release on 28 May 2016. The film explores the life of architect and designer Eileen Gray.

== Synopsis ==
The documentary focuses on Eileen Gray, who worked in lacquer before launching a career as a designer, decorator, and later an architect. Her work in the field of architecture was largely overlooked until she was re-discovered.

== Reception ==
The Times gave the film four out of five stars, as they felt it was "a fascinating documentary on the great modernist designer and architect Eileen Gray". The Guardian gave Gray Matters three out of five stars, writing that "what makes this even more compelling is the supporting art-historical input from its numerous interviewees (I developed a particular soft spot for the dulcet-voiced Dr Jennifer Goff of the National Museum of Ireland), who collectively explicate Gray’s eclectic style, a playful, practical minimalism that evolved substantially over the years".
