= Zeev Aram =

British furniture and interior designer (1931–2021)

Zeev Aram OBE
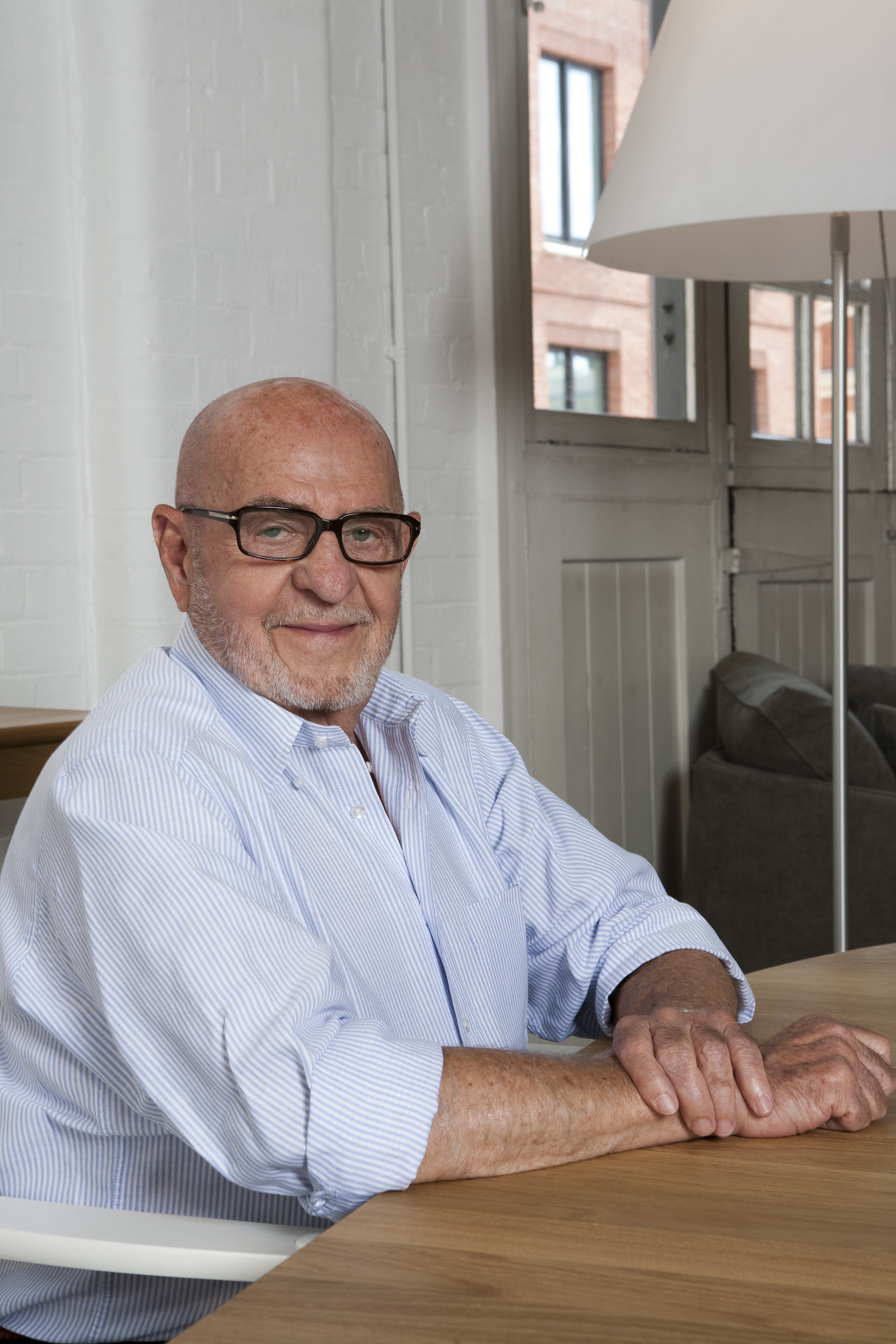
- Zeev Aram in 2011
- Born: 5 October 1931; Cluj, Romania
- Died: 18 March 2021 (aged 89); London, England
- Citizenship: British; Israeli; Romanian
- Education: Central School of Art and Design
- Occupations: Furniture and interior designer
- Known for: Aram Designs; Aram Gallery
- Spouse: Elizabeth Bunzl
- Children: 4
- Website: aram.co.uk

Zeev Aram OBE (5 October 1931 – 18 March 2021) was a British furniture and interior designer. He was the founder and chairman of Aram Designs Ltd, a modern furniture store in London's Covent Garden serving both the retail and contract market. He is responsible for introducing to the London market designers such as Marcel Breuer, the Castiglioni brothers, Mies van der Rohe, and Le Corbusier.

== Early life ==
Zeev Aram was born in Cluj, Romania, the son of Jewish hoteliers, Palma and Aaron Ungar. In 1940 with the outbreak of World War II, the family emigrated to Mandatory Palestine, where Aram grew up.

== Career ==
He initially had a career as an officer in the Israeli Navy but later decided to become an architect. However, the Haifa Polytechnic architecture course had a two-year waiting list, and in 1957 he went to London instead. After completing his course in furniture and interior design the Central School of Art and Design (now Central Saint Martins College of Arts and Design), he joined the architectural office of Ernő Goldfinger. He worked in Goldfinger's practice for a year and then went on to work for Basil Spence and later for Andrew Renton.

Aram established Aram Designs Ltd. at 57 King's Road, Chelsea in 1964 and was the first retailer to bring the work of modernist designers such as Marcel Breuer, Mies van der Rohe, Carlo Scarpa and Le Corbusier to the UK market. In 1973 Aram Designs moved into a larger space at 3 Kean Street, Covent Garden. That same year, Irish architect and furniture designer Eileen Gray granted Aram and Aram Designs Ltd the Worldwide licence to introduce, produce and distribute her designs. Aram worked closely with Gray and played a fundamental role in introducing her designs to the world market. In 2015, Aram acted as consultant and donated furniture to the newly refurbished E-1027, a modernist villa in Roquebrune-Cap-Martin that was designed and built between 1926 and 1929 by Gray.

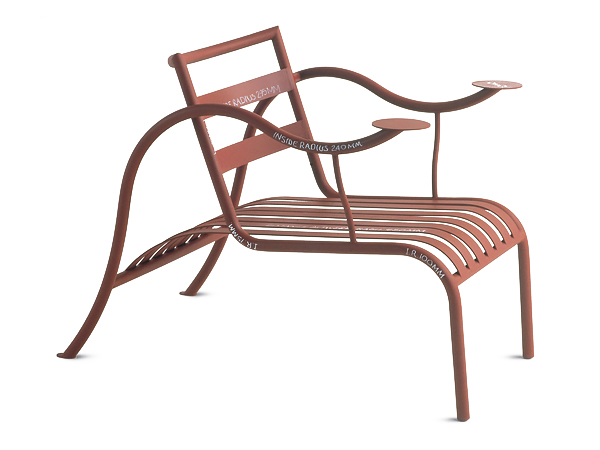
Thinking Man's Chair designed by Jasper Morrison (1987)

Aram was also the director of the Aram Gallery for Experimental and New Design, a non-commercial gallery curating shows focused on experimental design. Through his series of graduate shows he introduced many new designers, such as Thomas Heatherwick and Jasper Morrison, who have gone on to become prolific figures in the design industry.

Amongst Aram's own furniture designs are the Dino Storage System (1964), the Altra Table System (1967) and the Atlantic Desk (1971). In 2014 he was awarded an OBE for services to design and architecture.

== Personal life ==
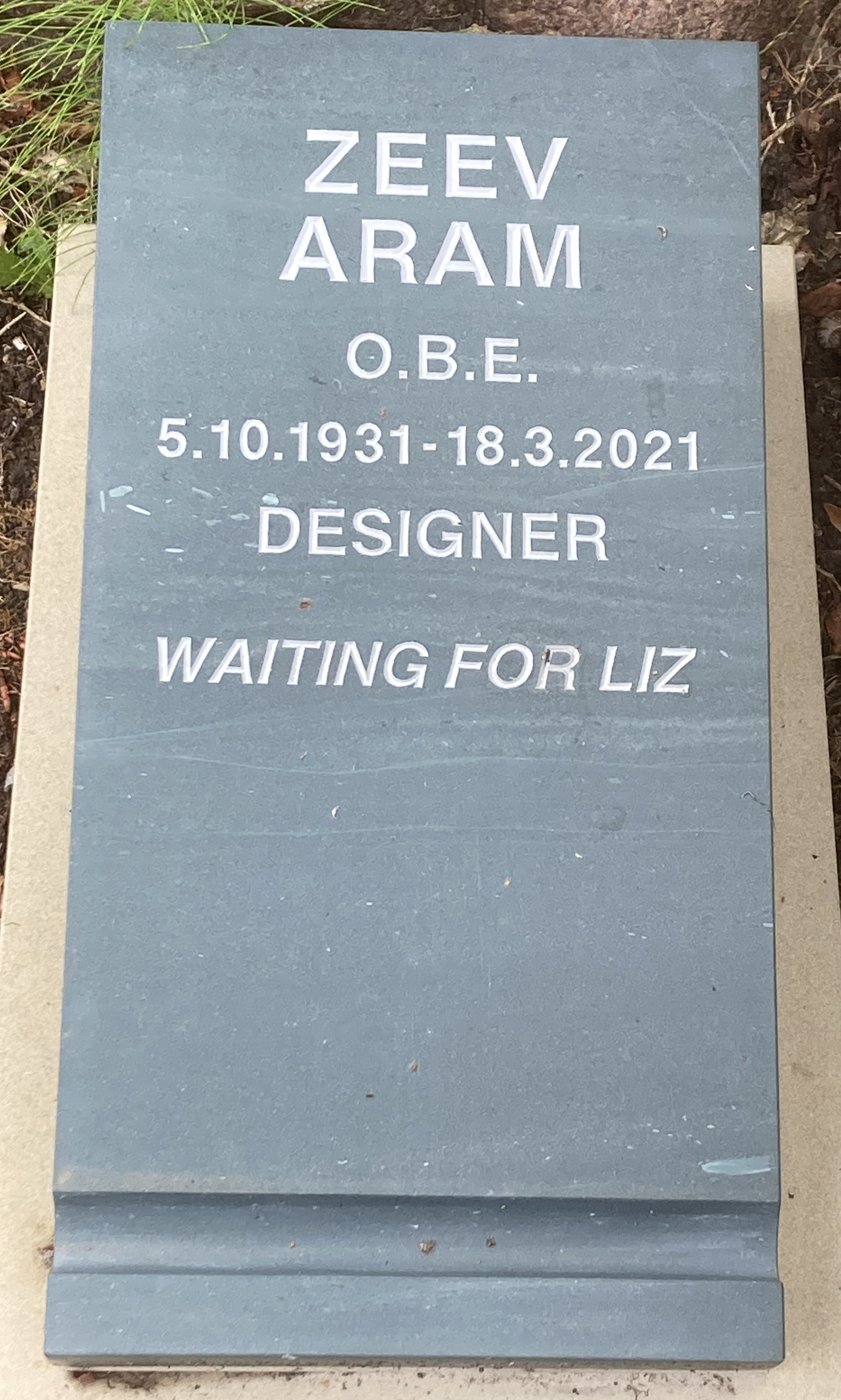
Grave of Zeev Aram in Highgate Cemetery

In 1958, he married Elizabeth Bunzl, the English daughter of Viennese parents. They lived in an Edwardian Dutch house in Wimbledon, and had four children.

He died on 18 March 2021 at the age of 89 and was buried on the eastern side of Highgate Cemetery.
