= "Dragons" armchair =

Chair designed by Irish architect and designer Eileen Gray

The "Dragons" armchair

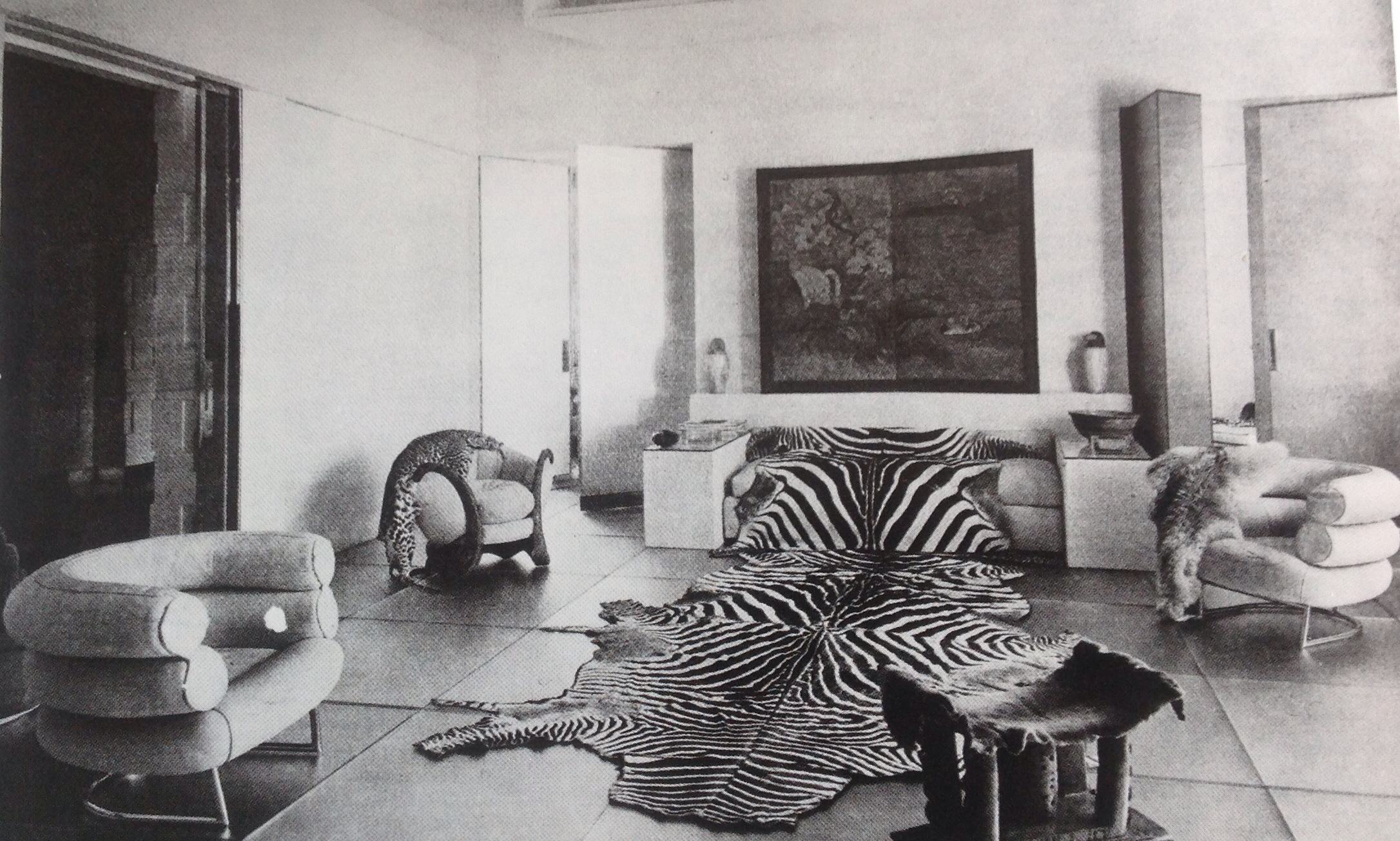
Glass Salon designed by Paul Ruaud with furniture by Eileen Gray, for Madame Mathieu-Levy (Juliette Lévy) milliner of the boutique J. Suzanne Talbot, 9, rue de Lota, Paris, 1922

The "Dragons" armchair (French: "Fauteuil aux Dragons") is a piece of furniture designed by the Irish architect and designer Eileen Gray between 1917 and 1919. The chair sold for €21,905,000 ($31,292,857) in 2009, establishing a new record for a piece of 20th century decorative art.

== Design ==
The chair is a wooden upholstered armchair featuring two stylized lacquered dragons. It measures 61 by 91 cm.

The chair was described by auctioneers Christie's as being:

"In the form of unfurling petals, upholstered in brown leather, the frame in sculpted wood, lacquered brownish orange and silver and modelled as the serpentine, intertwined bodies of two dragons, their eyes in black lacquer on a white ground, their bodies decorated in low relief with stylised clouds."

Christie's additionally felt that the chair "...distills all that was so personal and so magical in the first, intimately expressive phase of Miss Gray's career — surprising, imaginative, subtly sculpted and crafted, it is a masterpiece of invention and execution." Jennifer Goff, the curator of the National Museum of Ireland's permanent exhibition of Gray's work, felt that the chair was the "perfect example of the designer who created it – completely unique [and] rather eccentric".

The dragon imagery and clouds depicted on the chair have been likened to those found in the iconography of traditional Chinese art, and the flowing nature of the ornately carved armrests have been compared to a "sea monster" and given the chair its "Dragons" moniker.

Gray worked on the chair between 1917 and 1919, lacquering the piece by hand and letting the lacquer set in her humid bathroom before spending days polishing the piece.

== History ==
The chair's first owner was Gray's patron, Suzanne Talbot. It was acquired by Parisian art dealer Cheska Vallois in 1971 for $2,700 and then sold by Vallois to the French fashion designer Yves Saint Laurent in 1973. The chair was put up for sale as part of the Yves Saint Laurent and Pierre Bergé collection in February 2009 at Christie's auction house in Paris. It sold for €21,905,000 against a pre-sale estimate of €2-3 million, establishing a new record for a piece of 20th century decorative art. The 2009 buyer of the chair was once again Cheska Vallois who later said that the cost of acquiring it was "the price of desire". The chair was bought by Vallois for an unknown third party erroneously reported to be Henry and Marie-Josée Kravis in March 2009.
