= Christoph Schaub =

Swiss film director

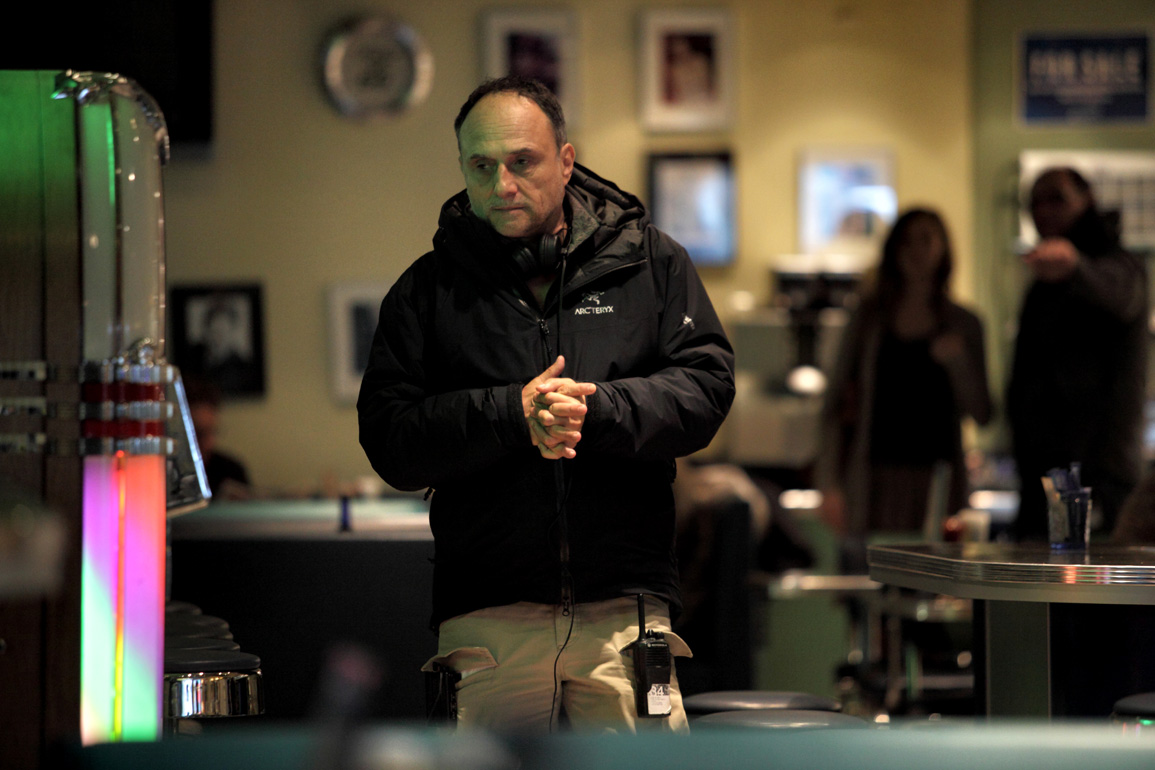
- Schaub in 2011
- Born: 1958 (age 67–68); Zurich, Switzerland
- Occupations: Film director, screenwriter
- Years active: 1987–present

Christoph Schaub (born 1958) is a Swiss film director and screenwriter. He has directed fourteen films since 1987. His 2008 film Happy New Year was entered into the 31st Moscow International Film Festival.

== Selected filmography ==
- Sternenberg (2004)
- Happy New Year (2008)
- Lullaby Ride (2012)
- Amur senza fin (2018)
- E.1027: Eileen Gray and the House by the Sea (2024)
