= E-1027 =

Modernist villa in France designed by Eileen Gray

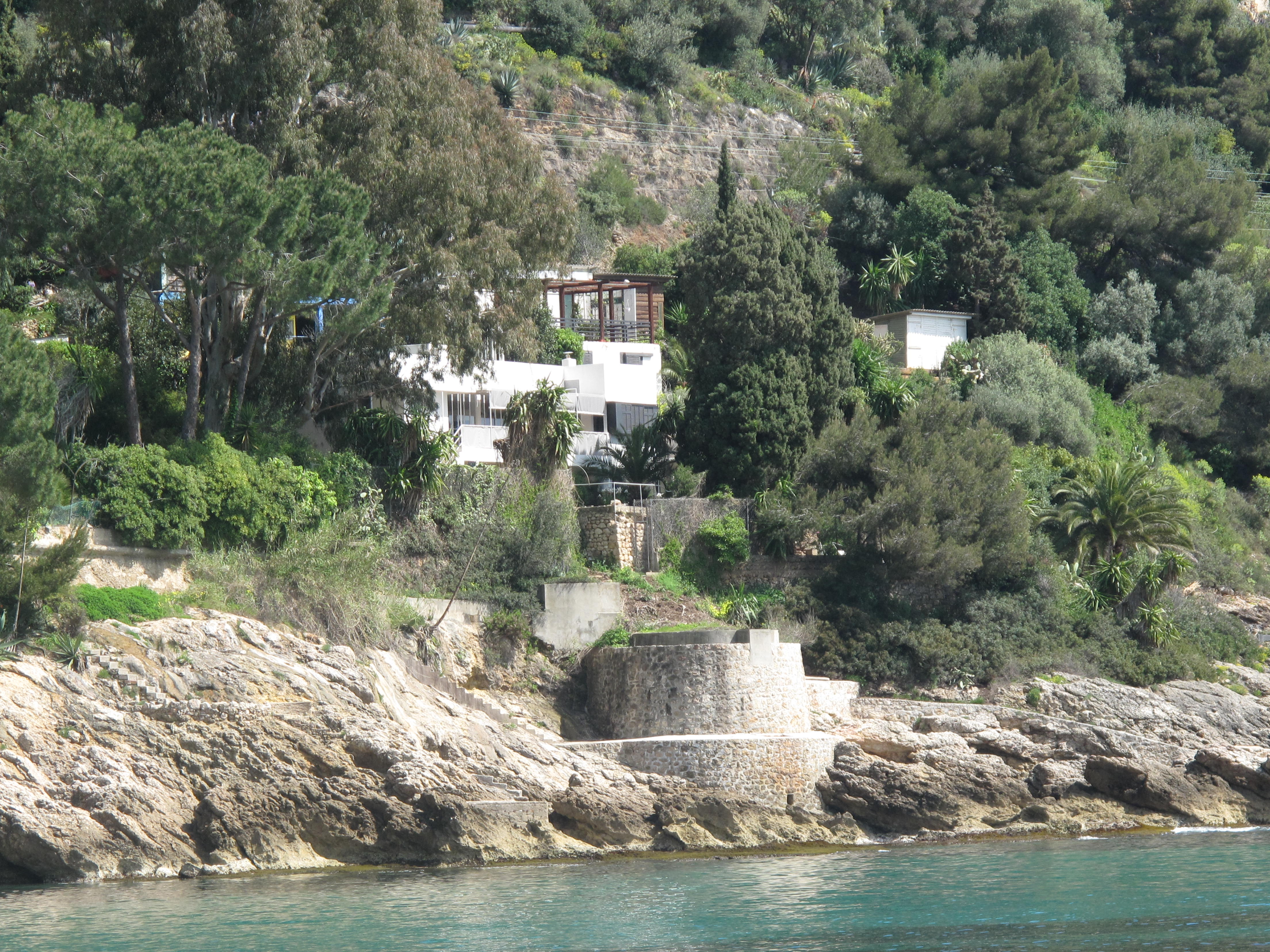
- E-1027 on the shore of Cape Martin.

- Location within France

General information
- Architectural style: Modernism
- Location: Roquebrune-Cap-Martin, France
- Coordinates: 43°45′36″N 7°27′47″E

Design and construction
- Architect: Eileen Gray

E-1027 is a modernist villa in Roquebrune-Cap-Martin, in the Alpes-Maritimes department of France. It was designed and built from 1926–1929 by the Irish architect and furniture designer Eileen Gray and the French/Romanian Architect Jean Badovici. L-shaped and flat-roofed with floor-to-ceiling windows and a spiral stairway to the guest room, E-1027 was both open and compact. This is considered to be Gray's first major work, making indistinct the border between architecture and decoration, and highly personalized to be in accord with the lifestyle of its intended occupants.

The name of the house, E-1027, is a code of Eileen Gray and Jean Badovici ('E' standing for Eileen, '10' Jean, '2' Badovici, '7' Gray), reflecting their relationship as lovers during its construction. It is impossible to identify the exact individual contributions of Gray or Badovici to E-1027. Gray also designed furniture for the house, including a tubular steel table which would enable her sister to eat breakfast in bed without leaving crumbs on sheets, due to an adjustable top that caught the crumbs.

Gray and Badovici separated shortly after the completion of the house and Badovici inherited the house in 1932. In 1938/1939, Le Corbusier painted significant murals in the house, which survive; Gray felt they were an act of vandalism.

== Aftermath ==
Gray began working on a new house, Tempe à Pailla, in nearby Menton in 1931. Tempe à Pailla was furnished by Gray with flexible furniture designed to save space. Only a later house designed by Gray, Lou Pérou in Saint-Tropez, was fully architecturally realized by her.

=== E-1027 and Le Corbusier ===
Badovici inherited the house in 1932 and visited regularly with his wife.

The Swiss born-French Modernist architect, designer, painter, urban planner and writer Le Corbusier was a friend of Badovici and visited the house several times after Badovici and Gray had parted.

While staying as a guest of Badovici in his house in 1938 and 1939, Le Corbusier painted bright murals on its plain white walls with his permission, sometimes in the nude. That change to her ex-lover's house infuriated Gray, who considered the murals outright vandalism. In 2013, the architecture critic Rowan Moore said of the painting of the murals that "As an act of naked phallocracy, Corbusier's actions are hard to top...", adding that Le Corbusier was "seemingly affronted that a woman could create such a fine work of modernism" so he "asserted his dominion, like a urinating dog, over the territory".

Le Corbusier became intricately tied with the future of the house. Failing to purchase it himself, he eventually bought a piece of property just east of E-1027, where he built a small, rustic cabin, his Cabanon de vacances. There he would go for work and quiet contemplation, taking daily swims on the beach outside the house. After, he died in those very waters, the whole area was declared a "Site Moderne," or "Modern Site," and deemed an area of cultural and historical importance and international interest. Today, E-1027 is recognized as the founding element of this site.

== E-1027 today ==
After its lengthy restoration, E-1027 opened to the public in July 2021. Gray's original furniture has been removed from the house, and was sold in the early 1990s at the auction house Sotheby's. Replica furniture was to be supplied for the house by Zeev Aram, a champion of Gray's work. Plans for the renovation were prepared by the French government, who designated it as a French National Cultural Monument. As a result, the state of France and the city of Roquebrune Cap Martin - through the national agency "Conservatoire du littoral" - bought the villa in 1999 and made it secure provisionally. A signboard during the restoration designated the restoration as an initiative of the state of France, the department "Alpes Maritimes" and the city of Roquebrune (expenses to be borne 50% / 10% / 40% respectively).

The house is owned by the Conservatoire du littoral, who have delegated responsibility for it to the local commune of Roquebrune-Cap-Martin. It was the wish of Roquebrune-Cap-Martin that the restoration of E-1027 be managed by the architect Renaud Barres, who had previously produced a study on a possible restoration of the house, and that Barres should work with Burkhardt Rukschcio, an architect who had restored modernist buildings. The French Ministry of Culture wished that the restoration be managed by Pierre-Antoine Gatier, the chief architect for historic monuments in the south of France, who had little experience of modern buildings.

By 2013 the restoration had cost €600,000, and was criticised by Barres and Rukschcio who produced a "dossier which details, with convincing photographic evidence, departures from Gray's intent: thickening of metal rails, original glazing and light switches replaced by standard 21st-century products, a stair clumsily misplaced and mis-dimensioned, a colour scheme different from the 1929 version." In 2016, the Getty Foundation contributed a $200,000 grant to the ongoing restoration work.

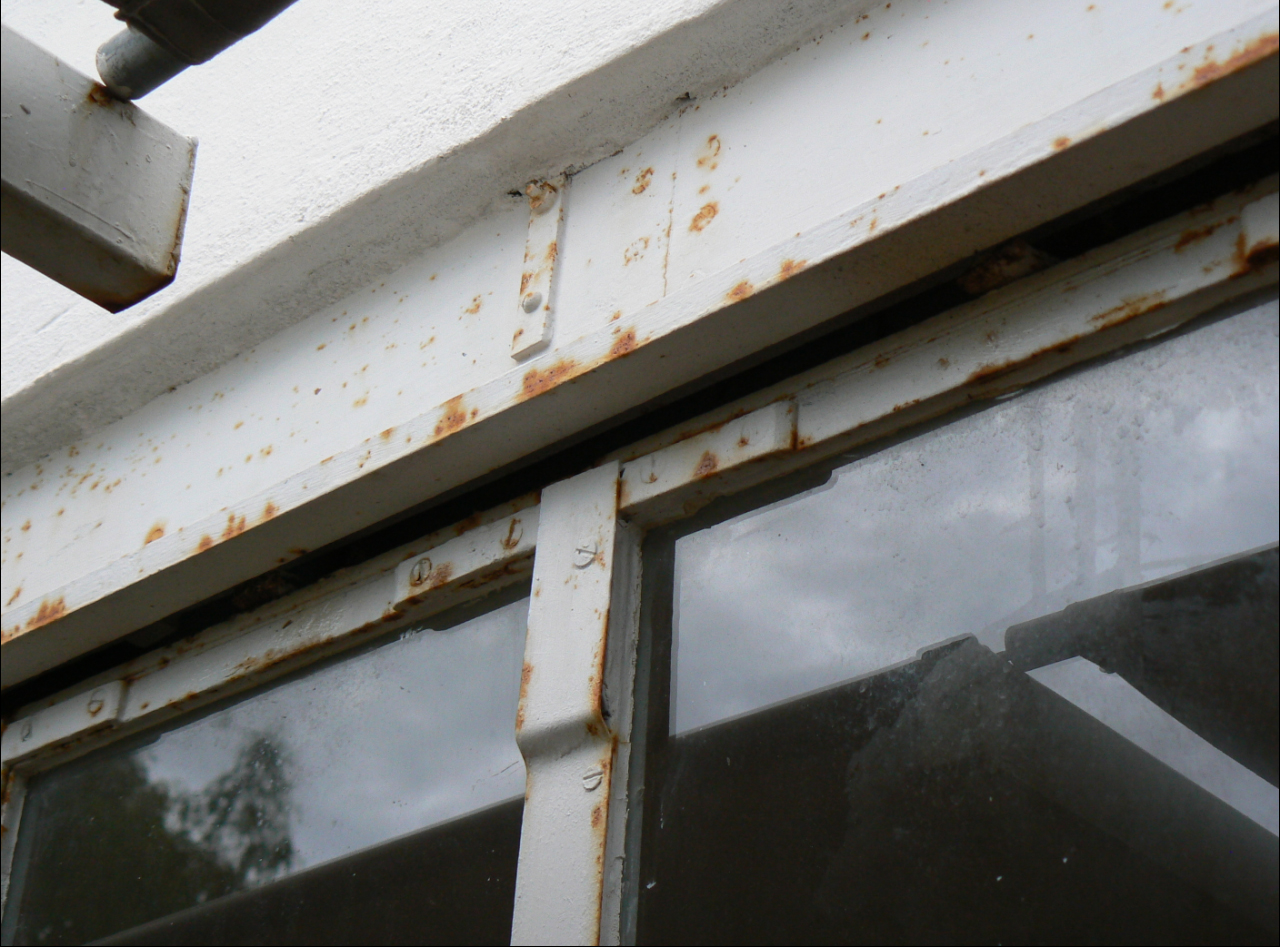
E-1027 after restoration (2013) corrosion of the frames and of the metal work

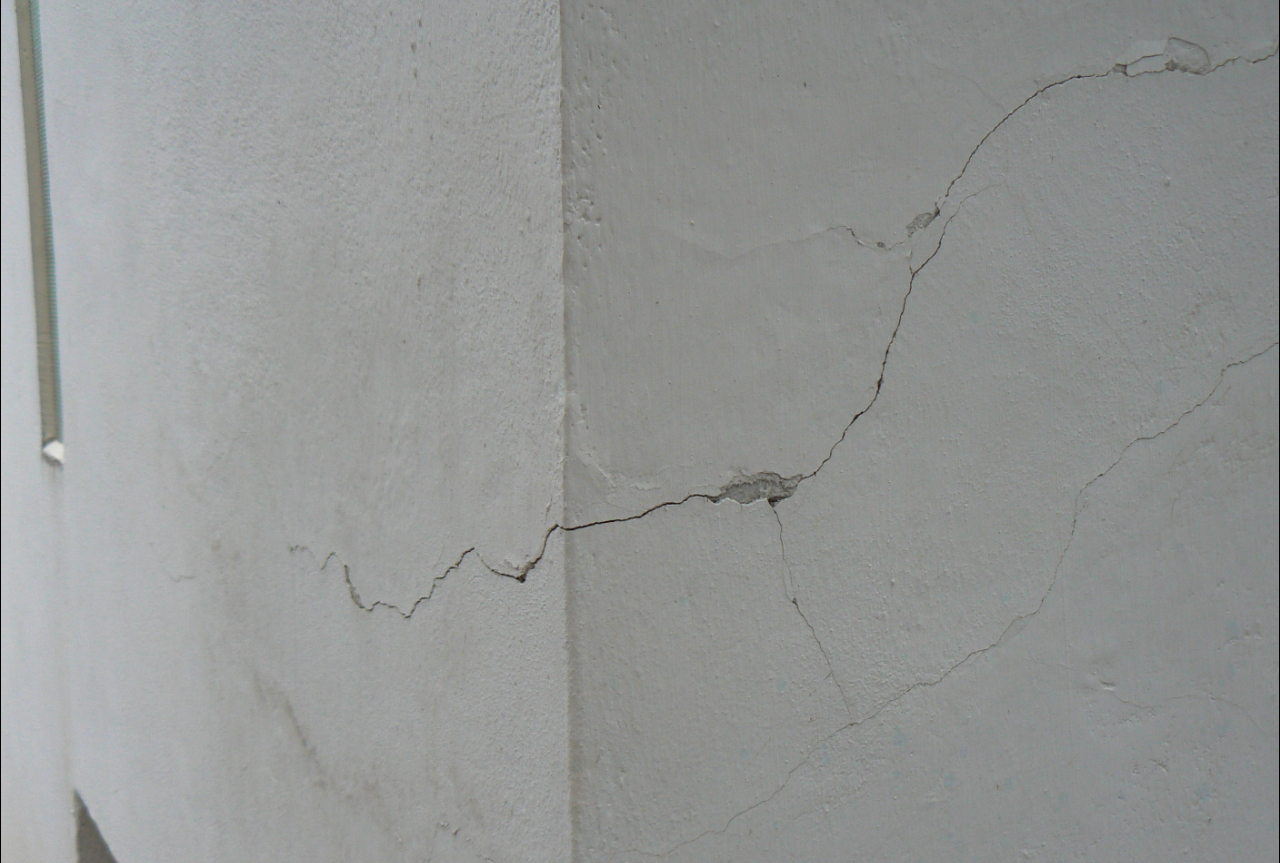
E-1027 after restoration (2013) one example of many cracked walls

Visits are by guided tour only and for groups of no more than 12 persons.

The production of a 2015 biographical film about Gray, The Price of Desire, supported part of the restoration.

== Villa E: A Novel, by Jane Alison ==
In 2024, Australian author Jane Alison released a work of historical fiction called Villa E: A Novel. While the character based on Le Corbusier has a different name, many other details meticulously match the life of Eileen Gray and Le Corbusier, particularly geographically.
