= Jean Badovici =

Romanian architect active in Paris (1893–1956)

- Born: 6 January 1893; Bucharest, Romania
- Died: 17 August 1956 (aged 63)
- Occupations: Architect and architecture critic

Jean Badovici (6 January 1893 – 17 August 1956) was a French architect and architecture critic of Romanian origin, active in Paris, France.

== Biography ==
Born on 6 January 1893 in Bucharest, Romania, Jean Badovici studied architecture in Paris after World War I. From 1923, he edited the important French magazine for avant-garde architecture L'Architecture Vivante. Furthermore, he designed two buildings (residential houses for himself) in Vézelay (1924) and in Paris near Pont de Sèvres (1934). In Roquebrune-Cap-Martin, he assisted Eileen Gray – they were lovers until 1932 – in designing and constructing a home for them, one of the important buildings of the International style, E-1027.

After World War II, Badovici was involved in reconstructing and saving the architectural heritage of France in a board called Bâtiments civils et palais nationaux et des monuments historiques. There, he served as assistant to the chief architect Robert Édouard Camelot (1903–1992).

== L'Architecture Vivante ==
Jean Badovici gained a reputation not for constructing buildings but for analyzing and supporting avant garde architecture. He was an influential critic and mentor of international modern architecture in France from 1923, when he began editing the magazine L'architecture Vivante. He convinced the publisher Albert Morancé of the importance for such an avant garde magazine, which ran from 1923 till 1933. L'Architecture Vivante became immediately an influential mouthpiece of the International style (Bauhaus, Constructivism, De Stijl). Le Corbusier – a friend of Badovici – became one of the architects whose ideals were frequently discussed in this magazine. Badovici cultivated relations to European avant garde magazines such as Wendingen (Netherlands) and Cahiers d'Art (France, founded in 1926) by his friend Christian Zervos.

Regularly, each issue of L'Architecture Vivante featured a number of architects and their works but there were also a few dealing with just one artist, such as Le Corbusier, Pierre Jeanneret and in 1929 Eileen Gray and her home E-1027.

== Personal life ==
Badovici lived with his lover Eileen Gray, who was openly bisexual, in E-1027. Le Corbusier vandalized the wall with his drawing Three Women depicting Eileen and Jean together, even though he was not "granted full authorization". He did not think of it as "an invasion, but as a gift." (From "Battle Lines" by Beatriz Colomina)

== L'Architecture Vivante in libraries ==
In the United States (excerpts):

- New York Public Library (each of the issues from 1923 – 1933 seems to be available)
- Library of Congress (some issues available and complete reprint edition (New York, 1975) available)
- Chicago Public Library (complete reprint edition (New York, 1975) available)
- San Francisco Public Library (complete reprint edition (New York, 1975) available)

In Europe (excerpts):

- Courtauld Institute, London (complete reprint edition (New York, 1975) available)
- Bayerische Staatsbibliothek, München (roundabout 9 issues)
- Bibliothèque nationale de France, Paris (some issues)
- Zentralinstitut für Kunstgeschichte, München (complete edition available)

== Reeditions L'Architecture Vivante ==
The issue concerning Eileen Gray / E.1027:

- Eileen Gray, Jean Badovici: E. 1027: Maison en bord de mer. In L'Architecture Vivante. Reedition Marseille: Éd. Imbernon, 2006, ISBN 2-9516396-5-1.

The complete edition:

- L'Architecture vivante, New York: Da Capo Press, c. 1975
