= Cabanon de vacances =

Building in Roquebrune-Cap-Martin, France

Coordinates: 43°45′36″N 7°27′48″E

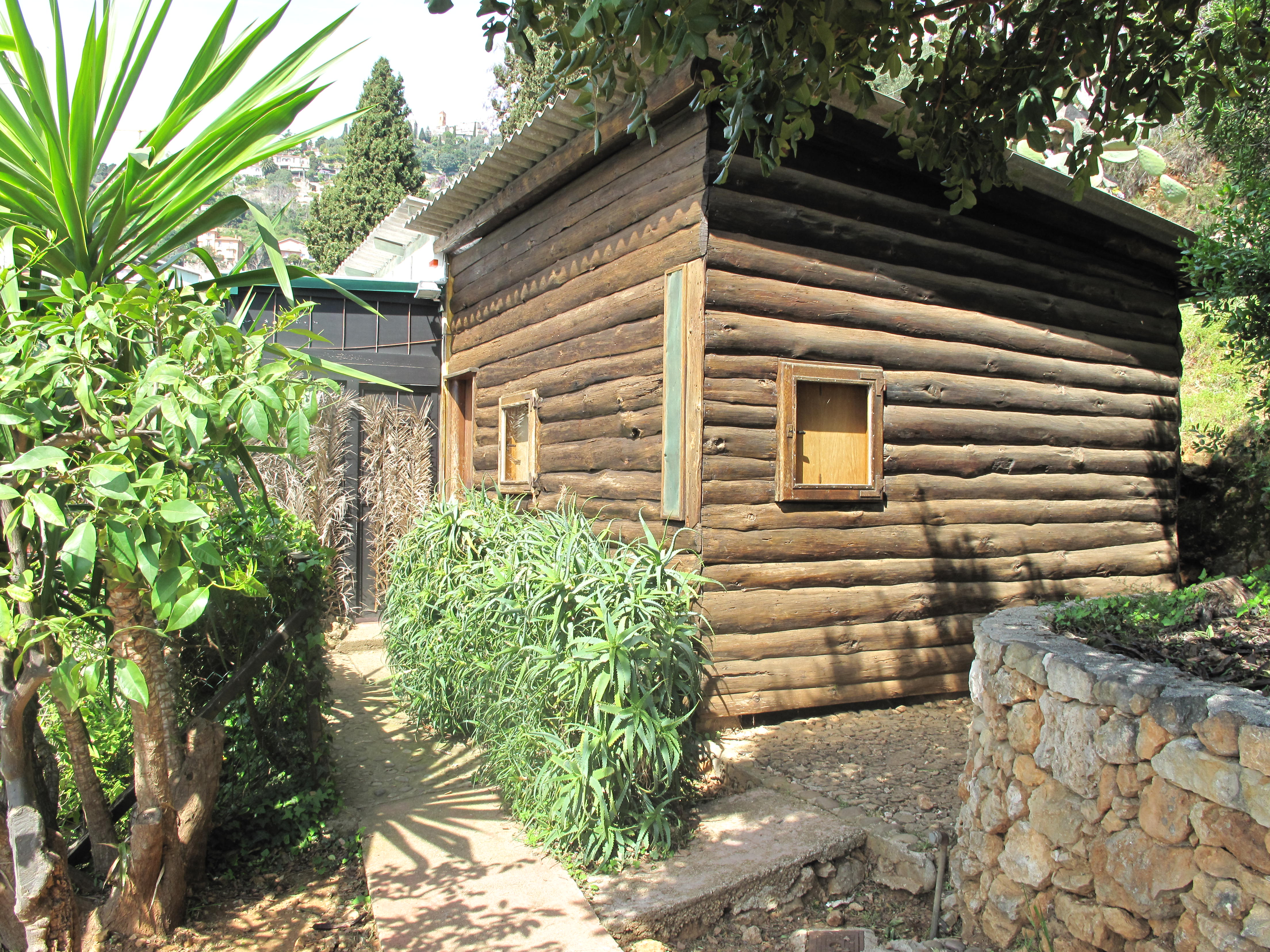

General information
- Location: France, Roquebrune-Cap-Martin
- Completed: 1951

Design and construction
- Architect: Le Corbusier

Website
- https://capmoderne.monuments-nationaux.fr/en/

UNESCO World Heritage Site
- Official name: The Architectural Work of Le Corbusier, an Outstanding Contribution to the Modern Movement
- Type: Cultural
- Criteria: i, ii, vi
- Designated: 2016 (40th session)
- Reference no.: 1321-013

The Cabanon de vacances is a vacation home designed and built by noted architect Le Corbusier in 1951. It is the only place the architect Le Corbusier built for himself which he used for vacation.

It was built exclusively for himself, as a seaside escape away from Parisian city life. Le Corbusier spent every August in the cabin for 14 years. The cabin is constructed out of wood logs. Le Corbusier loved his summer home for its location. Despite spanning just 15 square metres (160 sq ft), the home and sixteen other works by Le Corbusier were inscribed in July 2016 as UNESCO World Heritage Sites, with the cabin ranking as the smallest individual cultural structure on the global list.
