= Eileen Gray =

Irish architect and furniture designer (1878–1976)

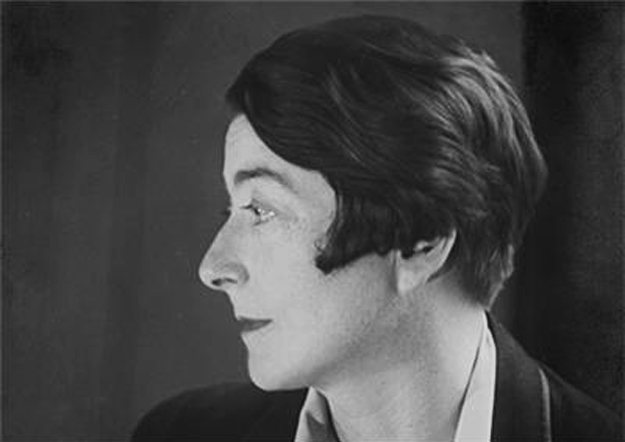
- Eileen Gray
- Born: Kathleen Eileen Moray Smith; 9 August 1878; Enniscorthy, County Wexford, Ireland
- Died: 31 October 1976 (aged 98); Paris, France
- Education: Slade School of Fine Art; Académie Julian; Académie Colarossi
- Occupations: Architect, furniture designer
- Parent(s): James McLaren Smith; Eveleen Pounden
- Buildings: E-1027; Tempe a Païa House
- Design: "Dragons" armchair Bibendum Chair; E-1027 table

Eileen Gray (born Kathleen Eileen Moray Smith; 9 August 1878 – 31 October 1976) was an Irish interior designer, furniture designer and architect who became a pioneer of the Modern Movement in architecture. Over her career, she was associated with many notable European artists of her era, including Kathleen Scott, Adrienne Gorska, Le Corbusier, and the architect Jean Badovici, with whom she was romantically involved and who taught her architecture and collaborated with her on various buildings. Their most famous work is the house known as E-1027 in Roquebrune-Cap-Martin, France.

== Early life ==
Gray was born Kathleen Eileen Moray Smith on 9 August 1878 at Brownswood, an estate near Enniscorthy in County Wexford in the south-east of Ireland. She was the youngest of five children.

Her father, James McLaren Smith, was a Scottish landscape painter. He encouraged Gray's interest in painting and drawing. Although he was a minor figure, James corresponded with major artists of the day.

Her parents’ marriage ended in divorce when she was eleven and her father left Ireland to live and paint in Europe.

Gray's mother, Eveleen Pounden, was a granddaughter of Francis Stuart, 10th Earl of Moray. She became the 19th Baroness Gray in 1895 after the death of her uncle. Although the couple was already separated by this point, Gray's father changed his name to Smith-Gray by royal licence and the four children were from then on known as Gray.

Gray split her upbringing between Brownswood House in Ireland and the family's home at No. 14 The Boltons, in Kensington, London. She was presented as a debutante at Buckingham Palace in 1898.

Both Gray's brother and father died in 1900.

== Education ==
Gray briefly attended a school in Dresden, Germany but was mainly educated by governesses.

Gray's serious art education began in 1900 at the Slade School in London. Gray was a registered fine arts student at the Slade from 1900 to 1902. Although fine arts education was typical for a young woman of Gray's class, Slade was an unusual choice. Known as a bohemian school, the classes at Slade were generally co-educational which was usual for the time. Gray was one of 168 female students in a class of 228.

Gray had many influential teachers at the Slade, including Philip Wilson Steer, a Romantic landscape painter, Henry Tonks, a surgeon and figure painter, and Frederick Brown.

While at the Slade, Gray met furniture restorer Dean Charles in 1901. Charles was Gray's first introduction to lacquering and she took lessons in the technique from his company in Soho. Further on in her career, she created the Brick Screen which used the Japanese Lacquer techniques she learnt at the Slade School of Art

In 1902, Gray moved to Paris with Kathleen Bruce and Jessie Gavin. They enrolled at the Académie Colarossi, an art school popular with foreign students, but soon switched to the Académie Julian.

In 1905, Gray returned to London to be with her ill mother. For the next two years, she studied lacquering with Dean Charles before returning to Paris. When she returned to Paris, Gray purchased a flat in the rue Bonaparte, and began training with Seizo Sugawara. Sugawara trained at Kawaseya, a lacquerware and woodworking manufactory in Sakata, northern Japan. and he was in Paris to restore the lacquer pieces Japan had sent to the Exposition Universale. Gray was so dedicated to learning the trade that she suffered the so-called lacquer disease, a painful rash on her hands, but that did not stop her from working.

In 1910, Gray opened a lacquer workshop with Sugawara. By 1912, she was producing pieces to commission for some of Paris's richest clients.

Gray served as an ambulance driver at the beginning of World War I before returning to England to wait out the war with Sugawara.

== Interior design ==
After the war Gray and Sugawara returned to Paris. In 1917, Gray was hired to redesign the Rue de Lota apartment of society hostess Juliette Lévy. Also known as Madame Mathieu Levy, Juliette owned the fashion house and millinery shop.

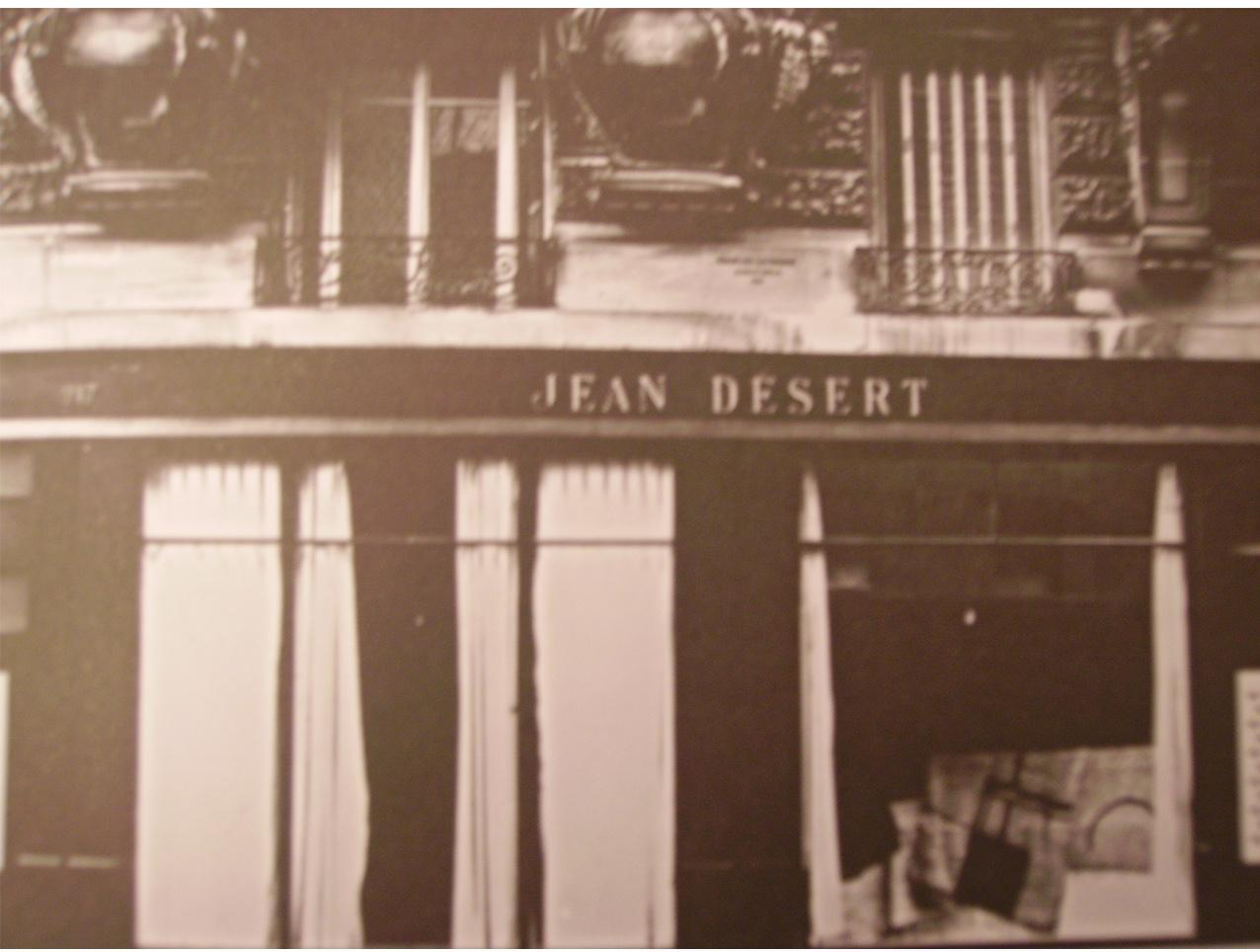
The Jean Desert shopfront was opened by Gray in 1922.

The Rue de Lota apartment has been called "the epitome of Art Deco." A 1920 issue of Harper's Bazaar describes the Rue de Lota apartment as ‘thoroughly modern although there is much feeling for the antique’. The furniture included some of Gray's best known designs – the Bibendum Chair and the Pirogue Day Bed. The Bibendum chair was a take on the Michelin Man with tire like shapes sitting on a chromed steel frame. The chair's shape is reminiscent of the voluptuous figures of women in renaissance paintings, while the geometry calls back to the ideals of Werkbund. The Pirogue Day Bed was gondola-shaped and finished in patinated bronze lacquer, and is inspired by Polynesian dugout canoes. This "boat-bed" may also have been influenced by the Irish currach.

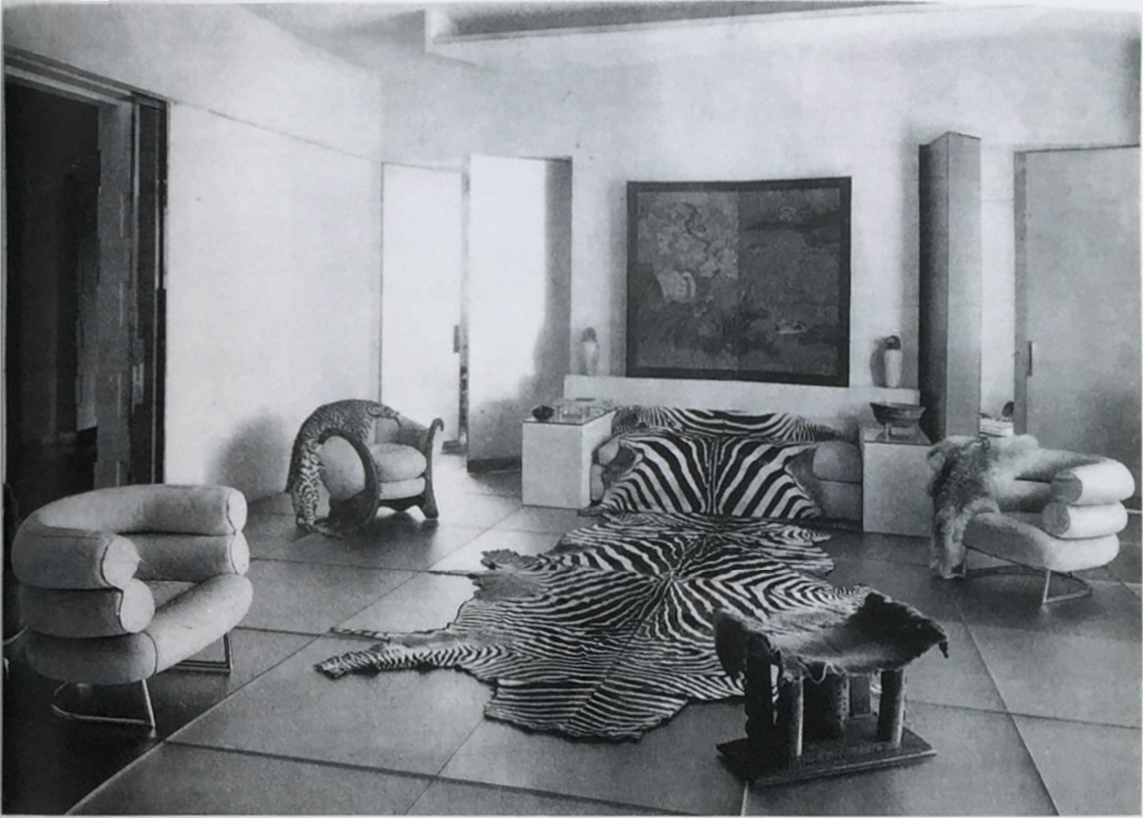
Le salon de verre (Glass Salon) designed by Paul Ruaud with furniture by Eileen Gray, for Madame Mathieu-Levy (Juliette Lévy) milliner of the boutique J. Suzanne Talbot, 9, rue de Lota, Paris, 1922 (published in L'Illustration, 27 May 1933)

The critical and financial success of the project prompted Gray to open her own shop in 1922. Jean Désert was located on the fashionable Rue du Faubourg Saint-Honoré in Paris. The shop was named after an imaginary male owner “Jean” and Gray's love of the North African desert. Gray designed the facade of the shop herself. Jean Désert sold the abstract geometric rugs designed by Gray and woven in Evelyn Wyld's workshops. Clients included James Joyce, Ezra Pound and Elsa Schiaparelli.

Early on Gray used luxurious materials like exotic woods, ivory and furs. In the mid-1920s, her pieces became simpler and more industrial. This reflects her growing interest in the work of Le Corbusier and other Modernists, who valued utility and mathematical principles over ornamentation.

Jean Désert closed due to financial losses in 1930.

== Architecture ==
By 1921, Gray was romantically involved with Romanian architect and writer Jean Badovici who was 15 years her junior. He encouraged her growing interest in architecture. From 1922/1923 to 1926 Gray created an informal architectural apprenticeship for herself as she never received any formal training as an architect. She studied theoretical and technical books, took drafting lessons, and arranged to have Adrienne Gorska take her along to building sites. She also traveled with Badovici to study key buildings and learned by reworking architectural designs.

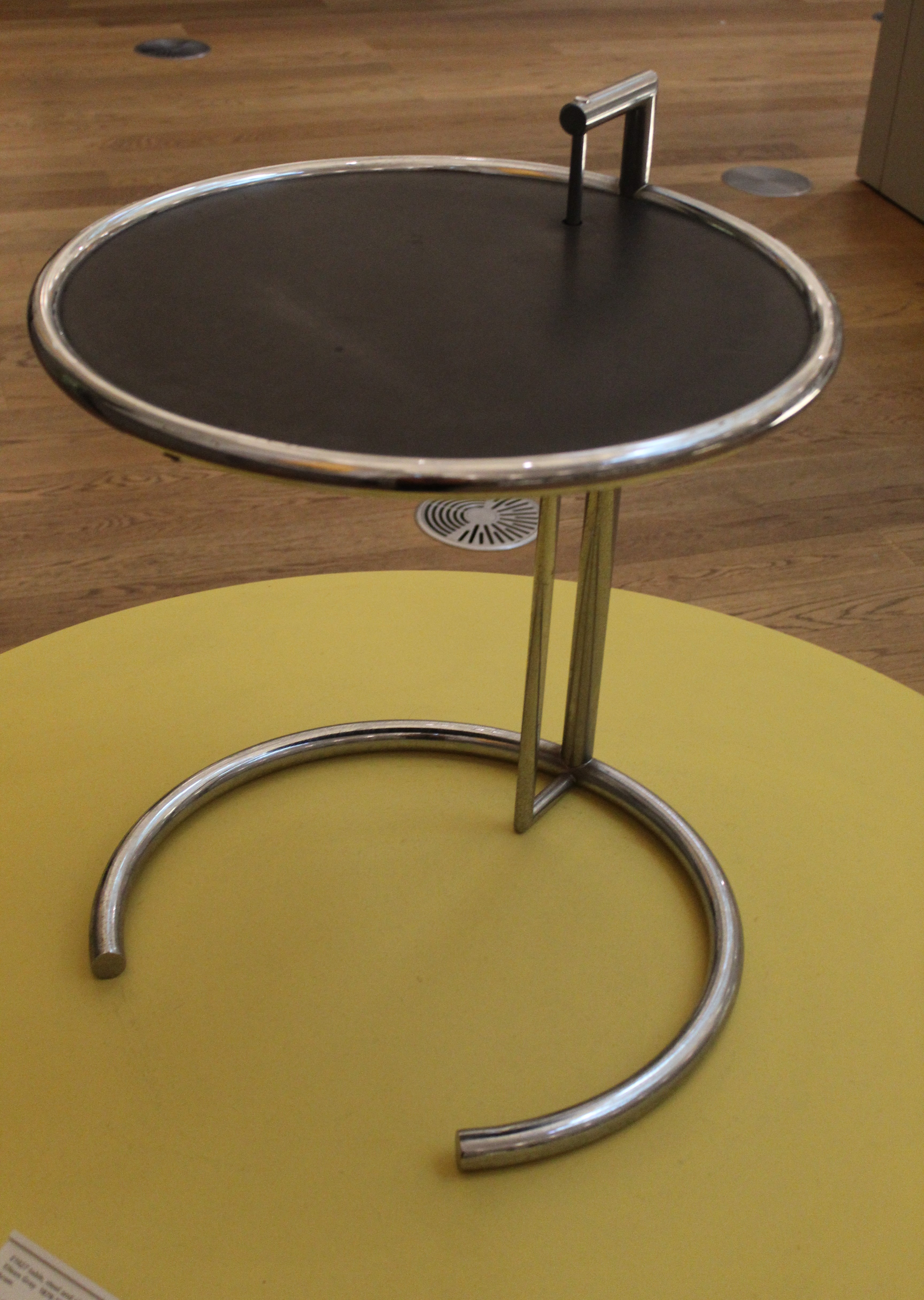
E-1027 table by Eileen Gray, Manchester Art Gallery

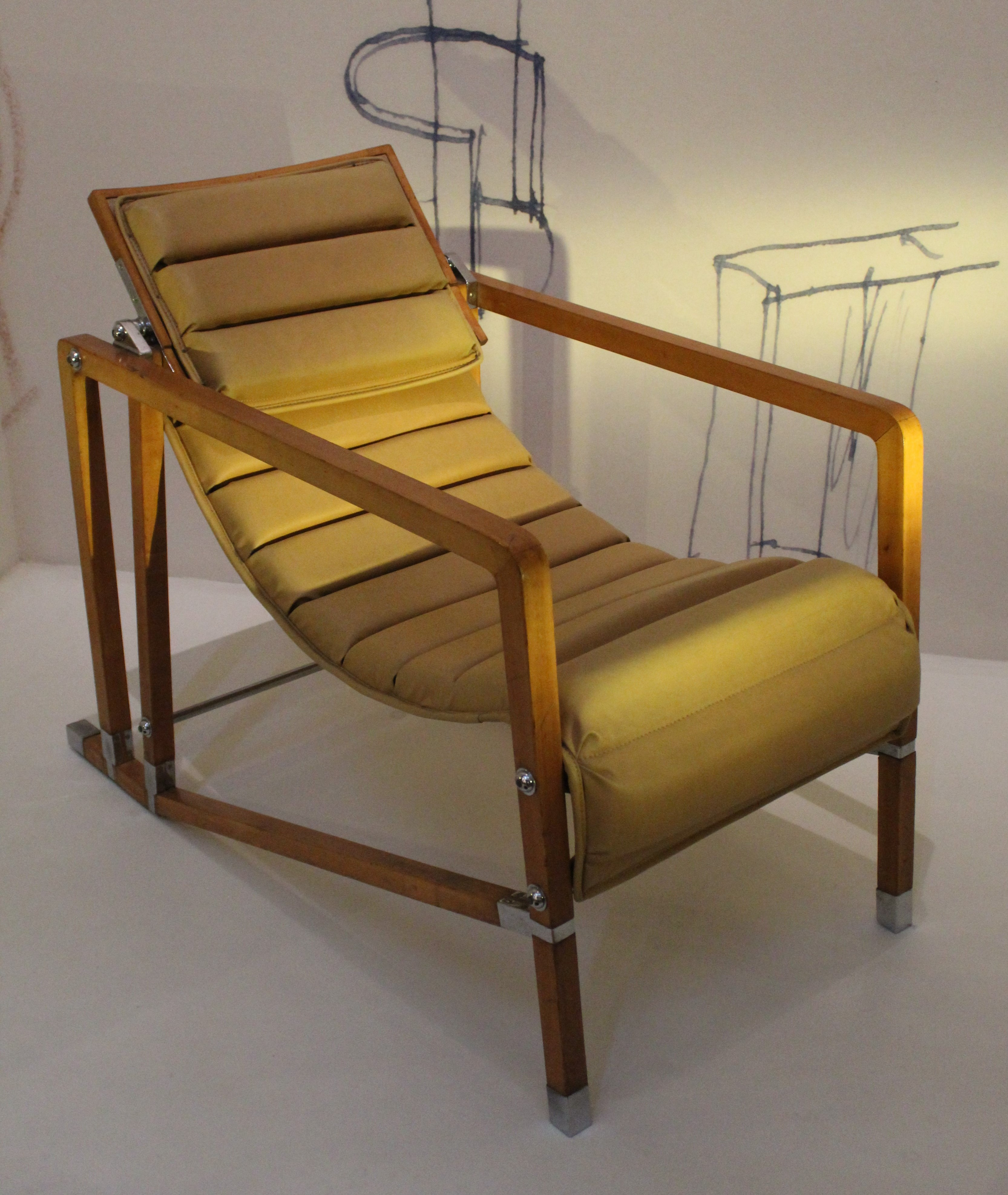
Armchair, 1929, by Gray, Victoria and Albert Museum, London

S Bend chair, 1938, Victoria and Albert Museum, London

In 1926, she started work on a new holiday home near Monaco to share with Badovici. Because a foreigner in France couldn't wholly own property, Gray bought the land and put it in Badovici's name, making him her client on paper. Construction of the house took three years and Gray remained on site while Badovici visited occasionally.

The house was given the enigmatic name of E-1027. It was code for the lovers' names; the E standing for Eileen, the 10 for J, meaning Jean, the 2 for B standing for Badovici and the 7 for G standing for Gray. E-1027 is routinely described as a masterpiece.

E-1027 is a white cuboid built on rocky land on raised on pillars. According to Frances Stonor Saunders, E-1027 was formulated on Le Corbusier's "Five Points of the New Architecture" because it is an open plan house which stands on pillars with horizontal windows, an open facade and a roof accessible by staircase. However, Gray was critical of the avant-garde movement's focus on the exterior of buildings, writing "The interior plan should not be the incidental result of the facade; it should lead to a complete harmonious, and logical life." According to architecture critic Rowan Moore, E-1027 "grows from furniture into a building." By this point, Gray was fascinated by lightweight, functional, multi-purpose furniture which she called "camping style". She created a tea trolley with a cork surface, to reduce the rattling of cups, and positioned mirrors so a visitor could see the back of their head. At the entrance of E-1027 Gray created a celluloid niche for hats with net shelves to allow a clear view without the risk of dust settling.

When E-1027 was finished, Badovici devoted an edition of his magazine to it and announced himself as its joint architect. This claim is disputed by Jennifer Goff, a curator at the National Museum of Ireland. According to Goff's research all extant plans of the house were in Gray's hand alone and “Badovici’s role was firstly client and secondly consultant architect.” In her six-year collaboration with Badovici, Gray was able to create 9 buildings and renovations, 4 of which were credited to Badovici.

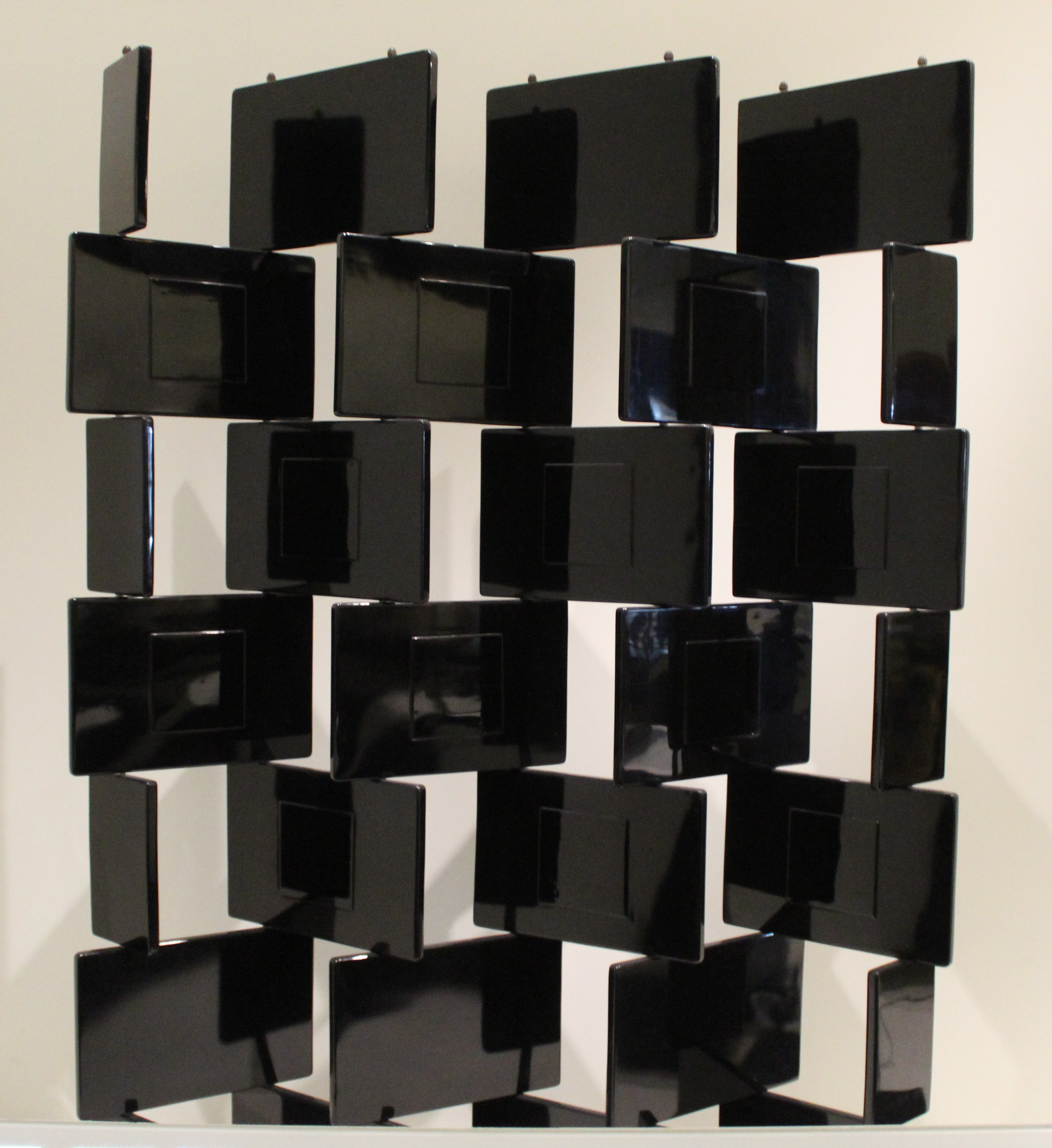
Lacquered folding screen by Gray, Victoria and Albert Museum, London

Gray and Badovici broke up and in 1931 Gray started work on a new house, Tempe à Pailla, above the nearby town of Menton. The name Tempe à Pailla is translated into English as "Time and Hay" and references a Provençal proverb that says both are needed for figs to ripen. It was a small two bedroom house with a large terrace. Much of the furniture was transformable, including expandable wardrobes and a dining banquette that both folded for storage and could be turned into an occasional table. With Tempe à Pailla, Gray moved away from Le Corbusier's free plan ideal and created more separate spaces while maximizing the house's panoramic views. Gray's design also maximized airflow and natural light with features such as shuttered windows and skylights. Gray's multi-level kitchen was influenced by Margarete Schütte-Lihotzky's Frankfurt Kitchen.

Le Corbusier often stayed at E-1027 as a guest of Badovici, who owned it, and in 1938/1939 he painted murals there. Gray had expressed a wish that E-1027 be free of any decoration. His drawing Three Women might depict Eileen and Jean together. Beatriz Colomina, in her seminal article "War On Architecture: E.1027", makes the assertion that, as the archetypical colonist, Le Corbusier didn't think of it as "an invasion, but as a gift [...the type of gift that] can not be returned".

In 2013, The Observer critic Rowan Moore called it an “act of naked phallocracy” by a man asserting “his dominion, like a urinating dog, over the territory”, the nature of this "spasm of comic brutality" being "hotly debated" as "an act of vandalism... infringement of the original architect's intellectual property... a bravura improvement" or "just plain snobbery and sexism". One of the murals, titled Three Women, might be Le Corbusier's response to Gray's use of desire and femininity in her work. The content of the painting (three feminine figures intertwined) could be a reference to Gray's bisexuality.

Other owners of E-1027 included Marie-Louise Schelbert, a friend of Corbusier's, and Heinz Peter Kägi. Architect Renaud Barrés is the current owner.

E-1027 was also the setting for many tragedies. In 1965, Le Corbusier died of a heart attack shortly after swimming at the beach located nearby. In 1996, Heinz Peter Kägi, Marie-Louise Schelbert's gynecologist, was stabbed to death during an altercation with two men in the living room.

== World War I ==
In 1919 the 10th Salon des Artistes Decorateurs featured inexpensive postwar furniture. The goal of the Salon des Artistes was to reconstruct Paris and erase the scars of the war left on the country. In its efforts, multiple artists sought to reestablish that Paris was still the "intellectual capital of the world". During this post-war reconstruction the push for modernization was ever-more evident. This exhibition was made in an attempt to endorse new arts of the French renaissance, stepping up to German designers. Gray participated in the exhibition, however her works were not recorded. In 1920 Harper's Bazaar, an article dedicated to keeping record of Gray's lacquer work stated "Laquer Walls and Furniture Displace Old Gods in Paris and London."

== World War II ==
During World War II, Gray was interned as a foreign national, and her houses were looted. Many of her drawings, models, architectural notes, and personal papers were destroyed by bombing. German soldiers used the walls of E-1027 for target practice.

== Later life ==
Renewed interest in Gray's work began in 1967 when historian Joseph Rykwert published an essay about her in the Italian design magazine Domus. After the publishing of the article many "students began to ring at her door" as eager to learn from the now famous designer.

At a Paris auction of 1972, Yves Saint Laurent bought Le Destin and revived interest in Gray's career.

The first retrospective exhibition of her work, titled Eileen Gray: Pioneer of Design, was held in London in 1972. A Dublin exhibition followed the next year. At the Dublin exhibit, the 95 year-old Gray was given an honorary fellowship by the Royal Institute of the Architects of Ireland.

In 1973 Gray signed a contract to reproduce the Bibendum chair and many of her pieces for the first time, with Aram Designs Ltd, London. They remain in production.

Eileen Gray died on the 31st of October, 1976. She is buried in the Père Lachaise cemetery in Paris, but because her family omitted to pay the licence fee her grave is not identifiable.

== Personal life ==
Gray may have been bisexual. She was involved with contemporary lesbian circles, associating with Romaine Brooks, Loie Fuller, Marie-Louise Damien (a singer with the stage name Damia), and Natalie Barney.

Gray was in an intermittent relationship with Marie-Louise Damien. Their relationship ended in 1938, after which they never saw each other again, despite both simultaneously living in Paris into their nineties.

Gray was also in a relationship with Jean Badovici, the Romanian architect and writer, for some time. He had written about her design work in 1924 and encouraged her interest in architecture. Their romantic involvement ended in 1932.

Having never lived in Ireland during her adult life, in her old age she reportedly stated, "I am without roots, but if I have any, they are in Ireland".

== Posthumous ==
Gray's achievements were restricted during her lifetime. According to Reyner Banham, "[Eileen Gray's work] was, also, in its day, part of a personal style and philosophy of design which was, by the look of things, too rich for the punditry to take. And if the punditry didn't publish you, particularly in the great canon-defining compendia of the thirties, forties and fifties you dropped off the record, and ceased to be a part of the universe of scholarly discourse."

The National Museum of Ireland has a permanent exhibition of her work in the Collins Barracks site.

In February 2009, Gray's "Dragons" armchair made by her between 1917 and 1919 (acquired by her early patron Suzanne Talbot and later part of the Yves Saint Laurent and Pierre Bergé collection) was sold at auction in Paris for €21.9 million (US$28.3 million), setting an auction record for 20th-century decorative art.

Marco Orsini's documentary, Gray Matters, was released in 2014. A biopic on Gray's life by Mary McGuckian, The Price of Desire opened in 2016. A 2020 short film by Michel Pitiot, In Conversation with Eileen Gray, was based on an unreleased 1973 interview with Andrew Hodgkinson. In 2024 a Swiss documentary by Beatrice Minger and Christoph Schaub with the title Eileen Gray and the House by the Sea was screened at the Zurich Film Festival.

== Exhibition history ==
- "Eileen Gray", Bard Graduate Center Gallery, New York City, 29 February – 12 July 2020.
- "Eileen Gray", Centre Pompidou, Paris, 20 February – 20 May 2013.
- "Eileen Gray", The Museum of Modern Art, New York, 6 February – 1 April 1980.
